= List of doping cases in cycling =

The following is an incomplete list of doping cases and recurring accusations of doping in professional cycling, where doping means "use of physiological substances or abnormal method to obtain an artificial increase of performance." It is neither a list of shame nor a list of illegality, as the first laws were not passed until 1965 and their implementation is an ongoing developing process. Thus the list contains doping incidents, those who have tested positive for illegal performance-enhancing drugs, prohibited recreational drugs or have been suspended by a sports governing body for failure to submit to mandatory drug testing. It also contains and clarifies cases where subsequent evidence and explanation has shown the parties to be innocent of illegal practice.

In 1963, the Council of Europe gave the following definition of doping:

"Doping is the administration to a normal subject in any possible way of a foreign agent or abnormal quantities of physiological substances with the sole purpose of increasing artificially and in an unfair manner the performance of the subject participating in a contest."

The International Olympic Committee slightly modified this, and adopted this definition:

"The administration of or use by a competing athlete of any substance foreign to the body or any physiologic substance taken in abnormal quantity or taken by an abnormal route of entry into the body with the sole intention of increasing in an artificial and unfair manner his/her performance in competition. When necessity demands medical treatment with any substance which, because of its nature, dosage, or application is able to boost the athlete's performance in competition in an artificial and unfair manner, this too is regarded as doping."

== 1880s ==
=== 1886 ===
In 1886, a Welsh cyclist is popularly reputed to have died after drinking a blend of cocaine, caffeine and strychnine, supposedly in the Bordeaux–Paris race. This was included in the 1997 International Olympic Committee study on the Historical Evolution of Doping Phenomenon, and listed as the presumed first death due to doping during a competition. The report did allow that in this period it was common practice, and not illegal. This is alternatively reported as 'trimethyl" poisoning (a compound which does not actually exist). However, the main Bordeaux–Paris race did not start until 1891, and the cyclist who supposedly died in 1886, Arthur Linton, actually finished second in 1896 and died a few weeks later, reportedly from a combination of drug-induced exhaustion and typhoid fever. Linton was managed by the notorious Choppy Warburton - see 1896 below. The story may be apocryphal.

== 1890s ==
=== 1896 ===
- Arthur Linton from Aberdare in Wales died aged 24 of 'exhaustion and typhoid fever' a few weeks after finishing second in the Bordeaux–Paris race and a race at Catford. Linton was managed by the notorious Choppy Warburton, whose success was questioned, with claims that he drugged his charges. Jimmy Michael is said to have accused Warburton of poisoning him, before he was taken to court for libel. Rudiger Rabenstein claims that Arthur Linton was "massively doped" for the 1896 Bordeaux–Paris. The British and French cycling union announced that Michael would be banned, even though there was no rule at that time against doping. In the end, Michael was not banned, but he left to ride in the United States.

Nitroglycerine was used to stimulate the heart after cardiac attacks and was credited with improving riders' breathing. Riders suffered hallucinations from the exhaustion and perhaps the drugs. The American champion Major Taylor refused to continue a New York race, saying: "I cannot go on with safety, for there is a man chasing me around the ring with a knife in his hand."

=== 1897 ===
- Choppy Warburton of Haslingden, England died aged 52. He was described by the Lancashire Family History Society:
  "Choppy has been firmly identified as the instigator of drug-taking in the sport [cycling] in the 19th century."

Warburton was banned from the sport after unproven claims of massive doping in the 1896 Bordeaux–Paris. His activities may have contributed to the early deaths of Arthur Linton, Tom Linton and Jimmy Michael.

== 1900s ==
=== 1904 ===
- Jimmy Michael of Wales, world cycling champion, died aged 27, en voyage to New York City. The cause of death was noted as delirium tremens, probably brought on by drinking. Michael was managed by Choppy Warburton. Michael was reported to have taken a potion and within a few laps collapsed on the track, picked himself up and then in a daze, set off in the wrong direction. Michael is said to have accused Warburton of "poisoning him", before he was taken to court for libel.

== 1910s ==
=== 1911 ===
- Paul Duboc of France was doped or poisoned during the Tour de France. He was favourite but collapsed in a ditch in the Pyrenees after drinking from a spiked or poisoned bottle, allegedly given by a rival team manager. He finished in second place.

== 1920s ==
=== 1924 ===
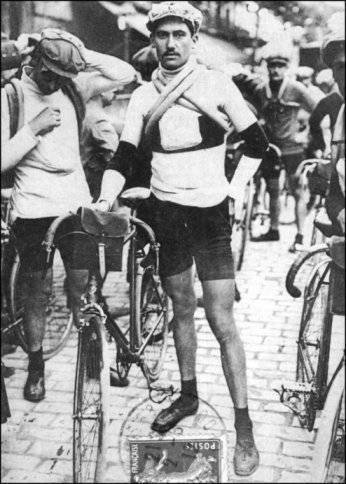
Henri Pelissier, 1919

- Henri Pélissier, Francis Pélissier, and Charles Pélissier of France – In 1924, following their abandoning of the Tour de France, the first real drug scandal arose when the Pélissier brothers gave an extraordinary interview to journalist Albert Londres. They said that they used strychnine, cocaine, chloroform, aspirin, "horse ointment" and other drugs to keep going. The story was published in Le Petit Parisien under the title "Les Forçats de la Route" ('The Convicts of the Road'). Francis is reported as saying "In short, we run on dynamite." Henri is reported as saying "Do you know how we keep going? Look, this is cocaine, chloroform, too. And pills? You want to see pills? Here are three boxes - We run on dynamite." Francis Pélissier said much later: "Londres was a famous reporter but he didn't know about cycling. We kidded him a bit with our cocaine and our pills." Even so, the Tour de France in 1924 was no picnic. See Doping at the Tour de France - The Convicts of the Road.

== 1930s ==
=== 1930 ===
The acceptance of drug-taking in the Tour de France was so complete by 1930 that the rule book, distributed by Henri Desgrange, reminded riders that drugs would not be provided by the organisers.

== 1940s ==
=== 1949 ===
- Fausto Coppi of Italy admitted in a television interview in 1952 that he used 'la Bomba' as there was no alternative if you wanted to remain competitive. This referred to amphetamines, which had been developed for military use during World War II to keep aircrew, merchant seamen and submariners awake, alert and energetic. After the war they found a ready market among endurance sportsmen. Coppi also said, "One day I will take the wrong pill and pedal backward." He also joked on camera that he only took drugs when absolutely necessary, which is nearly always.

== 1950s ==
=== 1955 ===
- Jean Malléjac of France collapsed on Mont Ventoux during the 1955 Tour de France; it was widely attributed to drug abuse. Ten kilometres from the summit he was: "Streaming with sweat, haggard and comatose, he was zigzagging and the road wasn't wide enough for him... He was already no longer in the real world, still less in the world of cyclists and the Tour de France." Malléjac collapsed, falling to the ground with one foot still trapped in a pedal. The other leg pedalled on in the air. He was "completely unconscious, his face the colour of a corpse, a freezing sweat ran on his forehead. He regained consciousness after 15 minutes attention, oxygen, water, and an injection of solucamphre (a decongestant). In the ambulance he insisted that he had been drugged against his will and that he wanted to start legal proceedings. He denied wrongdoing right up to his death in September 2000.

=== 1956 ===
- Following the 14th Stage of the 1956 Tour de France, the entire Belgian team went down with a mystery illness. It was officially attributed to their having eaten 'bad fish' at dinner, an excuse also used in 1962 and 1991.

=== 1958 ===
- Roger Rivière of France admitted, after his career was finished, to having taken "amphetamines and solucamphre" during his hour record of 1958—including taking tablets during the attempt.

=== 1959 ===
- Charly Gaul from Luxembourg was implicated in July when French customs confiscated pills that were destined for him.

== 1960s ==
=== 1960 ===
- Knud Enemark Jensen of Denmark participated in the 1960 Summer Olympic Games in Rome riding under the influence of amphetamines; he collapsed during the 100 km team time trial during the Games, fracturing his skull, and in a nearby Rome hospital shortly thereafter, he was pronounced dead. The autopsy showed he had taken amphetamine and another drug, Ronicol (Ronicol Retard) (nicotinyl alcohol tartrate), a direct-acting peripheral vasodilator that causes flushing and may decrease blood pressure. (He was also reported as swallowing 8 pills of phenylisopropylamine, 15 pills of amphetamine and coffee.) The chairman of the Dutch cycling federation, Piet van Dijk, said of Rome that "dope - whole cartloads -[were] used in such royal quantities." Jensen's death led to pressure on the International Olympic Committee, which studied a report on doping drawn up by doctors demanding dope controls.
- Gastone Nencini of Italy was discovered by Tour de France doctor Pierre Dumas in his bedroom with plastic tubes running from each arm to a bottle of hormones; retransfusion was a legal practice at the time. In the 1930s, Scandinavian runners were believed to have used retransfusion to increase the number of corpuscles that carry oxygen to the muscles. In 1972, Dr Björn Ekblom of the Sport and Gymnastics Institute in Stockholm found that retransfusing cells increased oxygen uptake by nine per cent and athletic potential by 23 per cent.
- Roger Rivière of France admitted that his career-ending crash in the 1960 Tour de France was probably attributable to using Palfium (Dextromoramide), a painkiller that affects reflexes and judgment, during the descent of the Col de Perjuret on Mont Aigoual. Palfium was used to deaden pain in leg muscles where it was directly injected (sometimes while riding). It was suggested that it had so numbed Rivière's fingers that he could not feel the brake levers. He said he had an injection of solucamphor and amphetamine before the start and swallowed several amphetamine tablets. He said he was an addict who downed thousands of pills a year.

=== 1962 ===
The Wiel's-Groene Leeuw affair – At the stage from Luchon to Carcassonne of the 1962 Tour de France, twelve riders fell ill and said 'bad fish' was the cause. Tour doctor Pierre Dumas realized they had all been given the same drug by the same soigneur. Hans Junkermann of Germany had been ill overnight so the start was delayed by 10 minutes, but at the first hill he got off his bike and sat by the roadside, telling onlookers "I ate bad fish at the hotel last night." Eleven other riders abandoned the Tour that day, including the former leader, Willy Schroeders, the 1960 winner Gastone Nencini and a future leader, Karl-Heinz Kunde. Jacques Goddet wrote that he suspected doping but nothing was proven - other than that none of the hotels had served fish the previous night.

=== 1964 ===
France passed its first anti-doping law in November 1964.

=== 1965 ===
- Jacques Anquetil of France never hid that he took drugs – a common practice at the time - and in a debate with a government minister on French television said that only a fool would imagine it was possible to ride Bordeaux–Paris on just water. He and other cyclists had to ride through "the cold, through heat waves, in the rain and in the mountains", and they had the right to treat themselves as they wished, he said in a television interview, before adding: "Leave me in peace; everybody takes dope." There was implied acceptance of doping right to the top of the state: the president, Charles de Gaulle, said of Anquetil: "Doping? What doping? Did he or did he not make them play the Marseillaise [the French national anthem] abroad?" The veteran reporter Pierre Chany said: "Jacques had the strength - for which he was always criticised - to say out loud what others would only whisper. So, when I asked him 'What have you taken?' he didn't drop his eyes before replying. He had the strength of conviction."
- French amateurs André Bayssière and Charly Grosskost collapsed in the Tour de l'Avenir in July. They were banned when they confessed to using amphetamines.
- Peter Post of the Netherlands acknowledged that he had doped at the Tour de France.
- Luis Santamarina of Spain was disqualified from the Milk Race in Great Britain, as one of four competitors who were caught in the first official blood tests. (See below - Performance-enhancing drugs became illegal) Having won a stage which started at Scarborough and crossed Rosedale Chimney, riding ahead of the race on one of the race's hardest climbs, he rode into the back of a car parked beside the road as an official waited to time him. He remounted and won the stage and led the race. Two days later, he and three others (Canet and Usamentiaga of Spain and Ken Hill of Great Britain) were disqualified for doping. The Spanish team went home.

Performance-enhancing drugs became illegal on 1 June 1965. The first riders to be caught were four amateurs, three Spanish (Luis Santamarina, Canet and Usamentiaga) and one Briton (Ken Hill), who were thrown out of the Milk Race when they tested positive for amphetamines after Professor Arnold Beckett first applied sensitive gas chromatographic techniques to monitor drug abuse.

=== 1966 ===
On 29 July testing began at the Tour de France. Raymond Poulidor was the first rider to be tested in the Tour at the end of a stage to Bordeaux. He said "I was strolling down the corridor in ordinary clothes when I came across two guys who asked if I was a rider. They made me go into a room, I pissed into some bottles and they closed them without sealing them. Then they took my name, my date of birth, without asking for anything to check my identity. I could have been anyone, and they could have done anything they liked with the bottles." The next morning, on the way to the Pyrenees, the riders climbed off, began walking and shouting protests.

=== 1967 ===
- Tom Simpson of Great Britain died of exhaustion on the slopes of Mont Ventoux during the 13th stage of the 1967 Tour de France. The post mortem found that he had taken amphetamines and alcohol, a diuretic combination which proved fatal when combined with the hot conditions, the notoriously hard climb of the Ventoux and a pre-existing stomach complaint. Investigators discovered more drugs in his hotel room at Sète and the pockets of his jersey.
- Evert Dolman of the Netherlands was stripped of his 1967 Dutch National Road Race Championship title because of doping.

=== 1968 ===
- Felice Gimondi of Italy tested positive at the Giro D'Italia.

=== 1969 ===
- Eddy Merckx of Belgium tested positive for the stimulant Reactivan at Savona during the 1969 Giro d'Italia, after leading the race through 16 stages. Merckx was found positive at doping control and expelled from the Giro. Merckx steadfastly denied the charges. The controversy began to swirl when his test results were not handled in the ordinary manner. The positive doping control was released to the press before all parties (Merckx and team officials) involved were notified and happened just after Merckx refused to accept money for not competing in general classification.
- Joaquim Agostinho of Portugal tested positive in the Tour of Portugal. He subsequently tested positive again in 1973, and the Tour de France of 1977.

== 1970s ==
=== 1972 ===
- Jaime Huélamo of Spain finished third in the 1972 Summer Olympics men's individual road race but was later disqualified after he tested positive for coramine.
- Aad van den Hoek of the Netherlands tested positive for Coramine at the Munich Olympics, a drug allowed by the International Cyclists' Union but not the IOC.

=== 1973 ===
- Eddy Merckx tested positive for a banned substance in the Giro di Lombardia classic. He was disqualified from first place. Runner-up Felice Gimondi was declared the winner.

=== 1974 ===
In 1974, an advance in testing caught 13 prominent riders including Herman Van Springel.

- Roger Legeay of France tested positive for amphetamines at the Paris–Nice race.
- Claude Tollet of France tested positive for amphetamines at the Tour de France.

=== 1975 ===
- Bernard Thévenet of France won the 1975 Tour de France by using cortisone. In 1982, after retiring from racing, he said "I was doped with cortisone for three years and there were many like me. [...] The experience ruined my health".
- Erik De Vlaeminck of Belgium never failed a drugs test in his racing career, but he was treated after it for amphetamine addiction at a psychiatric institute. Many stories circulate about his reported wild behaviour after races and when he put his career on hold. When he returned to racing, the Belgian federation would offer him a licence for only a day at a time until it saw how his life would progress. He refused to speak of this period of his life.

=== 1976 ===
- Rachel Dard of France was reported to have raced across France to avoid a positive dope finding and then ended up in a row which exposed organised drug-taking in cycling in the 1970s. Dard and a teammate, Bourreau, were caught trying to defraud the doping control with a condom of untainted urine in their shorts to give the impression they were urinating. A few weeks later Dard went to L'Équipe and spilled the inside story, including the prescriptions for dope that Bellocq, the team doctor, had given him. He said riders treated with cortisone and steroids were now in "a pitiful state".
- In the 1976 Vuelta a España, Belgian cyclist Eric Jacques took over the lead in the eighth stage, but it was later revealed that he failed a doping test, and he was penalized by having ten minutes added to his total competition time.

=== 1977 ===
- Bernard Thévenet of France won the 1977 Tour de France with the aid of cortisone.
- Joop Zoetemelk of the Netherlands tested positive for Pemoline in the 1977 Tour de France, although Pemoline was a legal substance at that time. In the 1979 Tour de France he tested positive for 'hormones'.
- A Belgian doctor, Professor Michel Debackere, perfected a test for the detection of Pemoline, an amphetamine-like drug, and caught three of the biggest names in Belgium: Eddy Merckx, Freddy Maertens and Michel Pollentier.

=== 1978 ===
- Michel Pollentier of Belgium was caught trying to cheat the drugs control with someone else's urine in a rubber bulb in his shorts after victory at Alpe d'Huez. He was ejected from the Tour. Ironically his own urine tested negative. See Doping at the Tour de France - The Pollentier incident
- José Nazabal of Spain anticipated a positive test at the Tour de France, and so left the race immediately after being tested. See Doping at the Tour de France - The Pollentier incident
- Antoine Gutierrez of France caused doctor Le Calvez to be suspicious during a test, thus raising his jersey to reveal a system of tubes and a bottle of urine. See Doping at the Tour de France - The Pollentier incident
- Gilbert Glaus of Switzerland, the World Amateur Champion, tested positive for steroids.
- Jean-Luc van den Broucke of Belgium confessed that "In the Tour de France, I took steroids. That is not a stimulant, just a strengthener. If I hadn't, I would have had to give up. What do you think? I'm on the bike all year from February onwards, I have to do well in the classics in all the little races, and also in the Tour de France. On the first rest day, before we went into the Pyrenees, I had a first hormone injection. I had another one on the second day, at the start of the last week. You can't call that medically harmful, not if it's done under a doctor's control and within reason." See Doping at the Tour de France - Steroids and allied drugs

=== 1979 ===
During the 1979 Tour de France, the leader of the mountains classification Giovanni Battaglin tested positive for doping in stage 13. He was penalized by 10 minutes in the general classification, lost the points that he earned in stage 13 and received 10 penalty points in the mountains classification. Battaglin was still able to win the mountains classification.

Frans Van Looy and Gilbert Chaumaz also tested positive for doping during the Tour. After the Tour de France had finished, Joop Zoetemelk was found to have used doping, which he confessed later. Zoetemelk was penalized by 10 minutes in the general classification, but kept his second place.

== 1980s ==
=== 1980 ===
- Vicente López Carril of Spain, died on 29 March 1980 aged 37 from a heart attack. His death was noted by Willy Voet in his book Massacre à la chaîne although he acknowledged the impossibility of proving the link between these early deaths and the drugs taken while racing.
- Freddy Maertens of Belgium, admitted to the French newspaper L'Équipe, after his retirement, that "like everyone else", he had used amphetamines in round-the-houses races but he insisted that he had ridden without drugs in important races - not least because he knew he would be tested for them.
- Dietrich Thurau ("Didi") of Germany tested positive on 3 occasions in 1980 and again in 1987. After he stopped his career in 1989, he admitted in an interview in Bild that he used doping, and that most cyclists did.

=== 1982 ===
- Maarten Ducrot was a Dutch professional road bicycle racer. In January 2000, on the Dutch TV-show Reporter, he admitted that he had used cortisone and testosterone, as well as Synacthen, "a very bad medicine", and he still regrets using it. Ducrot said he used synacthen in 1982 when he was an amateur.
- Ángel Arroyo of Spain, received a penalty for testing positive for the stimulant Methylphenidate (Ritalin) on stage 17 of the 1982 Vuelta a España. Three other riders also failed the doping test after stage 17 for the same drug: Alberto Fernández, Vicente Belda and Pedro Muñoz Machín Rodríguez. Methylphenidate was a popular performance-enhancing drug in cycling at that time. Arroyo and his team denied the allegations and asked for a second analysis of the sample. The B analysis confirmed the first positive test. Arroyo was assigned a 10-minute penalty and stripped of his Vuelta win which was given to Marino Lejarreta. With the 10-minute penalty Arroyo went down to 13th place in the overall classification. The disqualification of the winner of the Vuelta has been called the worst scandal that has ever hit the race on the official La Vuelta website.
- Marc Demeyer of Belgium died on 20 January 1982, aged 31 from a heart attack. His death was noted by Willy Voet in his book Massacre à la chaîne although he acknowledged the impossibility of proving the link between these early deaths and the drugs taken while racing.
- Steven Rooks was a Dutch cyclist whose professional career ran from 1982 to 1995. On the Dutch TV-show Reporter in 2000, Rooks admitted (together with Maarten Ducrot and Peter Winnen) that they had doped in their careers. Rooks said he used testosterone and amphetamines during his whole 13-year career. In 2009, he extended his confession, by also admitting the use of EPO after 1989, which was something he took together with two other Dutch riders Gert Jakobs and Mathieu Hermans.
- Willy Voet wrote about Bert Oosterbosch riding the 1982 Grand Prix des Nations in his 2002 book Massacre à la Chaîne ("Breaking The Chain"). Oosterbosch was flat from the start due to the Synacten he had taken. The drugs initially blocked his ability to work hard. An hour after the injection it started working as planned and his tempo increased. Note - Voet may have been referring to the 1979 or 1984 events.
- Bernard Hinault refused to submit to a doping control at the 1982 Critérium de Callac and was fined and given a one-month conditional suspension.

=== 1983 ===
- Adri van der Poel the Dutch world cyclocross champion and Tour de France stage winner tested positive for strychnine. He said that his father-in-law had served a pigeon pie for Sunday lunch, and only when he tested positive did he realise that the pigeons had been doped with strychnine.
- Track rider Fernando Vera of Chile was disqualified after testing positive for a banned substance at the 1983 Pan American Games.

=== 1984 ===
- Francesco Moser of Italy broke the hour record of Eddy Merckx in 1984. In 1999, he admitted blood doping to prepare for the attempt, helped by sports doctor Francesco Conconi. Such doping had not been declared illegal at the time.
- John Beckman, Brent Emery, Steve Hegg, Pat McDonough, Leonard Nitz, Rebecca Twigg and Mark Whitehead of the U.S. admitted to receiving blood transfusions in preparation for the 1984 Summer Olympic Games in Los Angeles. (See Systematic Blood Doping below for details) The practice was not against Olympic rules although Games medical guidelines discouraged it. The U.S. team coach Eddie Borysewicz set up a clinic in motel room. The US federation banned blood-doping in January 1985.

Systematic blood doping at the 1984 Summer Olympic Games in Los Angeles. The U.S. cycling team's successes were coloured by revelations that riders had blood transfusions before their events, a practice known as blood-doping. The transfusions were to increase red blood cells in riders' blood. That would take more oxygen to their muscles. They received the blood of others with similar blood types. The practice, instigated by national coach Eddie Borysewicz, was not against Olympic rules although Games medical guidelines discouraged it. Borysewicz and a colleague, Ed Burke, set up a clinic in a Los Angeles motel room and four of the seven athletes who had transfusions won medals. The U.S. federation banned blood-doping in January 1985. Borysewicz and Burke were fined a month's pay. Mike Fraysse, a former president of the federation, was demoted from first to third vice-president.

Riders who received transfusions included Steve Hegg, who won a gold and a silver, and Rebecca Twigg, Pat McDonough and Leonard Nitz who all won silver medals. The others who received transfusions were John Beckman, Mark Whitehead and Brent Emery. The rest of the team had refused.

=== 1986 ===
- Peter Winnen is a Dutch former road racing cyclist. He was professional from 1980 until 1991. In January 2000, on the Dutch TV-show Reporter, Winnen admitted that he had doped. He came third in the 1983 Tour de France (undoped) but he said that in the 1986 Tour de France "I was very bad and had the choice: go back to home or to provide me with testosterone." - Winnen reached Paris. During his career with Raleigh, Panasonic and Buckler, Winnen used testosterone, amphetamines and corticosteroids.

=== 1987 ===
- Kim Andersen of Denmark tested positive for doping in 1987, and was banned for life, a sentence that was later changed to a one-year quarantine. In 1992 he was tested positive again, and fired from his team. He rode as an individual for the rest of the year, before finally retiring.

=== 1988 ===
- Pedro Delgado of Spain tested positive for probenecid at the 1988 Tour de France. Probenicid interferes with chemicals which the kidneys secrete, and thus aroused a suspicion that he was using it as a masking agent for steroid use. Though other sports governing bodies, such as the IOC, recognized probenecid as a doping agent, the Union Cycliste Internationale (UCI), which oversaw cycling, did not, and thus Delgado was allowed to continue in the event without sanction.
- Gert-Jan Theunisse of the Netherlands tested positive for testosterone in a blood test during the Tour de France and received a ten-minute penalty which moved him from fourth to eleventh place overall. He admitted in 2000 to using illegal substances during his career, according to an interview published by the Dutch regional newspaper Dutch "Eindhovens Dagblad". He confessed "to having used a great deal of Celestone", a corticoid, but he denied having taken testosterone.
- Geert Van de Walle of Belgium died on 26 November 1988, aged 22, from a heart attack. His death was noted by Willy Voet in his book Massacre à la chaîne although he acknowledged the impossibility of proving the link between these early deaths and the drugs taken while racing.
- In 1988, the first rider was banned for using EPO.

The emergence of EPO - In the late 1980s a recombinant drug created for people suffering from kidney failure became a substance abused by athletes seeking enhanced stamina and performance. The drug is recombinant erythropoietin, known as EPO, which was developed by the Amgen company. Recombinant EPO is a bio-manufactured copy of a hormone normally produced in the kidney and was not detectable by any test at the time.

EPO stimulates the bone marrow in order to increase red blood cell production and thus the body's ability to carry oxygen. A study of 15 Swedish athletes by the Stockholm Institute of Gymnastics and Sports found an improvement of nearly 10 percent in aerobic performance. "Average" red blood cell volume of the population at sea level is about 45% red blood cells. About 5% of the population has less than 40% red blood cell, which is defined as "anemia" and 5% of the population, including many world class athletes, have a natural red blood cells volume of 50%... 1% of the population has 54% red blood cell volume.

The increased thickness of the blood (above 70% red blood cells) increases the risk of blood clotting which can block blood vessels causing a heart attack or stroke, especially in the middle of the night when the heart's rate is lowest. Doctors and blood specialists concluded that the drug could have been implicated in the deaths of as many as 18 European professional bicycle racers between 1987 and 1991. One of them was Johannes Draaijer, a 27-year-old Dutch rider who finished 130th in the 1989 Tour de France, and died from a heart attack in February 1990. Although the autopsy did not specify the cause of death, Draaijer's wife later told the German news magazine Der Spiegel that her husband became sick after using EPO.

=== 1989 ===
- Laurent Fignon of France tested positive for amphetamines at the Grand Prix de la Liberation in Eindhoven on 17 September 1989.
- Bert Oosterbosch of the Netherlands died on 18 August 1989, aged 32, from a heart attack and poor health. His death was noted by Willy Voet in his book Massacre à la chaîne (translated as "Breaking the Chain") although he acknowledged the impossibility of proving the link between these early deaths and the drugs taken while racing. It is widely presumed, but not proven, that the death is attributable to EPO use but this is disputed. Voet also talked about Oosterbosch riding the 1982 Grand Prix des Nations. Oosterbosch was flat from the start due to the Synacten he had taken. The drugs initially blocked his ability to work hard. An hour after the injection it started working as planned and his tempo increased. In fact, Voet may have been referring to the 1979 or 1984 events.
- Johan van der Velde of the Netherlands undertook hospital treatment for his addiction to amphetamines at the end of his career. He said in an interview with the author Jan Siebelink ("Pijn is genot") that he had trouble coping when that success began to dry up. Van der Velde said he remembered shivering at the start of an Italian race, the skin of his arms wrinkled in goosebumps, because of the amphetamine he had taken just to start. He was also disqualified from the 1981 Liège–Bastogne–Liège race.
- Sean Yates tested positive in the first stage of Torhout-Werchter.

== 1990s ==
=== 1990 ===
- Johannes Draaijer from the Netherlands. It is widely presumed, but not proven, that his death was attributable to EPO use. The autopsy did not specify the cause of death, but Draaijer's wife later told the German news magazine, Der Spiegel, that her husband became sick after using EPO.
- Belgian Nico Emonds tested positive after winning the third stage of the 1990 Vuelta a España. He was stripped from his victory and set to the last place of the stage.
- Steven Rooks was a Dutch cyclist whose professional career ran from 1982 to 1995. On the Dutch TV-show Reporter in 2000, Rooks admitted (together with Maarten Ducrot and Peter Winnen) that they had doped in their careers. Rooks said he used testosterone and amphetamines during his whole 13-year career. In 2009, he extended his confession, by also admitting the use of EPO after 1989, which was something he took together with two other Dutch riders Gert Jakobs and Mathieu Hermans.

The PDM Affair, In November 1997, Cyclingnews.com reported about an inquiry that had just been made public in The Netherlands. This inquiry appeared to reveal doping in the PDM cycling team. The doctor of the team from between 1990 and 1991 was Wim Sanders who was the centre of the investigation which was reported to have been initiated when the General Manager of the team, Manfred Krikke, called the FIOD (Fiscal Information and Investigation Service) to investigate the medical business of the team. It was said that Wim Sanders supplied anabolic steroids and EPO to the team and was responsible for the "intralipid affair" of the 1991 Tour de France, when the entire team withdrew due to what was reported at the time as food poisoning. In a 2008 TV documentary; team members and team doctor Wim Sanders explain how the cause was in fact careless storage of Intralipid, a nutritional aid with which the team members had been injected.

According to cyclingnews.com, 1990 was the height of the drug taking in the team and during this year, two riders had to stop with acute heart problems; whether this refers to stopping with professional cycling or performance-enhancing drugs is unclear. Team manager Gisbers denied any knowledge of doping in the team.

=== 1991 ===
- Carey Hall, an Australian track cyclist, tested positive for the use of banned substances and lost the medal he won in the World Championship at Stuttgart and placed on probation for 6 months.
- Sean Kelly of Ireland was described in Willy Voet's book 'Massacre à la Chaine': He won the Tour of Lombardy three times (1983, 1985, 1991 (also won amateur version in 1976)) and on at least one occasion he did it with the help of a corticoide injection. Kelly was controlled positive after Paris–Brussels in 1984 and that came as a surprise because he used the urine of a mechanic. But the mechanic was using a banned substance himself because he had to work long hours at night and needed the lift to stay awake."
- Stephen Pate, the Australian track cyclist, tested positive for the use of banned substances and lost the medal he won in the World Championship at Stuttgart and placed on probation for 6 months.
- Jesper Skibby of Denmark released his autobiography in November 2006, in which he confessed to having used doping for more than 10 years. In 1991 he started using steroids, in 1992 growth hormones and testosterone, and finally by 1993 he was also using EPO. He claimed that he requested the drugs himself, and he did not name any other riders or contacts in the book.

PDM. Some teams used sophisticated recovery techniques whereby riders were put on a drip during the night and fed nutrients such as Vitamin B12. This practice was blamed when the entire PDM team went down with a fever on the 10th Stage of the Tour de France. PDM management blamed a virus although only riders were infected. Ten days later a press release stated that the team had used recovery substances which were past their sell-by date.

=== 1992 ===
- Jesper Worre from Denmark tested positive for use of amineptine, a stimulant drug, which had been prohibited on 1 January that same year. He admitted the offence and received a conditional quarantine. He is now particularly known for his strong and uncompromising struggle against the use of doping in professional cycling.
- Óscar Vargas tested positive for caffeine after winning stage 20 of the 1992 Vuelta a España. He was stripped of his result and given a three-month suspension.

=== 1993 ===
- Claudio Chiappucci from Italy, confessed in 1997 that he had used drugs from 1993 to 1995, but later retracted that statement. Chiappucci used the practice of Doctor Conconi, who was accused of providing EPO to cyclists. Conconi was found 'morally guilty', but was acquitted, because the evidence was considered insufficient to definitively prove that his involvement led to the deliberate ingestion of drugs by riders. The judge had looked at medical reports of 33 cyclists in the period 1993–1995, including Chiappucci's, and all blood tests showed largely fluctuating hematocrit-values, indicative for EPO-use.
- Lennie Kristensen from Denmark tested positive for a stimulant drug. The Danish Cycling organisation banned him but the UCI did not.
- Stephen Roche of Ireland. According to an investigation in Italy into the practices of Francesco Conconi, Roche was involved in the case, having received EPO in 1993. In May 1990, Paul Kimmage published Rough Ride exposing apparently endemic drug use in the peloton, and Roche threatened litigation. It was reported in the Rome newspaper, la Repubblica, in January 2000 that Francesco Conconi, a professor at the University of Ferrara involved with administering EPO to riders on the Carrera Jeans–Vagabond with which Roche had some of his best years, had provided riders including Roche with EPO. Roche denied the allegations. This was further reported in the Irish Times several days later, Roche again denying EPO. In March 2000 the Italian judge Franca Oliva published a report detailing the investigation into sports doctors including Conconi. This official judicial investigation concluded that Roche was administered EPO in 1993, his last year in the peloton. Files part of the investigation allegedly detail a number of aliases for Roche including Rocchi, Rossi, Rocca, Roncati, Righi and Rossini. In 2004 Judge Oliva alleged that Roche had taken EPO during 1993 but due to the statute of limitations, neither Roche nor his teammates at Carrera would be prosecuted.

=== 1994 ===
- Joachim Halupczok from Poland - died, aged 26, on 5 February 1994. In 1988 he was the World Champion cyclist, Olympic Silver medalist, and was voted 'best athlete in Poland'. In 1990 he turned professional and took part in the World Championships in Japan, but in autumn that year health problems (heart arrhythmia) caused his retirement from the sport, aged 24. It was suspected that the problems was associated with the abuse of drugs (EPO). His death was also noted by disgraced soigneur Willy Voet in his book Massacre à la chaîne although he acknowledged the impossibility of proving the link between these early deaths and the drugs taken while racing. Joachim never tested positive for EPO. Professor Romuald Lewicki from Zakład Medycyny Sportowej WAM in Łódź (Institute of Sports Medicine) claims that Halupczok's cardiac arrhythmia was genetic because his father and son suffer from the same condition
- Gianni Bugno from Italy in August was found positive to caffeine on the occasion of an anti-doping check.

=== 1995 ===
- Bo Hamburger from Denmark admitted taking EPO from 1995 to 1997 in his 2007 autobiography. He had vociferously denied taking banned substances throughout his active career.
- Marco Pantani of Italy recorded a haematocrit level of 60.1% in the Milan-Turin race in October.

=== 1996 ===
- Rolf Aldag of Germany admitted having used erythropoietin (EPO) in preparation for the 1996 Tour de France on 24 May 2007. In the press conference with Erik Zabel, they said that he experimented with EPO.
- Udo Bölts of Germany confessed publicly on 23 May 2007 to having used EPO and growth hormones in preparation for the Tour de France in 1996 when he was with Team T-Mobile, and continued in 1997. Consequently, Bölts resigned as the sports director of Team Gerolsteiner on 24 May 2007
- Bert Dietz of Germany confessed publicly on 23 May 2007 to having used EPO in preparation for the Tour de France in 1996 when he was with Team T-Mobile, and continued in 1997.
- Christian Henn of Germany used banned substances (including EPO) while riding for the T-Mobile team in the mid-1990s, which he admitted in May 2007.
- Brian Holm of Denmark admitted doping during the 1990s in his 2002 autobiography. This did not cost him his job as manager for the Danish national team, despite some concern about him being a role model for the young riders. In May 2007 he admitted having used EPO on two occasions in 1996 at Team Telekom.
- Levi Leipheimer of the United States used a banned substance as an amateur during the 1996 U.S. National Criterium Championships, when he lapped the field. It was later reported by VeloNews that Leipheimer tested positive for a banned substance after the Championship, and a disciplinary panel recommended that he return his title. The Leipheimer family confirmed the violation, claiming that Levi had innocently used the allergy medicine Claritin-D to relieve hay fever symptoms. The family claim that USA Cycling later relaxed its standards regarding the use of allergy medicines; however, ephedrine remains a banned substance. USA Cycling's official records name Matt Johnson as the 1996 event's champion.
- Rita Razmaite of Lithuania tested positive for Bromantan. She was suspended, along with a Russian coach and a Belarusian doctor, by the International Olympic Committee.
- Bjarne Riis of Denmark won the 1996 Tour de France under the effects of EPO, growth hormone and cortisone. On 25 May 2007, he admitted "for a time doping was a part of everyday life for me".
- Filippo Simeoni of Italy admitted in 2002 that he was instructed by doctor Michele Ferrari in 1996 and 1997 on how to use the EPO and Human Growth Hormone that were prescribed. He also testified in court that he had used doping since 1993. Dr. Ferrari was also Lance Armstrong's doctor and this led to a public falling-out at the 2002 Tour de France. In 2001 and 2002 Simeoni was suspended for several months for doping use.
- Erik Zabel of Germany, on 24 May 2007, admitted having used Erythropoietin (EPO) in preparation for the 1996 Tour de France. In the press conference he said that he experimented with EPO for a week, but then stopped due to severe side effects. Zabel also publicly apologized for having lied about his use of EPO in the past.

The Telekom Affair – In May 2007, several former riders admitted to using banned substances (including EPO) while riding for the team in the mid-1990s, including Erik Zabel, Rolf Aldag, Brian Holm, Bjarne Riis, Bert Dietz, Udo Bölts and Christian Henn including the seasons in which Riis and Jan Ullrich won the Tour de France. Team doctors Andreas Schmid and Lothar Heinrich also confessed to participating and administering banned substances. The latter was Team Telekom's sporting director until 3 May 2007, when he was suspended following allegations published in former team member Jef d'Hont's book.

On 25 May 2007, Riis issued a statement confessing to taking EPO, growth hormone and cortisone for five years, from 1993 to 1998, including during his victory in the 1996 Tour de France. Earlier in the week, five of Riis' former teammates from Team Telekom confessed to having used banned substances during the 1990s when Riis won the Tour. Riis said that he bought and injected the EPO himself, and team coach Walter Godefroot turned a blind eye to the drug use on the team. Riis was removed from the official record books of Tour de France, but in July 2008 he was written back into the books along with additional notes about his use of doping.

=== 1997 ===
- Djamolidine Abdoujaparov from Uzbekistan became the first rider to be disqualified from the 1997 Tour de France for taking banned substances after testing positive for Bromantan and the bronchodilator, Clenbuterol. It was later revealed that he had tested positive for drugs after six races in 1997, including the Tour de France. He was subsequently banned for a year after the Union Cycliste Internationale (UCI) appealed against a six-month ban imposed by the Uzbekistan Cycling Federation, claiming it was too lenient.
- Gilles Bouvard of France told French investigators in July 1998 that he had been supplied with drugs when he was on the Festina team in 1997 and also while he was on the Casino team during the Liege-Bastogne-Liege race in 1998.
- Brian Dalgaard Jensen of Denmark confessed in a DR TV documentary in March 2003, to using EPO during his career, especially during his 1997 success in Belgium. In 2004 he was awarded an anti-doping prize for his openness.
- Rune Jogert of Norway tested positive for Ephedrine during a stage race in Germany (the Berliner 4-Etappen-Fahrt). He was suspended for 2 months from 1 February 1998, fined 500 Swiss francs ($US345) and lost 15 UCI ranking points. Additionally the Norwegian Cycling Federation was fined 5,000 Swiss francs (about $US3,500) because it had not taken any action against Rune Jogert and not told the UCI.
- Emmanuel Magnien of France admitted on 28 July 1998 that he had doped when with his former team Festina.
- Michael Skelde from Denmark tested positive for testosterone.

=== 1998 ===
- Laurent Brochard of France was ejected from the Tour de France on 17 July 1998 with the entire Festina team. On 24 July he confessed being doped in the Tour by EPO, amphetamines, corticosteroids, nandrolone and Human Growth Hormones (HGH). He was suspended by the French Cycling Federation for six months from 1 November 1998 until 1 May 1999.
- Francesco Casagrande of Italy was caught in March 1998 with a positive testosterone finding. He was suspended for 6 months, later increased to 9 months from September 1998 until June 1999, and sacked by Cofidis.
- Laurent Dufaux of Switzerland was ejected from the Tour de France on 17 July 1998 with the entire Festina team. On 24 July 1998 he confessed being doped throughout the past 3 years with EPO, and received an 8-month suspension from 1 October 1998 until 1 June 1999.
- Pascal Hervé of France was ejected from the Tour de France on 17 July 1998 with the entire Festina team. On 25 October 2000 he admitted to doping (with amphetamines, cortisone and EPO) during the 1998 Tour de France. Beside of a short self-imposed suspension, he was given a 2-month suspension from 1 February until 31 March 2001.
- Luc Leblanc of France, the 1994 world champion, admitted to the court in the Festina trial (after having retired in 1999), that he had used performance-enhancing EPO to prepare for the Tour de France, Giro d'Italia and Vuelta a España throughout 1994–1998. He claimed the reason he started to use EPO in 1994 (while riding at the Festina team), was because he achieved a clean 5th place in the 1991 Tour de France, and then for the subsequent two years suddenly found he could not keep up with the pace of the peloton without. "It is true, but I could have taken a lot more to win these races", said Leblanc. He was riding for Team Polti in the 1998 Tour, where he opted to abandon the race in sympathy with the Festina riders. Despite confessing to doping use when riding all the Grand Tours, he insisted to have won the Rainbow Jersey in 1994 without any help of illegal substances. As the statute of limitation was only five years in 1994, his confession came at a time when he anyway did not risk to lose his title. As his confession moreover came at a time when he had retired, his national federation did not bother to launch disciplinary proceedings against him.
- Rodolfo Massi of Italy was arrested by the French police in the 1998 Tour de France for possession of cortisone, and was alleged to have sold EPO to several riders. He was thrown out of the Tour while wearing the Mountain's jersey. He was however only convicted guilty of the first part of the charge, and along with a fine of US$1800 he received a six-month suspension from the Italian Cycling Federation from 1 November 1998 until 1 May 1999.
- Armin Meier of Switzerland was ejected from the Tour de France on 17 July 1998 with the entire Festina team. On 24 July, he confessed using EPO throughout the past two years, along with amphetamines and growth hormones. He was suspended 8 months by the Swiss Cycling Federation from 1 October 1998 until 1 June 1999.
- Christophe Moreau of team Festina was ejected from the Tour de France on 17 July 1998 with the entire Festina team. On 24 July he confessed to using EPO and amphetamines. He served a six-month suspension by the French Cycling Federation from 1 November 1998 until 1 May 1999.
- Per Pedersen of Denmark, who raced the Tour de France on four occasions in the 1990s, and worked for Team CSC as a directeur sportif in 2001, confessed that he during his active career had used cortisone – but only in the days where it had not yet been added to the prohibited list of substances.
- Didier Rous of France was ejected from the Tour de France on 17 July 1998 with the entire Festina team. He confessed using EPO in the Tour, and was suspended by the French Cycling Federation for six months from 1 November 1998 until 1 May 1999.
- Neil Stephens of Australia was ejected from the Tour de France on 17 July 1998 with the entire Festina team, and although admitting he had taken EPO intravenously, he claimed to have doped unknowingly as the team had told him it was vitamin supplements. He was not suspended by his national federation, but decided to stop his active career at the same time he made his confession.
- Richard Virenque of France was ejected from the Tour de France on 17 July 1998 with the entire Festina team. On 24 October 2000, he admitted using doping (EPO, cortisone, ACTH, and growth hormones) at the 1998 Tour de France. On 22 December 2000, he was cleared by the French court from the criminal charge of "inciting the administration of doping and masking products to others and complicity in the importation of drugs". On December 30, 2000, the Swiss cycling federation gave him a nine-month ban and a 4,000 Swiss franc fine for his confessed doping use, which shortly afterwards was changed to a 6.5 months suspension by CAS from 1 February 2001 until 14 August 2001.
- Alex Zülle of Switzerland was ejected from the Tour de France on 17 July 1998 with the entire Festina team. On 24 July he confessed using EPO, growth hormones and amphetamines in the 1998 Tour. His hematacrit level was recorded as 52.3%, whereas the maximum allowed figure is 50%. He also stated in court by September 1998, that he has been employing EPO throughout the past four years (1994–1998); most lately it was administered to him by the Festina team doctor Eric Rijkaert, and while riding for ONCE it was administered to him by the two team doctors Nicolás Terrados and José Aremendi. He was suspended 8 months by the Swiss Cycling Federation from 1 October 1998 until 1 June 1999.
- Stuart O'Grady admitted in July 2013, after publication that a retrospective test had found one of his samples from the 1998 Tour de France positive for EPO, that he indeed had used this substance intensively during the two weeks ahead of the Tour. At this point of time, the positive test was not perceived as an individual rider scandal – but more as proof for a collective peloton behavior, as the retrospective test actually had found 92% of the tested riders (35 out of 38) positive for EPO in this edition of the Tour. As the statute of limitation is 8 years, a disciplinary proceeding was not launched, but the rider decided to retire, and he was also asked to retire from his recently appointed post in the Australian Olympic Committee.
- Nancy Contreras and Belem Guerrero were stripped from their medals won during the 1998 Central American and Caribbean Games, when they failed the doping test with Pseudoephedrine. Contreras have won the gold in the 500m time trial and Guerrero the gold in the points race and the bronze medals in 3000m Individual Pursuit and road race. The Dr. José Angel Covarrubias, then Contreras doctor, was later sanctioned.

The Festina Affair is the events that surround several doping scandals, doping investigations and confessions of riders to doping that occurred during and shortly after the 1998 Tour de France. The affair began when a large haul of doping products was found in a car of the Festina cycling team just before the start of the race, which led to a large-scale police investigation against the Festina Team, this was followed by the re-opening of a separate police investigation case into the TVM team, and a subsequent searching of many teams during the race for possession of illicit doping substances. The affair highlighted systematic doping and suspicion of a widespread network of doping in many teams of the Tour de France, and was characterised by the constant negative publicity of the cases, police searches of hotels, a spate of confessions by retired and current riders to doping, the detainment and arrest of many team personnel, protests by riders in the race, as well as mass withdrawal of several teams from the race.

=== 1999 ===
- Uwe Ampler tested positive for steroids and high testosterone level during the Sachsen Tour in August 1999. He admitted his error, blaming a cocktail of drugs taken during a bout of influenza.
- Frankie Andreu admitted in September 2006 that he had taken EPO to help prepare for the 1999 Tour de France, when he was riding for the US Postal team.
- Lance Armstrong tested positive for corticoids during the 1999 Tour de France. The small amounts of corticoids in a urine sample were explained by the prescription for skin cream (saddle sores / boil / allergy) that he subsequently presented to the UCI, thus he was cleared of any offence. He later admitted that saddle sores were a cover story for actually doping.
- Ludo Dierckxsens was removed from the Tour de France by his Lampre team after winning the 11th stage. At the post race drugs test he told the race doctor about his use of the corticoid Synacthene (Tetracosactide) under prescription to treat a knee injury from the previous month.
- Claus Michael Møller of the Dutch TVM team tested positive for banned substances and received a 2-year ban
- Marco Pantani, winner of the 1998 Giro d'Italia and the Tour de France, faced an automatic two-week suspension while leading the 1999 Giro d'Italia for a suspiciously high red blood cell count (52%) which could have meant that the rider had taken the banned substance EPO.
- Laurent Roux is a French former road bicycle racer. In 1999, he was found guilty of using amphetamines in the Flèche Wallonne race, and was suspended for six months. In 2002, he was again tested positive for amphetamines after an out of competition control, and received a 4-year suspension. In June 2006 he confessed at a doping trial in Bordeaux, that while being suspended he had both consumed and sold the drug known in the peloton as "pot Belge" (a mixture of amphetamines, caffeine, and sometimes cocaine and heroin), and he also confessed, that throughout his active career from 1994 to 2002 he had used EPO, human growth hormone, cortisone and testosterone.

1999 Tour de France - In 2005 the French sports daily L'Équipe accused Lance Armstrong of using the performance-enhancing drug EPO during the race. For years, it had been impossible to detect the drug, called erythropoietin, until UCI began using a urine test for EPO in 2001. According to the newspaper, tests on 1999 urine samples were done to help scientists improve their detection methods. The newspaper said 12 samples had revealed EPO use, including six from Armstrong. In 2006 a UCI appointed independent lawyer, Emile Vrijman, released a report in 2006 claiming that Lance Armstrong should be cleared of any suspicion surrounding the retrospective testing of the 1999 Tour de France. Vrijman denounced the manner in which the doping laboratory in Châtenay-Malabry carried out its research, claiming that there were too many procedural and chain of custody gaps. The World Anti-Doping Agency (WADA) rejected it, calling it defamatory to WADA and its officers and employees, as well as the accredited laboratory involved.

In that same year, a second French daily newspaper, Le Journal du Dimanche, reported that Spanish rider Manuel Beltrán, Danish Bo Hamburger and Colombian Joaquim Castelblanco were suspected of being among those whose frozen urine samples reportedly tested positive.

== 2000s ==
=== 2000 ===
- Eugeni Berzin was prevented from starting the 2000 Giro d'Italia because of Haematocrit level (due to the use of EPO) above 50%.
- Neil Campbell tested positive at a World Cup track meeting in Turin on 13 July and at the British Championships on 29 July. Both samples showed higher concentrations of human chorionic gonadotrophin (HCG) than permitted.
- Jan Hruška from the Czech Republic was thrown out of the 2000 Sydney Olympic Games after testing positive for an unspecified banned substance.
- Emmanuel Magnien of France was banned for three months by the Union Cycliste Internationale (UCI) after testing positive for corticoids during Tour de France.
- Tammy Thomas, US track cyclist, tested positive for testosterone at the 2000 US Olympic trials, and in 2001 tested positive for a previously unseen steroid Norbolethone. She received a lifetime ban from the sport. She was sentenced to five years of probation and six months of home confinement.

=== 2001 ===
- Niklas Axelsson tested positive for EPO in the 2001 UCI Road World Championships in Lisbon and later admitted his guilt. He was suspended for four years by the Swedish Cycling Federation but made an early comeback in 2004.
- Riccardo Forconi tested positive for blood doping/EPO use prior to the Giro d'Italia.
- Dario Frigo was expelled from the Giro d'Italia after police discovered banned substances in his hotel room. In 2005 he was arrested and banned from the Tour de France after police found 10 doses of erythropoietin (EPO) in his wife's car.
- Marcin Gębka of Poland was excluded from the 2001 Peace Race after failing a hematocrit test prior to the event. He was one of three riders for the Polish CCC Mat team who received a two-week ban.
- Bjoern Glasner of Germany and Team Cologne was excluded from the 2001 Peace Race after failing a hematocrit test prior to the event. He received a two-week ban.
- Bo Hamburger becomes the first rider to test positive for EPO under a new system introduced by the UCI in 2001. Hamburger was later acquitted by the Danish Sports Federation after irregularities in the handling of Hamburger's B sample analysis. Hamburger denied ever taking any banned substances, but in 2007 he published a book and revealed that he took EPO from 1995 to 1997.
- Pascal Hervé tested positive for EPO after the prologue in 2001 Giro d'Italia.
- Roland Meier from Switzerland tested positive for EPO at the end of la Flèche Wallonne on April 18. The Swiss Cycling Federation (SRB) stated that the B sample 'counter-evaluation' was carried out by the IUML (University Institute of Forensic medicine) in Lausanne and it confirmed the first analysis. He was suspended for 8 months by the SRB.
- Marco Pantani was banned for six months after an insulin syringe was found in his room at the Giro d'Italia. On appeal the ban was lifted.
- Piotr Przydzial of Poland was excluded from the 2001 Peace Race after failing a hematocrit test prior to the event. He was one of three riders for the Polish CCC Mat team who received a two-week ban.
- Ondřej Sosenka of the Czech Republic was excluded from the 2001 Peace Race after failing a hematocrit test prior to the event. He was one of three riders for the Polish CCC Mat team who received a two-week ban.
- Tammy Thomas, US track cyclist, tested positive for a previously unseen steroid Norbolethone. She received a lifetime ban from the sport.

2001 Giro d'Italia - The Giro was overshadowed by a series of scandals related to doping. Police raided the hotels of several teams during the race, uncovering a variety of banned substances. Italian Dario Frigo, who was fighting for the race lead at the time, was expelled from the race as a result. The week prior to the raid saw Pascal Hervé and Riccardo Forconi expelled from the race after testing positive for EPO. Italian police carried out anti-drugs raids on a number of hotels in the town of San Remo where the participants of the race were staying. About 200 officers were involved in the raid. Police officers search the rooms of riders from all 20 teams, confiscating medicines. The organizers decided to cancel the 18th stage after second-placed Dario Frigo was sacked by Fassa Bortolo team after illegal drugs were found in his room. Frigo later admitted carrying them as security in case he needed a boost during the final stages of the race. Italian Marco Pantani was banned for six months after an insulin syringe was found in his room. On appeal the ban was lifted.

=== 2002 ===
- Nicola Chesini was detained by Italian police as part of an investigation into the supply of performance-enhancing drugs during the 2002 Giro d'Italia. Chesini was taken from his hotel near Cuneo after the fifth stage of the Giro d'Italia.
- Stefano Garzelli, the 2000 Giro d'Italia winner, tested positive for the banned diuretic and masking agent probenecid, and was expelled from the Giro d'Italia. He was given a nine-month ban.
- Jef D'hont was a masseur to professional cycling teams. In 1998, he was involved in a major doping scandal during the Tour de France, namely the Festina affair. For his involvement in doping in the Française des Jeux team, he got a 9-month prison term on probation in December 2000. In April 2007, he exposed the doping practices of the Team Telekom in the 1990s, and admitted his own use of amphetamines in 1963.
- Bas van Dooren, mountain biker from the Netherlands, tested positive for EPO in 2002 from a test two days before the 2002 UCI Mountain Bike & Trials World Championships, where he finished 11th. He bought it in Germany via internet and replied that 'it was a gamble'. He was suspended for one year and ended his career.
- David McCann, from Northern Ireland, tested positive for the Norandrosterone in 2002 during the Tour of Austria, which returned a reading 3 nanograms above the permitted blood concentration of the substance. Laboratory tests showed the presence of a legal glutamine supplement he was using contained norandrosterone not listed on the label. This evidence led to him being given the minimum allowed six-month suspension and fined 2000 Swiss Francs.
- In 2002, Gianpaolo Mondini was sacked from US Postal after it was revealed that police found EPO and growth hormones in his hotel room during the 2001 Giro d'Italia. He admitted using illegal substances. The Italian National Olympic Committee (CONI) demanded suspension of up to four and a half years for possession and use of the drug EPO and possession of insulin.
- Lars Brian Nielsen tested positive for high levels of caffeine and was removed from the Danish National Team for the World Championships in Ballerup in September. It was the second time Nielsen has been caught relating to doping. In 1997, he was found to have taken nandrolone and was suspended for two years.
- Kirk O'Bee of the US tested positive for an elevated testosterone-epitestosterone ratio at the 2001 USPRO Championships in Philadelphia on 10 June 2001 and received a 1-year suspension. O'Bee declared that his positive drug test "resulted from a special training regimen recommended by his coach, which involved dietary supplements and exercise."
- Juan Pineda of the US tested positive for 19-norandrosterone and 19-noretiocholanolone at the First Union Invitational in Lancaster, Pennsylvania on 4 June 2002. He received a 2-year suspension on 25 September 2002 from the USADA.
- Piotr Przydzial from Poland (CCC-Polsat) tested "non-negative" for EPO, at the 55th Peace Race/Course de la Paix in the Czech Republic. He was tested after the fourth stage that finished in Chemnitz on 13 May 2002. Both Przydzial's A and B samples showed signs of EPO and he faced a two-year ban. Prior to the start of the 2001 Peace Race, Przydzial and Sosenka failed a hematocrit test (above 50%) and were not allowed to start.
- Raimondas Rumsas was given a four-month suspended prison sentence in January 2006 by the Bonneville court for the importation of prohibited doping substances during the 2002 Tour de France where he finished third. His wife Edita was given the same sentence with a 3,000 euros fine on identical charges, while Polish doctor Krzysztof Ficek was handed a 12-month suspended sentence for prescribing the drugs. Edita Rumsas was arrested and jailed for 3 months after French police discovered a cocktail of performance-enhancing drugs including growth hormone and EPO in her car. She had claimed that the drugs were for her mother-in-law.
- Stefan Rütimann of Switzerland was given a 4-year ban by the Swiss Olympic Committee (COS) after testing positive for testosterone on May 5 during the Tour de Romandie. Rütimann declined to have his B test analysed, and was given a heavy suspension as he had also tested positive for banned substances in May 2001, when he was suspended for seven months.
- Roberto Sgambelluri was expelled from the Giro d'Italia after becoming the first professional cyclist to be caught using NESP, a stronger and longer lasting form of EPO. However, NESP is not produced naturally by the body, and is therefore easy to detect by doping tests as it stays in the body for a long time.
- Gilberto Simoni, the 2001 Giro d'Italia winner, tested positive for cocaine and was withdrawn from the Giro d'Italia, but was later cleared by the Italian Cycling Federation.
- Frank Vandenbroucke was arrested after the Belgium state highway patrol intercepted Bernard Sainz for travelling in excess of the speed limit and found a large quantity of amphetamines and syringes in the car. Sainz, known in the cycling world as Doctor Mabuse, said he was leaving Frank Vandenbroucke's home, which led to the police searching the cyclist's residence, where they found EPO, morphine and clenbuterol. On 21 March Vandenbroucke was handed a six-month ban and a 10,000 Swiss francs fine by the Belgian federation.
- Faat Zakirov was expelled from the Giro d'Italia after becoming the first professional cyclist to be caught using NESP, a stronger and longer lasting form of EPO. However, NESP is not produced naturally by the body, and is therefore easy to detect by doping tests as it stays in the body for a long time. He received a one-year ban plus a one-year suspended ban from the Court of Arbitration for Sport (CAS), the Union Cycliste Internationale (UCI) announced on 17 April 2003.

=== 2003 ===
- Mario De Clercq of Belgium was implicated in a doping affair involving both trafficking and taking banned performance-enhancing drugs, human growth hormone and Aranesp, a genetically engineered recombinant EPO. The ring included six riders plus four others including the chief defendant, Belgian veterinarian Jose Landuyt. De Clercq used human growth hormone and Aranesp, a synthetic drug which increases red blood cell levels, which Museeuw obtained from Landuyt. On 24 January 2007, Museeuw confessed to these charges. The court proceedings were adjourned until 23 September 2008, pending a ruling from the Constitutional Court on the point of law.
- Igor González de Galdeano of Spain missed the Tour de France because of a six-month doping ban imposed on him by France's Council for Prevention and Fight against Doping (CPLD) after testing positive for Salbutamol during the 2002 Tour de France, as well after the final stage of the 2002 Midi Libre. The UCI did not consider the Tour de France positive as a doping offense, and began a face-off with the World Anti-Doping Agency (WADA), which insisted the case was indeed one of doping. The UCI declared that there was no limit placed on the amount salbuamol used under prescription.
- Philippe Gaumont of France admitted during police interrogation to an ongoing pattern of EPO use that continued into the 2003 Tour de France This was the end of a career in which in 1996 he tested positive for nandrolone in two races. In 1998 he tested positive twice for the nandrolone drug, but the case was dismissed. In 1999, a blood test conducted in the "Docteur Mabuse" justice case showed he was positive for amphetamines. In 2005 he wrote a book, Prisonnier du dopage ("Prisoner of doping") describing doping methods, masking methods and financial pressures.
- Geneviève Jeanson of Canada recorded a hematocrit level in excess of the allowable limit while with the Canadian National Team preparing for the World Championships in Hamilton, Ontario, in late 2003. She was required to withdraw from competition for two weeks. She explained the finding by reference to an oxygen tent which she used as part of her conditioning and training program. After years of denial, in an investigative documentary broadcast on Radio-Canada (the French-language CBC) on 20 September 2007, Jeanson acknowledged having taken EPO more or less continuously since age 16 (circa 1998).
- Jesús Manzano of Spain admitted doping during the 2003 season. The UCI summary of 'Decisions on Anti-Doping Rule Violations made in 2007' stated that he was "Acquitted for legal reasons." He is famous as the whistleblower of systematic doping in Spanish cycling and his statements led the Guardia Civil to conduct the Operación Puerto investigation around the sport doctor Eufemiano Fuentes.
- Johan Museeuw of Belgium was implicated in a doping affair accusing him of both trafficking and taking banned performance-enhancing drugs. The ring included six riders (Mario De Clercq, Jo Planckaert and Chris Peers) plus four others including the chief defendant, Belgian veterinarian Jose Landuyt. Museeuw used human growth hormone which he obtained from Landuyt. The police recorded phone calls where Museeuw spoke of wasps (the Dutch word wesp rhymes with aranesp), a codeword for Aranesp, a synthetic drug which increases red blood cell levels. On 24 January 2007, Museeuw confessed to these charges. The court proceedings were adjourned until 23 September 2008, pending a ruling from the Constitutional Court on the point of law.
- Scott Moninger of the US was suspended for one year due to contaminated supplements which contained the banned substance - 19-norandrosterone. These supplements were bought off the shelf of the local Boulder, Colorado supplement store. It was later proven by lab results from the same batch of supplements that the banned substance was not labeled on the product container. Although Moninger was suspended, he is considered to be a clean rider by his peers.
- Amber Neben of the US tested positive for the banned substance 19-norandrosterone after the Montreal World Cup race. Neben chose to appeal the case to the Court of Arbitration for Sport and, in the meantime, accepted a provisional suspension which began in mid-July 2003. She claimed that it was the result of taking supplements which were contaminated with the banned substance. A formal hearing of the North American CAS Panel reported in October 2003, that a doping violation had occurred, but further stated that it was not an intentional doping violation. She was suspended for 6 months from any race activity dating back to the beginning of her voluntary withdrawal. In December 2007 Neben filed a lawsuit in a California district court against Hammer Nutrition, maker of Endurolytes, alleging that the product contained unlisted substances that caused all three plaintiffs to produce positive doping tests.
- Chris Peers was implicated in a doping affair involving both trafficking and taking banned performance-enhancing drugs, human growth hormone and Aranesp, a synthetic drug which increases red blood cell levels. The ring included six riders plus four others including the chief defendant, Belgian veterinarian Jose Landuyt. On 24 January 2007, Johan Museeuw confessed to the charges. The court proceedings were adjourned until 23 September 2008, pending a ruling from the Constitutional Court on the point of law.
- Jo Planckaert of Belgium was implicated in a doping affair involving both trafficking and taking banned performance-enhancing drugs, human growth hormone and Aranesp, a synthetic drug which increases red blood cell levels. The ring included six riders plus four others including the chief defendant, Belgian veterinarian Jose Landuyt. On 24 January 2007, Johan Museeuw confessed to the charges. The court proceedings were adjourned until 23 September 2008, pending a ruling from the Constitutional Court on the point of law.
- Mark Roland of Australia was suspended for two years by the Australian Sports Anti-Doping Authority (ASADA) in September 2008 for having used prohibited substances in 2003 and 2004, although he never tested positive. He was found to have used human growth hormone on two occasions in 2003 and the anabolic steroid DHEA twice in 2003 and once in 2004. The World Anti-Doping Agency applied an eight-year statute of limitations.
- Raimondas Rumsas of Lithuania received a one-year ban after testing positive for EPO during the 2003 Giro d'Italia, in which he finished sixth overall.
- Adham Sbeih of the US, a former U.S. national time trial champion, tested positive in August 2003 for EPO. He was the first U.S. cyclist to be found guilty of taking EPO and he received a two-year ban.

Oil for Drugs was an Italian doping case against doctor Carlo Santuccione and a number of accomplices, started in 2003. He was accused of administering prohibited doping products to professional and amateur athletes, to enhance their performance as well as being involved in doping network across Italy.

=== 2004 ===
- David Fuentes of the US tested positive for an anabolic steroid at the Redlands Bicycle Classic. He protested the USADA and controversially raced, and won, during this protest period. He was ultimately found guilty and sentenced to a two-year suspension that included the year of protest in which he raced and won. He was never ordered to return any of his winnings.
- Lizandro Ajcú of Guatemala tested positive for Erythropoietin in the 46th Vuelta a Guatemala in 2005.
- Joey D'Antoni, received a 2-year suspension on 24 September from the United States Antidoping Agency. The track racer from Raleigh, North Carolina, tested positive for recombinant human Erythropoietin (rHuEPO)
- Christophe Brandt of Belgium tested positive for methadone during the Tour de France. He believed the test was a result of a tainted nutritional supplement that he had taken to cure a liver problem. The chemist who had prepared Brandt's prescription confirmed he had been working with methadone on the same day that he had prepared Brandt's prescription. His Lotto team fired him, but after he was exonerated by the Belgian Cycling Federation he was rehired.
- Dave Bruylandts of Belgium tested positive for EPO use in 2004 and was banned for 18 months.
- David Calanche of Guatemala tested positive for Erythropoietin in the 46th Vuelta a Guatemala in October 2004.
- María Luisa Calle of Colombia lost her bronze medal after testing positive for heptaminol. The Colombian Olympic Committee appealed the decision, and in November 2005 she got her medal back.
- Oscar Camenzind of Switzerland tested positive on 22 July for the banned drug EPO and was barred from attending the Olympic Games. Although he accepted full responsibility for the positive test, his cycling career became questionable after being fired by his Swiss professional cycling team Phonak. Soon after this occurrence, he announced his retirement from professional cycling.
- Stefano Casagranda and Martin Hvastija were asked to leave the 2004 Tour de France after race organisers received a letter from Padova's financial brigade, saying the riders were under investigation in Italy on doping charges.
- Yeisson Delgado of Venezuela tested positive for Erythropoietin in the 46th Vuelta a Guatemala in October 2004.
- Carlos López González of Mexico tested positive for Erythropoietin in the 46th Vuelta a Guatemala in October 2004.
- Abel Jocholá of Guatemala tested positive for Erythropoietin in the 46th Vuelta a Guatemala in October 2004.
- Danilo Di Luca was not eligible to participate in the Tour de France as he was under investigation by Italian officials for doping. Di Luca was recorded in several phone conversations with Eddy Mazzoleni in which he allegedly talked about doping products, the investigation led to Di Luca's non-participation in the 2004 Tour de France.
- Tyler Hamilton won the gold medal in the men's individual time trial at the 2004 Summer Olympics in Athens. That medal was placed in doubt on 20 September 2004, after it was revealed that he had failed a test for blood doping (receiving blood transfusions to boost performance) at the Olympics. Two days after the announcement of his positive test result at Athens, the IOC announced that Hamilton would keep his gold medal because results could not be obtained from the second, backup sample. The Athens lab had frozen the backup sample, which made it impossible to repeat the blood doping test. Hamilton also tested positive for blood doping at the 2004 Vuelta a España, where he won the April 8 stage. In April 2005 he was banned for two years for blood doping. The UCI summary of 'Decisions on Anti-Doping Rule Violations made in 2006' stated that for Homologous Blood Transfusion he would be sanctioned to "disqualification and ineligibility for 2 years".
- Jesus Manzano of Spain exposed doping practices in a series of articles in the Spanish newspaper Diario AS in March 2004. This included his use of EPO, Cortisone, Testosterone, Human Growth Hormone, Nandrolone, Oxyglobin, and the extreme practices to administer them. The revelations were so strong that Spanish investigations were begun, and these in turn led to Operación Puerto.
- Filip Meirhaeghe the Belgian Mountain biker, tested positive for EPO at an out of competition control on June 25, two days before round 5 of the mountain bike World Cup in Mont St Anne, Canada, which he won. The 33-year-old World Champion told the Belga newsagency that he will stop competitive cycling immediately.
- Noel Armando Vazquez Mendoza of Venezuela tested positive for Erythropoietin and Nicethamide in the 46th Vuelta a Guatemala in October 2004. In July 2005 he was sanctioned by the Federacion Venezolana De Ciclismo, involving a four-year suspension from 10 November 2004 to 9 November 2008, disqualification of the race, and a fine of CHF 1,000.
- David Millar of Great Britain was preparing for competition in the 2004 Tour de France and track events at the 2004 Summer Olympics when police searched his house in June 2004, finding used Epogen syringes. Millar confessed to the use of EPO on three occasions: in August 2001 before the Vuelta a España, in May 2003 before the Critérium du Dauphiné Libéré and in September 2003 before the World men's individual time trial championships. He was handed a two-year suspension.
- Janet Puiggros Miranda of Spain became the second Spanish athlete to commit a doping offence at the Olympics after also testing positive for EPO during a pre-Olympic test. Like Gonzalez, she was withdrawn from competing (in the Women's Cross-Country race). She also denied the administration of a "B Test", which is used to verify the first drug test.
- Federico Muñoz of Colombia tested positive for Erythropoietin in the 46th Vuelta a Guatemala in October 2004.
- José Reynaldo Murillo of Spain tested positive for Erythropoietin in the 46th Vuelta a Guatemala in October 2004.
- Santiago Pérez of Phonak team tested positive for a blood transfusion on 5 October, just over a week after he finished second in the 2004 Vuelta a España.
- Nery Velásquez of Guatemala tested positive for Erythropoietin in the 46th Vuelta a Guatemala in October 2004.
- Jeremy Yates of New Zealand who spent two years racing for Belgian teams, tested positive for high levels of testosterone after a race in Wanzele in March. The Belgian cycling federation banned him for two years plus a fine of $NZ900 plus costs.

=== 2005 ===
- Erwin Bakker of the Netherlands tested positive for Testosterone at Mont Sainte-Anne, Canada, on 26 March 2005, and for EPO on 23 June 2005 at an out of competition control. He was disqualified and sacked by his team, Heijdens-Ten Tusscher. The UCI summary of 'Decisions on Anti-Doping Rule Violations made in 2006' stated both "disqualification and ineligibility for 2 years and life" respectively.
- Roberto Ballestero of Costa Rica tested positive for Phentermine on 23 December 2005. The UCI summary of 'Decisions on Anti-Doping Rule Violations made in 2006' stated "disqualification and ineligibility for 2 years".
- Marc Lotz of the Netherlands resigned at Quick·Step - Innergetic on 1 June when EPO was found in his house and he admitted using. The team accepted his resignation and he was suspended for two years in general and for four years for the UCI Pro-Tour. On October 3, 2008, the Belgium court gave him a 16,500 Euro fine for possession of EPO.
- Ludovic Capelle tested positive for EPO at a race on 7 June. He was initially suspended for 18 months by Belgian Cycling Federation but Capelle appealed his ban on a technicality. In the middle of December the Belgian Council of State overturned the suspension and Capelle was cleared on a procedural error of a testing officer.
- Maurizio Carta of Poland tested positive for Clostebol on 24 September 2005. The UCI summary of 'Decisions on Anti-Doping Rule Violations made in 2006' stated "disqualification and ineligibility for 2 years".
- Ferney Orlando Bello Clavijo of Colombia tested positive for Stanozolol on 9 August 2005. The UCI summary of 'Decisions on Anti-Doping Rule Violations made in 2006' stated "disqualification and ineligibility for life".
- Barry Forde of Barbados tested positive for Testosterone on 28 October 2005. The UCI summary of 'Decisions on Anti-Doping Rule Violations made in 2006' stated "disqualification and ineligibility for 2 years and 2 months".
- Evgeni Petrov was ejected from the 2005 Tour de France on stage 10. Tests carried out in the morning found his haemetocrit to be over the legal 50% level. He was banned from cycling for two weeks 'for health reasons'.
- Dario Frigo, was ejected from the 2005 Tour de France before the start of stage 11. Police found ten doses of EPO in his wife's car as part of a border-crossing search. The couple were arrested for carrying prohibited substances. In September 2008 the court in Albertville gave him and his wife, Susanna, a six-month suspended prison sentence and an €8757 fine.
- Fabrizio Guidi tested positive for EPO on 17 August. The test was taken at the HEW Cyclassics on 31 July. Guidi's B test came back negative for EPO and the team's temporary suspension against him was lifted.
- Fredy Hamlet of France tested positive for Heptaminol on 16 July 2005. The UCI summary of 'Decisions on Anti-Doping Rule Violations made in 2006' stated "disqualification and ineligibility for 1 year".
- Nelito Hereida of the Dominican Republic tested positive for EPO on 17 September 2005. The UCI summary of 'Decisions on Anti-Doping Rule Violations made in 2006' stated "disqualification and ineligibility for life".
- Roberto Heras, the winner of an unprecedented fourth Vuelta a España, tested positive for EPO prior to the penultimate stage of the 2005 Vuelta a España. He was stripped of his 2005 Vuelta win and the victory was given to Russian Denis Menchov. The UCI summary of 'Decisions on Anti-Doping Rule Violations made in 2006' stated "disqualification and ineligibility for 2 years".
- Danilo Hondo of Germany tested positive for the stimulant Carphedone at the Vuelta de Murcia and subsequently received a 2-year suspension.
- Giorgio Landaeta of Venezuela tested positive for Norandrosterone and Noreticholanolone on 30 August 2005. The UCI summary of 'Decisions on Anti-Doping Rule Violations made in 2006' stated "disqualification and ineligibility for 2 years".
- Iñigo Landaluze, made his breakthrough by winning the 2005 Critérium du Dauphiné Libéré, but it was soon announced he had tested positive for abnormally high testosterone and was suspended from racing until his case was heard out. In 2006, however, he was cleared to return to racing after he showed that the lab conducting tests committed procedural errors. The UCI then failed to show that those errors did not affect the outcome of the tests. The CAS panel reviewing the case said that it was "probable" that Landaluze had committed a doping violation, but the UCI had failed to meet its burden of proof in the case. New revisions to the WADA Code would suggest that Landaluze would have lost his case under the new rules. The UCI summary of 'Decisions on Anti-Doping Rule Violations made in 2006' states 'Acquitted for legal reasons'
- Jenaro Ramos Lozano of Spain tested positive for Stanozolol on 8 April 2005. The UCI summary of 'Decisions on Anti-Doping Rule Violations made in 2006' stated "disqualification and ineligibility for 2 years".
- Gabriel Pop of Romania "Failed to Comply" with test procedures on 22 April 2005. The UCI summary of 'Decisions on Anti-Doping Rule Violations made in 2006' stated "ineligibility for 2 years".
- Jorge Coto Riviera of Costa Rica tested positive for testosterone on 23 December 2005. The UCI summary of 'Decisions on Anti-Doping Rule Violations made in 2006' stated "disqualification and ineligibility for 2 years".
- Sandro Rodriguez of Bolivia tested positive for Norandrosterone on 10 November 2005. The UCI summary of 'Decisions on Anti-Doping Rule Violations made in 2006' stated "ineligibility for life".
- Francisco Pérez Sanchez tested positive twice for EPO during the 2003 Tour de Romandie when he won two stages and took the overall lead in spectacular fashionrace. He was suspended for 18 months from 18 October 2003 to 17 April 2005.
- Zinaida Stahurskaya, the former world champion from Belarus tested positive at three European races in 2005, - once to anabolic steroid stanozolol and twice to hormone testosterone. In 2006 she was banned for 2 years. It was not her first positive test for doping substances, nor her first suspension: At the Giro d'Italia Femminile in 2001, she returned a positive test for a diuretic, and at the Circuito di Massarosa in 2003, for ephedrine. She was out of competition for four and two months respectively.

=== 2006 ===
- Wilmer Bravo of Venezuela tested positive for Prednisolone and Prednisone on 9 January 2006. The UCI summary of 'Decisions on Anti-Doping Rule Violations made in 2006' stated "disqualification and ineligibility for 4 months".
- Garcia Quesada Adolfo of Spain tested positive for Human chorionic gonadotropin (hCG) in competition on 19 May 2006. The UCI summary of 'Decisions on Anti-Doping Rule Violations made in 2007' stated "disqualification and ineligibility for 2 years."
- Stephen Alfred of the US, tested positive for Human chorionic gonadotropin (hCG) in an 'out of season' test on 26 March, and an 'in competition' test on 10 June 2006. Further tests indicated that his testosterone imbalance resulted from the presence of exogenous testosterone. He was suspended for 8 years by the USADA. The UCI summary of 'Decisions on Anti-Doping Rule Violations made in 2007' stated "disqualification and ineligibility for 8 years."
- Victor Hernandez Baeta of Spain tested positive for EPO in an 'out of competition' test on 4 July 2006. The UCI summary of 'Decisions on Anti-Doping Rule Violations made in 2007' stated "disqualification and ineligibility for 2 years."
- Ivan Basso was expelled from the Tour de France in the week prior to its commencement due to his involvement in the Operación Puerto doping case On 30 April 2007 Team Discovery Channel announced that Basso would be released from his contract on Basso's request. While still claiming to never have actually engaged in blood doping, Basso admitted contacting Dr. Fuentes' clinic with the intention to engage in blood doping. On 15 June 2007, Basso received a two-year ban.
- Pawal Bentkowski of Poland tested positive for Norandrosterone on 25 July 2006. The UCI summary of 'Decisions on Anti-Doping Rule Violations made in 2006' stated "disqualification and ineligibility for 2 years".
- Jaime Bretti of Chile tested positive for Phentermine in competition on 4 May 2006. The UCI summary of 'Decisions on Anti-Doping Rule Violations made in 2007' stated "disqualification and ineligibility for 2 years."
- Santos Gonzalez Capilla of Spain tested positive for Triamcinolone acetonide on 4 March 2006. The UCI summary of 'Decisions on Anti-Doping Rule Violations made in 2006' stated "disqualification, warning and reprimand".
- Jose Balague Carvajal of Chile tested positive for Ephedrine 'in competition' on 11 May 2006. The UCI summary of 'Decisions on Anti-Doping Rule Violations made in 2007' stated "disqualification and ineligibility for 2 years."
- Erick Castano of Ecuador tested positive for Metelonone on 14 May 2006. The UCI summary of 'Decisions on Anti-Doping Rule Violations made in 2006' stated "disqualification and ineligibility for 2 years".
- Luis Coelho of Portugal tested positive for Norandrosterone, Clenbuterol, and hCG in competition on 15 July 2006. The UCI summary of 'Decisions on Anti-Doping Rule Violations made in 2007' stated "disqualification and Ineligibility for 1 year".
- Juan Cotumba of Bolivia tested positive for Benzoylecgonine, methylecgonine, and cocaine metabolites on 11 May 2006. The UCI summary of 'Decisions on Anti-Doping Rule Violations made in 2006' stated "disqualification and ineligibility for 2 years".
- Jhon Cunto of Peru tested positive for Norandrosterone in competition on November 9, 2006. he UCI summary of 'Decisions on Anti-Doping Rule Violations made in 2007' stated "disqualification and ineligibility for 2 years."
- Kamil Dominian of Poland tested positive for Stanozolol on May 20, 2006. The 'Union Cycliste Internationale' (UCI) summary of 'Decisions on Anti-Doping Rule Violations made in 2006' stated "disqualification and ineligibility for 2 years".
- David Garbelli of Italy tested positive for Triamcinolone acetonide and salbutamol on 9 June 2006. The UCI summary of 'Decisions on Anti-Doping Rule Violations made in 2006' stated "disqualification and warning".
- Christoph Girschweiler of Switzerland tested positive for Salbutamol and salmeterol in competition on 21 July 2006. The UCI summary of 'Decisions on Anti-Doping Rule Violations made in 2007' stated "disqualification and warning".
- Aitor González, the winner of the 2002 Vuelta a España, tested positive twice in 2005, first during an out of competition test in August, and again during the 2005 Vuelta a España for a methyltestosterone metabolite. González claimed that the positive test was the result of a contaminated dietary supplement called Animal Pack prescribed by a doctor. González was handed a two-year ban and retired soon afterwards. The UCI summary of 'Decisions on Anti-Doping Rule Violations made in 2006' listed 17 alpha methyl, 5 beta androstane, 3 alpha 17 beta dio and a 2-year ban.
- Oscar Grau of Spain tested positive for Finasteride. The UCI summary of 'Decisions on Anti-Doping Rule Violations made in 2006' states "disqualification and ineligibility for 2 years".
- Jon Pena Hernaez of Spain tested positive for Phentermine in competition on 1 August 2006. The UCI summary of 'Decisions on Anti-Doping Rule Violations made in 2007' stated "disqualification and ineligibility for 2 years."
- Christina Alcade Huertanos from Spain was disqualified for 2 years. The UCI summary of 'Decisions on Anti-Doping Rule Violations made in 2006' listed Triamcinolone acetonide and a 2-year ban.
- Jörg Jaksche was one of the 9 riders held out of the 2006 Tour de France after being identified by investigators in the Operación Puerto investigation. On 30 June 2007 Jaksche admitted he was guilty of blood doping and that he was the Bella mentioned in the documents confiscated from Fuentes' clinic.
- Vladimir Koev of Bulgaria tested positive for Stanozolol on 18 June 2006. The UCI summary of 'Decisions on Anti-Doping Rule Violations made in 2006' states "disqualification and ineligibility for 2 years".
- Rafal Kumorowski of Poland tested positive for cannabis in competition on 4 August 2006. The UCI summary of 'Decisions on Anti-Doping Rule Violations made in 2007' stated "disqualification and warning."
- Floyd Landis was fired from the Phonak team on 5 August 2006, after a test result indicated an abnormally high testosterone/epitestosterone ratio after stage 17 of the 2006 Tour de France. On 20 September 2007, he was stripped of his title as winner of the 2006 Tour and placed under a two-year ban from professional racing, following an arbitration panel's 2 to 1 ruling. He appealed the result of the arbitration hearing to the Court of Arbitration for Sport, which subsequently upheld the panel's ruling. He remained suspended until 30 January 2009.
- Maxime Lefebvre of France 'Failed to Comply' with the 'in competition' testing on 29 December 2006 and 2 January 2006. The UCI summary of 'Decisions on Anti-Doping Rule Violations made in 2006' states "disqualification and ineligibility for life".
- Christian Luce of France. The UCI summary of 'Decisions on Anti-Doping Rule Violations made in 2006' listed Testosterone and a 3-year ban.
- Joseph M. Papp of the US tested positive for metabolites of testosterone or its precursors (6?-OH-androstenedione 6?-OH-androsterone) on 7 May 2006, at the International 42nd Presidential Cycling Tour of Turkey. He received a 2-year suspension. When he testified for the U.S. Anti-Doping Agency (USADA) at the Floyd Landis trial he also stated that he had graduated to testosterone after starting on EPO (erythropoietin) in 2001.
- Evandro Luis Portela of Brazil tested positive for Phentermine and Stanozolol on 23 March 2006. The UCI summary of 'Decisions on Anti-Doping Rule Violations made in 2006' states "disqualification and ineligibility for life".
- Aitor Osa from Spain was involved in the Operación Puerto doping case. The Guardia Civil in Madrid linked numbers used by Dr. Fuentes to identify blood sample bags to names; number 1 to Ullrich, number 2 to Basso, number 4 to Botero, number 5 to Sevilla, number 7 to Aitor's brother, Unai Osa, number 8 to Aitor Osa himself.
- Unai Osa from Spain was involved in the Operación Puerto doping case. The Guardia Civil in Madrid linked numbers used by Dr. Fuentes to identify blood sample bags to names; number 1 to Ullrich, number 2 to Basso, number 4 to Botero, number 5 to Sevilla, number 7 to Unai Osa himself, and number 8 to his brother Aitor Osa.
- Cénéric Racault of France tested positive for Prednisolone and Prednisone. The UCI summary of 'Decisions on Anti-Doping Rule Violations made in 2006' states "disqualification and ineligibility for 18 months".
- Ilaria Rinaldi of Italy tested positive for Testosterone in competition on 18 July 2006. The UCI summary of 'Decisions on Anti-Doping Rule Violations made in 2007' stated "disqualification and ineligibility for 2 years."
- Jose Antonio Pastor Roldan of Spain tested positive for Terbutaline on 19 June 2006. The UCI summary of 'Decisions on Anti-Doping Rule Violations made in 2006' stated that he was sanctioned by 'disqualification and a warning'.
- Alexandre Sabalin of Moldavia tested positive for Strychnine on 26 May 2006. The UCI summary of 'Decisions on Anti-Doping Rule Violations made in 2006' stated that he was sanctioned by 'disqualification and Ineligibility for 1 year'.
- Michele Scarponi was implicated in the Operación Puerto case. On 8 May 2007, Scarponi confessed his role in the case. On 15 May, Scarponi was provisionally suspended.
- Ger Soeperberg of the Netherlands tested positive for Salbutamol on 2 July 2006. The UCI summary of 'Decisions on Anti-Doping Rule Violations made in 2006' stated that he was sanctioned by 'disqualification and warning'.
- Alvaro Tardaguila from Uruguay tested positive for r-EPO in February 2006, and received a 2-year ban.
- Fernando Torres of Spain tested positive for Ephedrine in competition on 8 July 2006. The UCI summary of 'Decisions on Anti-Doping Rule Violations made in 2007' stated "disqualification and ineligibility for 2 years - (under appeal by rider)."
- Matteo Trentin of Italy tested positive for Salbutamol 'in competition' on 26 December 2007. The UCI summary of 'Decisions on Anti-Doping Rule Violations made in 2007' stated "disqualification and ineligibility for 2 months."
- Jan Ullrich was expelled from the Tour de France in the week prior to its commencement due to his involvement in the Operación Puerto doping case.
- Sascha Urweider was suspended by Team Phonak after a positive A-test for testosterone. Urweider blamed a nutritional supplement he bought without team doctors advise.
- Tristan Valentin of France tested positive for Heptaminol on 6 June 2006. The UCI summary of 'Decisions on Anti-Doping Rule Violations made in 2006' states "disqualification and ineligibility for 6 months".
- Jordi Reira Valls of Spain tested positive for Stanozolol and hCG on 16 May 2006. The UCI summary of 'Decisions on Anti-Doping Rule Violations made in 2006' states "disqualification and ineligibility for 2 years".

2006 Tour de France was marred by doping scandals. Prior to the tour, numerous riders - including the two favourites Jan Ullrich and Ivan Basso - were expelled from the Tour due to their link with the Operación Puerto doping case. After the end of the race, the apparent winner Floyd Landis was found to have failed a drug test after stage 17; Landis contested the result and demanded arbitration. On 20 September 2007 Landis was found guilty and suspended retroactive to 30 January 2007 and stripped of the 2006 Tour de France title making Óscar Pereiro the title holder.

Operación Puerto doping case (meaning Operation Mountain Pass) is a Spanish doping case against doctor Eufemiano Fuentes and a number of accomplices, started in May 2006. He is accused of administering prohibited doping products to 200 professional athletes, to enhance their performance. Tour de France's favorites Jan Ullrich and Ivan Basso were expelled from the Tour de France before the race started.

=== 2007 ===
==== Positive doping tests ====
Date	Cyclist	Banned substance	Reference
4 March	Giuseppe Muraglia (ITA)	hCG	Brown, Gregor (June 11, 2007). "Giuseppe Muraglia positive for hCG". Latest Cycling News. autobus.cyclingnews.com.
24 April	Aketza Peña (ESP)	Nandrolone	Abrahams, Ben; Johnson, Greg; Verkuylen, Paul (May 30, 2007). "Peña positive for nandrolone". First Edition Cycling News.
8 June	Patrik Sinkewitz (GER)	Testosterone	
19 July	Cristian Moreni (ITA)	Testosterone	
21 July	Alexander Vinokourov (KAZ)	Homologous transfusion	
24 July	Iban Mayo (ESP)	EPO	
1 August	Andrey Kashechkin (KAZ)	Homologous transfusion	
24 December	Thomas Dekker (NED)	EPO	

==== Doping cases ====
- Ivan Basso of Italy was suspended by Discovery Channel on 24 April when the Italian National Olympic Committee (CONI) reopened his case on behalf of his involvement in the Operación Puerto doping case. On 30 April 2007 Team Discovery Channel announced that Basso would be released from his contract on Basso's request. While still claiming to never have actually engaged in blood doping, Basso admitted contacting Dr. Fuentes' clinic with the intention to engage in blood doping. On 15 June 2007, Basso received a two-year ban. The time he had already spent under team suspension whilst riding for CSC and temporary suspension since leaving Discovery were taken into consideration which meant his ban would end on 24 October 2008.
- Lorenzo Bernucci (Leonardo) of Italy tested positive for Sibutramine on 15 August and was fired from T-Mobile in September 2007. He purchased it over the counter at a pharmacy in Italy to help keep his weight under control and said he had been taking it for four years, unaware it had been added to the list of banned substances. The UCI summary of 'Decisions on Anti-Doping Rule Violations made in 2007' stated "disqualification and ineligibility for 1 year."
- Danilo Di Luca of Italy was revealed to have had unspecified low hormone levels in urine tests during the 2007 Giro d'Italia. Italian authorities investigated whether this was a natural consequence of racing at a high level for three weeks, or some kind of masking agent. On 28 September, Di Luca withdrew from the UCI Road World Championships calling his treatment "a scandal" after he had been accused of doping allegations. Di Luca was leading the 2007 UCI ProTour when he was suspended from the competition before the final race, the Giro di Lombardia, due to alleged involvement in the Oil for Drugs doping case, for which he received a three-month suspension through the close season.
- Marco Fertonani of Italy tested positive for using testosterone during the 2007 Tour Méditerranéen and was immediately suspended by the Caisse d'Epargne team. He is contesting the case, citing errors in the testing procedure at the laboratory. The UCI summary of 'Decisions on Anti-Doping Rule Violations made in 2007' stated "disqualification and ineligibility for 2 years".
- Alesandro Fatato of Italy "Failed to Comply" with the testing procedures in competition on 14 January 2007. The UCI summary of 'Decisions on Anti-Doping Rule Violations made in 2007' stated "disqualification and ineligibility for 1 year."
- Franklin Gomes de Almeida of Brazil tested positive for Stanozolol 'in competition' on 12 April 2007. The UCI summary of 'Decisions on Anti-Doping Rule Violations made in 2007' stated "disqualification and ineligibility for 2 years."
- Serhiy Honchar of Ukraine was sidelined from T-Mobile Team's 2007 Giro d'Italia squad after a blood test showed abnormalities in blood tests conducted during Liège–Bastogne–Liège and the Tour of Romandie. Its contract was later terminated for violations of the Team Code of Conduct,.
- Mathias Kessler of Germany was suspended by Astana on 27 June 2007, for failing a drugs test for testosterone taken in Charleroi in April 2007. He was then fired on 13 July.
- Cristian Moreni of Italy tested positive for Testosterone 'in competition' on July 19, 2007. The UCI summary of 'Decisions on Anti-Doping Rule Violations made in 2007' stated "disqualification and ineligibility for 2 years.".
- Giuseppe Muraglia of Italy tested positive for hCG after winning the 2007 edition of Clásica de Almería on 4 March 2007. The UCI summary of 'Decisions on Anti-Doping Rule Violations made in 2007' stated "disqualification and ineligibility for 2 years.". He was also sacked from his team, Acqua & Sapone.
- Magno Prado Nazaret of Brazil tested positive for Sibutramine 'in competition' on 27 April 2007. The UCI summary of 'Decisions on Anti-Doping Rule Violations made in 2007' stated "disqualification and ineligibility for 8 months."
- Nathan O'Neill of Australia. On 6 November 2007 his contract with the Health Net Pro Cycling Team was terminated after a positive test for the appetite suppressant drug phentermine O'Neill had a prescription for Phentermine, which meant his possession of it was legal, but its use failed to meet the guidelines of the UCI/WADA code and that set out by the team's medical director.
- Leonardo Piepoli of Italy tested positive for Salbutamol (>1000 ng/ml) on both 22 and 30 May 2007. The UCI summary of 'Decisions on Anti-Doping Rule Violations made in 2007' stated "Acquitted due to medical reasons."
- Aketza Peña of Spain and the Euskaltel–Euskadi team tested positive for the anabolic steroid nandrolone on 30 May 2007. The sample was taken after stage one of the Giro del Trentino on 24 April and was announced during the 2007 Giro d'Italia. The UCI summary of 'Decisions on Anti-Doping Rule Violations made in 2007' stated "disqualification and ineligibility for 2 years".
- Alessandro Petacchi of Italy tested positive for Salbutamol (>1000 ng/ml) 'in competition' on 23 May 2007. The UCI summary of 'Decisions on Anti-Doping Rule Violations made in 2007' stated "Acquitted due to medical reasons. (under appeal by NADO and World Anti Doping Agency (WADA))".
- Juan Carlos Rojas Villegas of Costa Rica tested positive for Phentermine 'in competition' on 4 May 2007. The UCI summary of 'Decisions on Anti-Doping Rule Violations made in 2007' stated "disqualification and ineligibility for 2 years".
- José Antonio Pecharroman Fabian from Spain tested positive for Finasteride 'in competition' on 26 August 2007. The UCI summary of 'Decisions on Anti-Doping Rule Violations made in 2007' stated "disqualification and ineligibility for 2 years".
- Svetlana Semchouk of Ukraine tested positive for cannabis 'in competition' on 27 September 2007. The UCI summary of 'Decisions on Anti-Doping Rule Violations made in 2007' stated "disqualification and warning".
- Patrick Sinkewitz of Germany tested positive for testosterone at the Tour de France 2007. Sinkewitz failed to start Stage 9 after colliding with a spectator the previous day. On 18 July 2007, Sinkewitz "A" blood sample tested positive for using testosterone/doping and was on the same day suspended by his team T-Mobile. On 31 July 2007, Sinkewitz was fired by the T-Mobile team after he declined to have his "B" blood sample tested. He also admitted to having used Testogel, a topically applied testosterone ointment. On 3 November, he admitted using banned EPO and blood transfusions in the past.
- Marcin Sobiepanek of Poland tested positive for Norandrosterone 'in competition' on 21 October 2007. The UCI summary of 'Decisions on Anti-Doping Rule Violations made in 2007' stated "disqualification and ineligibility for 2 years".
- Alexander Vinokourov of Kazakhstan tested positive for Homologous Blood Transfusion 'in competition' on 21 July 2007. The UCI summary of 'Decisions on Anti-Doping Rule Violations made in 2007' stated "disqualification and ineligibility for 1 year. (under appeal by UCI)".
- On December 20, Iban Mayo's B sample result was confirmed as positive for EPO by the LNDD. On the same day, Björn Leukemans' B sample result was confirmed as being positive for artificial testosterone. Mayo was suspended for two years and never returned to cycling, Leukemans was suspended for the 2008 season.

2007 Tour de France - The event was affected by a series of scandals and speculations related to doping. By the end of the Tour, two cyclists were dismissed for testing positive, the wearer of the yellow jersey, Michael Rasmussen was voluntarily retired by his team for lying about his whereabouts and missing doping tests. A fourth rider was confirmed to having used doping while in a training session prior to the 2007 Tour and a fifth rider tested positive late in the race, with his result being officially announced just after the end of the Tour. Along the way, two teams contesting the competition were asked to withdraw due to positive tests of at least one member.

=== 2008 ===
==== Positive doping tests ====
Date	Cyclist	Banned substance	Reference
3 March	Patxi Vila (ESP)	Testosterone	
11 April	Maximiliano Richeze (ARG)	Stanozolol (steroid)	
28 June	Giovanni Carini (ITA)	EPO	
29 June	Paolo Bossoni (ITA)	EPO	
5 July	Manuel Beltrán (ESP)	EPO	
5 July	Marta Bastianelli (ITA)	Fenfluramine	
8 July	Moisés Dueñas (ESP)	EPO	
8 July	Riccardo Riccò (ITA)	MIRCERA	
23 July	Emanuele Sella (ITA)	MIRCERA	
24 July	Dmitry Fofonov (KAZ)	heptaminol	
31 July	Maria Moreno (ESP)	EPO	
7 October	Leonardo Piepoli (ITA)	MIRCERA	
7 October	Stefan Schumacher (GER)	MIRCERA	
12 October	Bernhard Kohl (AUT)	MIRCERA	

==== Doping cases ====
- Igor Astarloa had his contract terminated in May 2008 by Team Milram following disclosures that he had shown irregular blood values.
- Manuel Beltrán tested positive for EPO after the first stage of the Tour de France. The news broke on 11 July 2008. Blood abnormalities before the Tour start had led French anti-doping agency AFLD to target the rider. Beltrán's team Liquigas withdrew him from the tour with immediate effect. French police questioned Beltrán over possible offences, and searched his hotel room. The B-Sample has not yet been tested.
- Tom Boonen tested positive for cocaine in a test on 26 May 2008. Since this was outside competition he did not face sanctions by the UCI or WADA but was barred from the 2008 Tour de France.
- Paolo Bossoni tested positive for EPO after placing sixth at the Italian National Road Race Championships.
- Giovanni Carini tested positive for EPO after winning the Elite without contract category at the Italian Championships in Boltiere.
- Moisés Dueñas was withdrawn from the Barloworld team before the 11th stage of the Tour de France on 16 July. The official statement from ASO stated that he had tested positive for EPO at the end of the time trial fourth stage. The Barloworld team announced two days later that they were withdrawing from sponsorship after the 2008 Tour de France.
- Danilo Di Luca's appeal was rejected by the Court of Arbitration for Sport (CAS). He had sought to reverse a three-month ban he served for his involvement in the Oil for Drugs doping case. The CAS also rejected the appeal by the Italian National Olympic Committee (CONI), which sought to increase the ban to two years.
- Dmitry Fofonov tested positive for the banned stimulant heptaminol after the 18th stage of the 2008 Tour de France. Fofonov had completed the race in nineteenth place, and was fired by Crédit Agricole after the team was made aware of the positive test.
- Vladimir Gusev was fired from the Astana Team as a result of irregular values detected by its internal anti-doping program run by Doctor Rasmus Damsgaard. However, on June 15, 2009, the Court of Arbitration for Sport decided in Gusev's favor, declared that Astana was wrong in the firing, and ordered that they compensate Gusev for back-pay, legal costs, and damages.
- Floyd Landis lost his final appeal to the Court of Arbitration for Sport. It was concluded from the evidence presented that the presence of exogenous testosterone or its precursors or metabolites in Floyd Landis' sample proved that he violated the anti-doping rules of the UCI. Landis served a full two-year suspension that is back-dated to 30 January 2007. Additionally, Landis was ordered to pay $100,000 in costs to the USADA.
- Eddy Mazzoleni was handed a two-year ban in April 2008 by the Italian Cycling Federation (FCI) for his involvement in the Oil for Drugs affair. The FCI also banned 28-year-old former Ceramica Flaminia rider Domenico Quagliariello for life for his involvement in the same affair.
- Maria Moreno of Spain tested positive for EPO at the Beijing Olympics on 31 July. She left China on the day of the test, before the results were published, and reports in Spain claimed an 'anxiety attack'. IOC communications director Giselle Davies said: "She was tested in the Village and she had already left China that evening before having had the result. The test has come back positive for EPO. The disciplinary commission has ruled that she should be excluded from the Games and have her accreditation withdrawn." The IOC passed the case to the UCI for follow up.
- Alessandro Petacchi was suspended for one year by the Court of Arbitration for Sport (CAS) for having tested positive for an asthma medication during the 2007 Giro d'Italia.
- The Portuguese cycling team LA-MSS had its headquarters searched by police where illegal products were discovered, such as doping substances, medications, equipment to conduct blood transfusions and instruments for clinical use. In June 2008, the Portuguese Cycling Federation (UVP/FCP) suspended nine members of the team temporarily pending the outcome of the investigation; five of which were riders and four were team staff.
- Michael Rasmussen was handed a two-year suspension by the Monaco cycling federation for missed controls before the 2007 Tour de France.
- Riccardo Riccò was kicked out of the 2008 Tour de France on 17 July 2008, after reports that a urine sample tested positive for MIRCERA, a new type of EPO, at the end of stage 4. There had not previously been any public acknowledgment that a test for the new drug was being administered, or had even been developed yet. The Tour de France testing was done under the auspices of the French Cycling Federation and the French Anti-Doping Agency, not the Union Cycliste Internationale.
- Leonardo Piepoli, winner of stage 10 of the 2008 Tour de France, was sacked by his team for "violation of the team's ethics code" the following day, though no positive test had been reported by that date. He confessed to his team manager that he had used MIRCERA, a new 'third generation' type of EPO, the same drug used by his teammate Riccardo Riccò. On 7 October it was reported that Piepoli had tested positive for Continuous Erythropoiesis Receptor Activator on 4 July and 15 July.
- Maximiliano Richeze tested positive for the anabolic steroid stanozolol before the start of the 2008 Giro d'Italia, which resulted in his expulsion from the race, but later the case was dismissed by the Argentinian federation since it was proven Richeze was not to blame. Richeze did however lose the appeal at CAS and was handed a two-year ban.
- Emanuele Sella tested positive for CERA, the third generation EPO, in an out of competition control performed on 23 July 2008. UCI President Pat McQuaid noted that Sella had been targeted based on his actions in and out of racing. At the 2008 Giro d'Italia, Sella had won the mountains classification and three stages.
- Ondřej Sosenka of the Czech Republic, who broke the UCI hour record in 2005, tested positive for the banned stimulant methamphetamine and its metabolites during his national time trial championships in June 2008. He faced a suspension and did not come back to professional racing.
- During the Vuelta a Colombia six riders returned positive doping controls. It was not revealed which substance caused the findings for Rafael Montiel, Juan Guillermo Castro, Camilo Gómez, Carlos Ospina Hernandez, Hernán Buenahora and Giovanni Barriga.
- In May 2008 the UCI revealed that 23 riders were under suspicion of doping following the first phase of blood tests conducted under the new biological passport established at the start of the season. A biological passport is an individual, electronic record for each rider, in which the results of all doping tests over a period of time are collated. Doping violations can be detected by noting variances from an athlete's established levels outside permissible limits, rather than testing for and identifying illegal substances.

=== 2009 ===
- On 11 February, the Italian National Olympic Committee matched DNA samples taken from Alejandro Valverde during a rest day in Italy of the 2008 Tour de France to blood seized in the Operación Puerto investigation. At a February 2009 appearance in front of the Olympic Committee, Valverde maintained his innocence and questioned the Italians' jurisdiction over this case. In May 2009, the Italian Olympic Committee suspended him from competition in Italy for 2 years, effectively barring him from the 2009 Tour de France, which detoured briefly onto Italian soil.
- On April 17, it was announced Tyler Hamilton tested positive for banned steroid Dehydroepiandrosterone (DHEA) after an out-of-competition control in early February. He faces a lifelong ban, and decided to retire with immediate effect.
- On April 29, it was announced former teammates Davide Rebellin and Stefan Schumacher tested positive for Continuous Erythropoiesis Receptor Activator (CERA) during the 2008 Summer Olympics. Schumacher finally admitted to doping in March 2013.
- Christian Pfannberger tested not-negative in an out-of-competition test on March 19. He was suspended by his team Katusha several days before the Giro.
- Tom Boonen tested positive for cocaine in an out of competition test on 27 April. He had previously been found to have taken the same substance in May 2008.
- Antonio Colom tested positive for EPO in an out of competition test on 2 April. He was targeted for additional controls using information from his blood profile. Colom's positive drug test is the second within the ranks of Katusha within five weeks (see Christian Pfannberger).
- On July 1, it was announced that a re-test of an out-of-competition sample collected from Thomas Dekker in December 2007, while Dekker was a member of the Rabobank Team, had shown the presence of EPO. In 2008, Dekker had transferred from Rabobank to Silence-Lotto. Silence-Lotto immediately suspended Dekker.
- On 2 July Clément Lhotellerie was dismissed from Vacansoleil's team roster after the French 23-year-old had tested on methylhexanamine on 28 April of that year. The substance, an active ingredient in nasal congestion medication, is listed on the banned lists of both the UCI and WADA. It is the second time in as many years that Lhotellerie has been dismissed by a team. Despite promising results in Paris–Nice, La Flèche Wallonne and the 4 Jours de Dunkirk, Skil-Shimano dissolved its contract with the rider last year after he failed to attend two appointments with the team.
- On 21 July, it was announced that Russian Ilnur Zakarin was suspended for two years after testing positive to methandienone two years prior. He was 17 years old when he tested positive, and 19 years old when the penalty came into effect.
- On 22 July, it was announced that Danilo Di Luca had tested positive for CERA on 20 and 28 May 2009, during the Giro d'Italia. He was provisionally suspended with immediate effect by the UCI.
- On 31 July 2009, it was announced that Mikel Astarloza had tested positive for Recombinant Erythropoietin (EPO) on 26 June 2009 and was being provisionally suspended by the UCI.
- On 17 September 2009, the German Cycling Federation announced that Olaf Pollack and Markus Cronjäger had been provisionally suspended after returning positive doping controls. Pollack tested positive in an out-of-competition test on July 6 and Cronjäger tested positive after a control conducted at the Rund um den Odenwald on July 11.
- On 18 September 2009, it was announced that Liberty Seguros Continental team riders Nuno Ribeiro, Isidro Nozal and Hector Guerra tested positive for EPO-CERA in controls prior to the Tour of Portugal. Ribeiro went on to win the general classification.
- On 6 October 2009, it was announced that Gabriele Bosisio of the LPR Brakes team had tested positive on EPO during an out-of-competition test in September. Bosisio had won a stage in the 2008 Giro d'Italia.
- On 18 October 2009 South African road and Track rider Nolan Hoffman tested positive for testosterone, he served an 18-month ban after co-operating with Cycling South Africa.

== 2010s ==
=== 2010 ===
- On 29 January 2010, Italian Vania Rossi was reported positive for CERA by the Italian Olympic Committee. The Comitato Olimpico Nazionale Italiano (CONI) controlled Rossi on January 10 after she finished second in the women's national cyclocross championships. Rossi was the partner of Italian professional cyclist Riccardo Riccò, who himself tested positive for CERA at the 2008 Tour de France. Her B sample later came back negative, and she was cleared of all charges.
- On 11 March, Polish brothers Pawel and Kacper Szczepaniak, who finished first and second in the under 23 race of the 2010 UCI Cyclo-cross World Championships, returned positive results for EPO, in controls carried out at the event which took place in Tabor, Czech Republic in January. The two had been targeted after suspicious blood profiles were revealed as part of their respective biological passports. A week later, Kacper Szczepaniak reportedly attempted to commit suicide. On 30 March, Pawel was handed an 8-year ban while Kacper got a 4-year ban.
- Manuel Vazquez Hueso of Spain was found, on 14 March, to have taken EPO, and in January 2011 the UCI handed down a fine of €35,000 and suspension until April 2012.
- On 16 March 2010, Alejandro Valverde's appeal against his ban from riding in Italy was rejected by the Court of Arbitration for Sport. It was confirmed that he could not ride on Italian soil again until 10 March 2011. A UCI press statement, issued after this hearing, stated that "the UCI expresses its determination to take the necessary measures to secure a suspension that is applicable internationally." The UCI President Pat McQuaid stated later that it would seek to extend Valverde's ban worldwide. On 27 March, McQuaid said that the UCI would wait to impose a worldwide ban on Valverde until CAS ruled on an appeal by the UCI, protesting the fact that the Spanish cycling federation (RFEC) did not open disciplinary proceedings against Valverde. The CAS ruled on 31 May that the suspension could be enforced, and the UCI applied a retroactive two-year suspension on Valverde from 1 January 2010. In additionto this, all of his results from 2010 were nullified.
- On 6 April 2010, Italian newspaper La Gazzetta dello Sport revealed the Mantova doping investigation, an investigation based around the town of Mariana Mantovana in Lombardy, which had been commenced by Italian police. It reported that the investigation could involve 54 people relating to events in the 2008 and 2009 seasons. The cycling coach/doctor Guido Negrelli, who had worked in the past with Lampre riders and the team manager Giuseppe Saronni allegedly was at the centre of the investigation. Lampre-Farnese Vini's team doctors and two riders, Alessandro Petacchi and Lorenzo Bernucci, had their homes searched as part of the investigation. Bernucci was suspended after police reportedly found banned products in his house. He remained suspended until his team received further information about the search. A day later, the same newspaper revealed more details of the investigation, claiming that 16 of the teams riders and staff had been placed under formal investigation for doping related offences. Amongst the names mentioned by the newspaper were current and former Lampre riders, including Francesco Gavazzi, Damiano Cunego, Alessandro Ballan, and Mauro Santambrogio. Team manager Saronni, directeur sportifs Fabrizio Bontempi and Maurizio Piovani, current coach Sergio Gelati, and former Lampre doctor Dr Andrea Andreazzoli (In 2010 at Astana Team were also named. On 9 April, BMC Racing suspended its riders Ballan and Santambrogio pending the outcome of the police investigation.
- On 22 April 2010 Swiss Rider Thomas Frei's A sample, taken during the Giro del Trentino, was found to be positive for EPO. He was suspended by his team, BMC Racing Team, pending further investigation and testing of his B sample.
- Also on 22 April 2010, the UCI announced that Team Radio Shack rider Li Fuyu had tested positive for the banned substance clenbuterol during the Dwars door Vlaanderen on March 23. He was suspended by his team pending the outcome of the B sample testing.
- On 28 April, it was announced that Gabriele Bosisio would be suspended from professional cycling for 2 years. He tested positive for EPO in an out-of-competition test in September 2009. He was provisionally suspended by the UCI on October 6, and so his ban would end on 5 October 2011.
- On 3 May, the UCI announced the names of three riders who had returned irregular blood values in their blood passport. These riders were Franco Pellizotti, Jesus Rosendo Prado and Tadej Valjavec. On 22 June, the Spanish Cycling Federation cleared Rosendo. On 30 July, Valjavec was cleared by the Slovenian anti-doping agency. On 21 October, Pellizotti was also cleared by his own national anti-doping agency. The UCI appealed the cases of Pellizotti and Valjavec to CAS and won both cases.
- One day later, on 4 May, it was announced that French rider Mickaël Larpe had tested positive for EPO, ten hours after his house was raided by police.
- On 27 May, Francesco De Bonis became the first cyclist to be banned on the evidence of his blood passport results. His 2-year suspension was set to finish in June 2011, 2 years after he was first stopped from racing. De Bonis appealed the case to CAS, but lost.
- On 3 June, it was announced that Pietro Caucchioli had been banned for 2 years on the evidence of his irregular blood passport results, found in June 2009. His ban was set to finish in June 2011.
- On 17 June, the UCI announced that Ricardo Serrano had been suspended by the Spanish cycling federation (RFEC) for two years due to CERA having been found in two separate blood samples collected around a year ago. He was also implicated due to abnormal values in his blood passport.
- On 20 June, media reports told of how Alessandro Petacchi had been notified at the start of the Tour de France that he had been placed under investigation by a prosecutor in Padova. Petacchi is accused of having used PFC (Perfluorocarbon) and human serum albumin. The accusations stem from phone taps on a doctor from Brescia.
- On 7 July, it was announced that Niklas Axelsson had been suspended for life following positive analysis of his B-sample for EPO. He had previously been suspended for EPO use in 2001.
- Three Brazilian riders were sanctioned for adverse findings during the Tour do Rio in July 2010: Jao Paulo de Oliveira (for phentermine) and two for stanazolol: Lucas Onesco and Jair Fernando dos Santos. All three received a two-year suspension and loss of results.
- On 29 July, the UK Anti-doping agency posted the 2-year suspension for cyclist Dan Staite for EPO and ATD found in sample taken at a National B level event.
- On 8 September, while he was riding the 2010 Vuelta a España, it was announced that Roy Sentjens (Team Milram) had failed an out of competition doping control and would be suspended from cycling. On September 10, Sentjens admitted to having doped with EPO that he had obtained in Barcelona, Spain, and declined to request the testing of his B-sample. He also announced his immediate retirement from professional cycling. UCI handed him a 2-year ban on 27 December 2012. He changed his mind about retirement while serving his ban, and he made a comeback in 2012 with continental team Cyclingteam de Rijke.
- On 16 September, a UCI statement was released announcing that Óscar Sevilla had tested positive for the blood expander hydroxyethyl starch after the final stage of the Vuelta a Colombia, which he had won, on 15 August. He has been provisionally suspended. On 30 September, it was announced that the Spanish Cycling Federation will let him continue racing until his B-sample is tested. On 14 September 2011, Sevilla was issued a six-month ban (14 Sept to 14 March 2012), for the anti-doping rule violation.
- On 29 September, a UCI statement was released announcing that this year's Tour de France winner, Alberto Contador, had tested positive for "a very small concentration" of the banned stimulant clenbuterol, on July 21, one of the race's rest days. He had been suspended by the UCI for two years and loses all his titles won in this time, including the Tour de France 2010.
- On 30 September, the UCI announced that Xacobeo-Galicia riders Ezequiel Mosquera and David García Dapena had both tested positive for hydroxyethyl starch on September 16, during the Vuelta a España. Mosquera had finished the race in 2nd place, and Dapena finished 11th overall. On 6 October, it was announced that Garcia Dapena had tested positive for EPO during the race, on 13 September. Mosquera was handed a 2-year ban on 16 November 2011, while Garcia got an 18-month ban on 2 December 2011.
- On 7 October, Joao Benta admitted to doping after having tested positive in July.
- On 9 October, Alessandro Colo was given a one-year ban by CONI for testing positive for clenbuterol on the last stage of the Vuelta Mexico.
- On 22 October, Ivan Stević (Toyota-United/Partizan Srbija) was handed a 2-year backdated ban for the "use or attempted use of a prohibited substance or method". His results from 17 September 2008 to 22 October 2010 were annulled and he was immediately free to compete again. Stević had originally been banned for life by the Italian anti-doping authority in September 2008 for his involvement in the Oil for Drugs case, but got the ban reduced by CAS.

=== 2011 ===
- Greg Ball (cyclist)
- On February 6, 2011 Riccardo Riccò was admitted to a hospital in critical condition after what has been diagnosed as kidney failure, allegedly due to a blood transfusion he performed on himself with 25-day-old blood. Riccò admitted he had performed the transfusion to the doctor treating him in the presence of his girlfriend Vania Rossi. The doctor treating him reported this information to authorities leading to an investigation being opened against the professional cyclist by police and the Italian Olympic committee (CONI). He was well enough to be released from hospital within two weeks, and was sacked by his team Vacansoleil–DCM.
- On 7 February, it was announced that Lorenzo Bernucci of the Lampre-ISD team had been banned from cycling for five years. After his house was raided in 2010, prohibited substances were found and he was banned for 'the use or attempted use by an athlete of a prohibited substance or method, as well as the possession of prohibited substances'. Several members of his family were also banned for either three or four years due to their involvement.
- On 1 March, it was revealed that Tour de San Luis winner Marco Arriagada had tested positive for an 'anabolic substance' during the National Tour of Chile.
- On 19 March, it was announced that Patrik Sinkewitz had tested positive for hGH at the GP di Lugano in late February. He has been provisionally suspended pending results of his B sample, and could face a lifetime ban for this second offence.
- On 3 May, CONI announced that Pasquale Muto had tested positive for EPO at the Giro dell'Appennino in April, and subsequent testing of his 'B' sample confirmed the result
- On June 11, CONI formally suspended Riccardo Riccò, for "use or attempted use of prohibited methods."
- On 1 July, USADA announced that Lisban Quintero had accepted a two-year ban after testing positive for norandrosterone at the Wilmington Grand Prix on May 22.
- On 12 July, during the 2011 Tour de France Alexandr Kolobnev was informed by the UCI of an Adverse Analytical Finding for the diuretic hydrochlorothiazide in an A sample collected on 6 July 2011. As the UCI Anti-Doping Rules do not provide for a provisional suspension given the nature of the substance Kolobnev voluntarily withdrew, with the team waiting on the B sample.
- On 12 August, David Clinger was issued a lifetime ban by the USADA, for a positive test for clenbuterol while serving a ban for a prior offense.
- On 3 September, Benito Ros Charral tested positive for Prednisolone and was eventually stripped of all results from the date of the test to 2 September 2013. He was the first trials rider to be disqualified for taking a banned substance.

=== 2012 ===
==== Sanctions after investigations ====
	Case	Banned substances/methods	Sanction	Reference
Lance Armstrong (USA)	USADA Cycling investigation	Use, possession, trafficking, administration of prohibited substances and methods and assisting, encouraging, aiding, abetting, covering up or any other type of complicity involving one or more anti-doping rule violations and/or attempted anti-doping rule violations.	Life ban + loss of results from 1 August 1998 – 2012	
Michael Barry (CAN)	USADA's U.S. Postal Service Pro Cycling Team Investigation	Cortisone, EPO, hGH, Testosterone, Tetracosactide	6 months + loss of results	
Tom Danielson (USA)	USADA's U.S. Postal Service Pro Cycling Team Investigation	Blood transfusions, Cortisone, EPO, hGH, Testosterone	6 months + loss of results	
Michele Ferrari (ITA)	USADA Cycling investigation		Life ban	
George Hincapie (USA)	USADA's U.S. Postal Service Pro Cycling Team Investigation	Blood transfusions, EPO, hGH, Testosterone	6 months + loss of results	
Levi Leipheimer (USA)	USADA's U.S. Postal Service Pro Cycling Team Investigation	Actovegin, Blood transfusions, EPO, Testosterone	6 months + loss of results	
Luis Garcia del Moral (ESP)	USADA Cycling investigation		Life ban	
Michele Scarponi (ITA)		Working with banned doctor Michele Ferrari	3 months	
Christian Vande Velde (USA)	USADA's U.S. Postal Service Pro Cycling Team Investigation	Actovegin, Cortisone, EPO, hGH, Testosterone, Tetracosactide	6 months + loss of results	
Giovanni Visconti (ITA)		Working with banned doctor Michele Ferrari	3 months	
Matt White (AUS)		EPO, hGH, Testosterone	6 months	
David Zabriskie (USA)	USADA's U.S. Postal Service Pro Cycling Team Investigation	EPO, hGH, Testosterone	6 months + loss of results	

==== Admissions of doping in the past ====
Cyclist	Banned substances/methods	Reference
Michael Barry (CAN)	Cortisone, EPO, hGH, Testosterone, Tetracosactide	
Tom Danielson (USA)	Blood transfusions, Cortisone, EPO, hGH, Testosterone	
Graziano Gasparre (ITA)	Amphetamine, Cocaine, EPO, hGH, Testosterone	
George Hincapie (USA)	Blood transfusions, EPO, hGH, Testosterone	
Stephen Hodge (AUS)	Cortisone, EPO	
Steven de Jongh (NED)	EPO	
Bobby Julich (USA)	EPO	
Steffen Kjærgaard (NOR)	EPO, Cortisone	
Levi Leipheimer (USA)	Actovegin, Blood transfusions, EPO, Testosterone	
Jan Ullrich (GER)	Admitted to dealings with Dr. Eufemiano Fuentes	
Christian Vande Velde (USA)	Actovegin, Cortisone, EPO, hGH, Testosterone, Tetracosactide	
Jonathan Vaughters (USA)	Actovegin, Cortisone, EPO	
Martin Vinnicombe (AUS)		
Matt White (AUS)	EPO, hGH, Testosterone	
David Zabriskie (USA)	EPO, hGH, Testosterone	

==== Positive doping tests ====
Date	Cyclist	Event	Race	Banned substance	Sanction	Reference
21 February	Wendy Cruz (DOM)	Road		EPO	2 years	
21 February	Alexander Serebryakov (RUS)	Road	Out of competition test (retested in 2013)	EPO	4 years (second violation)	
21 February	Pablo Pintos (URU)			EPO	2 years	
24 February	Marco Degaldo (DOM)			Boldenone	2 years	
25 February	Matías Médici (ARG)	Road	Rutas de América	EPO	2 years	
4 March	Jaco Rheeder (RSA)	MTB (Amateur)	Argus Mountain Bike Race	Methamphetamine	2 years	
22 March	Denis Galimzyanov (RUS)	Road	Out of competition test	EPO	2 years	
1 April	Shelby Stacy (USA)	BMX	US BMX National Championships	Methylhexaneamine	6 months	
5 April	Fernando Augusto Mendez Garcia (URU)			Exogenous Steroid	2 years	
10 April	Steven Wong (HKG)	Road	Out of competition test	Exogenous Steroids	2 years	
15 April	Julio Cruz (USA) (Age 43)	Road (Masters)	Parkland Circuit - BBPA	Methylhexaneamine	6 months	
15 April	Alexey Lomilov (RUS)	MTB		Fenoterol	3 months	
24 April	Ivaïlo Gabrovski (BUL)	Road	Tour of Turkey	EPO	2 years	
1 May	Jonas Elmiger (SUI)	Road	Rund um den Finanzplatz	Failed to submit to sample collection	16 months	
6 May	Blaž Furdi (SLO)	Road	Großer Preis Sportland Niederösterreich Poysdorf	Amphetamine	2 years	
19 May	Andries van Straaten (RSA)	Road (Amateur)		Methylhexaneamine	6 months	
20 May	David Anthony (USA) (Age 45)	Road (Amateur)	Gran Fondo New York	EPO	2 years	
20 May	Gabriele Guarini (ITA) (Age 49)	Road (Amateur)	Gran Fondo New York	EPO	2 years	
24 May	Volodymyr Bileka (UKR)	Road	Tour of Trakya	Norpseudoephedrine	4 years (second violation)	
26 May	Monica Bascio (USA)	Para-cycling	UCI Para-cycling Road World Cup in Rome	Tuaminoheptane	3 months	
30 May	Matti Helminen (FIN)	Road	Tour de Luxembourg	Probenecid	2 years	
10 June	Greg Cavanagh (CAN)	Road (Amateur)	KW Classic Road Race	Testosterone	2 years	
11 June	Stefano Di Carlo (ITA)	Road		Stanozolol	2 years	
12 June	Rasa Leleivytė (LIT)	Road	Out of competition test	EPO	2 years	
14 July	Fränk Schleck (LUX)	Road	Tour de France	Xipamide	1 year	
24 July	Viktoria Baranova (RUS)	Track	2012 Summer Olympics	Testosterone	2 years	
8 August	José Belda (ESP)	Road	Vuelta Ciclista a León	Methylphenidate	2 years	
11 August	Sylwester Janiszewski (POL)	Road	Memorial Henryk Lasak	Androstatrienedione	2 years	
25 August	Mariano Giallorenzo (ITA)	Road	Coppa Placci	Norpseudoephedrine	1 year	
29 August	David George (RSA)	MTB		EPO	2 year	
11 September	Yovcho Yovchev (BUL)	Road	Tour of Bulgaria	Amphetamine	4 years	
21 September	Steve Houanard (FRA)	Road	Out of competition test	EPO	2 years	
30 September	Erick Irmisch (GER)	MTB	IXSGerman Downhill Cup	Cocaine	1 year	
30 September	Cyril Jay-Rayon (USA)	MTB	USA Cycling Mountain Bike 24-Hour National Championships	Modafinil	18 months	
7 October	Pavol Polievka (SVK)	Road	Grand Prix Chantal Biya	Stanozolol, T/E Ratio˃4, 19-Norandrosterone	4 years	
21 October + 18 November	Tatsiana Sharakova (BLR)	Track	UEC European Track Championships	Tuaminoheptane	18 months	
23 December	Alan Jose Morales Castillo (CRC)	Road	Vuelta Ciclista a Costa Rica	GW501516	2 years	
23 October	Becaye Traore (SEN)	Road	Tour du Faso	Niketamide	2 years	
20 December	Marco Salas (CRC)	Road	Vuelta Ciclista a Costa Rica	Clostebol	1 year	
25 December	Pablo Muddara (CRC)	Road	Vuelta Ciclista a Costa Rica	GW501516	2 years	
27 & 29 December	Steven Villalobos Azofeifa (CRC)	Road	Vuelta Ciclista a Costa Rica	GW501516	2 years	
28 December	Paulo Vargas Barrantes (CRC)	Road	Vuelta Ciclista a Costa Rica	GW501516	12 years	

==== Doping cases ====
- On 19 January, amateur French rider Alexandre Dougnier (Athletic Club de Boulogne-Billancourt) was banned for three years by the FFC after a urine sample taking in May 2011 tested positive for twelve prohibited substances, thought to be a record number in an individual case.
- On 6 February the Court of Arbitration for Sport handed Alberto Contador a two-year sanction for his positive test for clenbuterol at the 2010 Tour de France. The ban means Contador will lose race results dating back to and including the 2010 Tour de France. The ban ended on August 5, 2012, allowing him to ride in the 2012 Vuelta a España. Contador won, his first race on this return.
- On 16 April, it was announced that Denis Galimzyanov of Team Katusha had been provisionally suspended after he tested positive for EPO in an out-of-competition test on March 22. He subsequently admitted the charge and waived the B sample testing. In December, it was announced that Galimzyanov was suspended for two years, starting retroactively on 13 April 2012.
- On 30 May, Matti Helminen tested positive for Probenecid at the Tour de Luxembourg, He received a two-year suspension.
- On 13 June, the USADA sent a letter to cyclist Lance Armstrong, team leader Johan Bruyneel, doctor Michele Ferrari, team doctors Pedro Celaya and Luis Garcia del Moral, and trainer Jose Pepe Martí) charging them with conspiring in doping between 1998 and 2011.
- On 10 July, police raided Cofidis hotel and took Remy di Gregorio into custody, effectively withdrawing him from the Tour de France he was competing in at the time. This is related to a doping affair which happened in 2011 when di Gregorio was riding for Astana. In April 2013, with the investigation still ongoing, Di Gregorio was cleared to race again.
- On 10 July, the USADA issued lifetime bans for Michele Ferrari, Luis Garcia del Moral, and Jose Pepe Marti in relation to the doping conspiracy charges. Jose Pepe Marti later opted to have his case taken in arbitration, and the USADA agreed to the request, suspending his lifetime ban.
- On 17 July, Fränk Schleck was removed from the Tour de France by his team RadioShack-Nissan during the second rest day after his A-sample returned traces of Xipamide. Schleck's B-sample confirmed the positive result, and Schleck claims he was poisoned. In January 2013, it was announced that Schleck was handed a ban of one year by the Luxembourg Anti-Doping Agency, who specified that it was a "verdict of accidental contamination" and the traces of Xipamide were very low. The ban has been retrospectively applied, so Schleck will be able to compete again after 14 July 2013.
- On 18 July, it was announced that Bulgarian Ivailo Gabrovski had tested positive for EPO with his A sample after winning the third stage of the Presidential Cycling Tour of Turkey in Elmalı. He subsequently won the Tour, but could face a ban and the loss of his title if the B sample is positive. On 14 September, the news reported that the B sample turned out positive too, and the UCI was awaiting official sanctions from the Bulgarian Federation to cancel Gabrovski's win.
- On 18 July, information was released to the press stating that Lithuanian female rider Rasa Leleivytė had failed a doping test on June 12 of the same year and that her A sample was consistent with the use of EPO.
- On 23 August, Lance Armstrong declined to proceed to arbitration and contest the charges of systematic doping levied against him by the United States Anti-Doping Agency. Thus, Armstrong was deemed guilty of doping and banned for life, and USADA disqualified his results from 1 August 1998.
- On 29 August, mountainbiker and former road cyclist David George tested positive for EPO. He received a two-year suspension.
- On 29 August, it was announced that 47-year-old Soren Svenningsen had tested positive for three banned substances in an amateur race on June 30 of the same year. Svenningsen was a board member of the Danish Cycling Union and of the Clearidium anti-doping agency. He resigned from the Cycling Union.
- On 7 September, UCI president Pat McQuaid said the UCI has asked the USADA to provide the UCI with the files of Tom Danielson, Christian Vande Velde and David Zabriskie after their team manager, Jonathan Vaughters, suggested that the three had doped in the past.
- On 9 October, it was announced that Steve Houanard failed an off-competition doping test performed on 21 September 2012. His A-sample was consistent with the use of EPO and he was provisionally suspended by the UCI. Houanard accepted a 2-year ban on 18 January 2013.
- On 10 October, USADA announced that Levi Leipheimer, Christian Vande Velde, David Zabriskie, Tom Danielson, Michael Barry and George Hincapie had admitted to doping at U.S. Postal Service Pro Cycling Team and that they were suspended for six months. Hincapie and Barry had retired earlier in the season while Team Omega Pharma-Quickstep terminated Leipheimers contract a week later, and he eventually had to retire from pro cycling as he could not get a new contract. Zabriskie, Danielson and Vande Velde came back after the suspensions, but two of them retired after the 2013 season, with only Danielson still riding pr. 2014.
- On 10 October USADA published its Reasoned Decision with appendices and supporting material of their investigation into doping at the US Postal and Discovery teams, a 1000+ pages long document. The document was made public for everyone to read at USADA's website, with only some names redacted from affidavits.
- On 12 October, the Radioshack-Nissan-Trek team sacked general manager Johan Bruyneel as a consequence of the USADA doping investigation and the revelations of the USADA reasoned decision documents.
- On 13 October, as a consequence of the USADA doping investigation, Matt White admits to doping while at US Postal. He steps down from his job in the management of Pro Tour team Orica-GreenEDGE and as selector for the Australian national team.
- On 17 October, as a consequence of the USADA doping investigation and the revelations of the USADA reasoned decision documents, Team Sky announces that riders and staff will have to sign an anti-doping declaration confirming that they have no past or present involvement in doping, a zero tolerance policy to doping. Anyone not signing will have to leave the team.
- On 18 October, Stephen Hodge admits to doping in the past and steps down from his role as vice president of Cycling Australia.
- On 19 October, Rabobank announced that they would end their sponsorship of the professional men's and women's teams as a consequence of the USADA doping investigation and the revelations of the USADA reasoned decision documents. They later changed their mind about the women's team.
- On 22 October, UCI ratifies USADA's ban of Lance Armstrong. At the press conference, UCI president Pat McQuaid said that "Lance Armstong has no place in cycling." McQuaid also called whistleblowers Floyd Landis and Tyler Hamilton "scumbags."
- On 23 October, as a consequence of the USADA doping investigation, Steffen Kjærgaard admitted to doping in the past. The substances he used were EPO, cortisone, and other illegal drugs. Kjærgaard had been the director for the Norwegian Cycling Federation for several years after his retirement from cycling, and was immediately removed from the position.
- On 25 October, Bobby Julich, in the wake of USADAS Reasoned Decision and as a result of Skys zero tolerance policy, admits to doping in the past and leaves his job as race coach at Team Sky.
- On 26 October, the UCI Management Committee announced its decision to not reallocate the Tour victories or any other of Armstrongs results in the period between 1998 and 2005. The ruling extended "from now on to any competitive sporting results disqualified due to doping for the period from 1998 to 2005, without prejudice to the statute of limitation."
- On 28 October, it becomes known that sports directors Sean Yates and Steven de Jongh are leaving Team Sky.
- On 29 October, Steven de Jongh admits to doping in the past and Team Sky confirms that he is leaving the team.
- On 2 November, WADA announces that it is not going to appeal USADAs decision on Lance Armstrong.
- On 20 November, CONI asks for 3-month suspensions for Michele Scarponi and Giovanni Visconti for having worked with banned doctor Michele Ferrari.
- On 30 November, Martin Vinnicombe admits to doping in the past.

=== 2013 ===
==== Admissions of doping in the past ====
Cyclist	Banned substances/methods	Reference
Lance Armstrong (USA)	Blood transfusions, Cortisone, EPO, hGH, Testosterone	
Michael Boogerd (NED)	Blood transfusions, Cortisone, EPO	
Eddy Bouwmans (NED)	Cortisone, EPO, Testosterone	
Thomas Dekker (NED)	Blood transfusions, EPO	
Jacky Durand (FRA)	EPO	
Ryder Hesjedal (CAN)	EPO	
Rudi Kemna (NED)	EPO	
Marc Lotz (NED)	Cortisone, EPO	
Danny Nelissen (NED)	EPO	
Stuart O'Grady (AUS)	EPO	
Michael Rasmussen (DEN)	Blood transfusions, Cortisone, DHEA, EPO, hGH, IGF-1, Insulin, Testosterone	
Rolf Sørensen (DEN)	Cortisone, EPO	

==== Doping cases ====
- On 15 January, the Dutch Cycling Federation and UCI WorldTour teams Blanco Pro Cycling and Vacansoleil-DCM announced that they no longer would hire any rider or staff member who had served more than a six-month doping ban.
- On 15 January, WADA and USADA said they would not be participating in UCI's Independent Commission. They voiced concerns about lack of impartiality and the commission's lack of power to grant amnesty.
- On 17 January, IOC stripped Lance Armstrong of the 2000 Olympic time trial bronze medal.
- On 19 January, Thomas Dekker confessed to blood doping while riding for Rabobank, and said that "Doping was a way of life at Rabobank".
- On 22 January, UCI announced that Leif Hoste was under investigation over abnormalities in his Biological passport.
- On 31 January, Michael Rasmussen held a press conference where he admitted the use of doping for much of his pro career. He stated that he had used EPO, growth hormone, testosterone, DHEA, insulin, IGF-1, cortisone and did blood transfusions.
- On 6 March, Michael Boogerd held a press conference for Dutch news broadcaster NOS where he admitted to have used doping at the peak of his career (from 1997 until 2007). He stated that he had used EPO, cortisone and was subject of blood transfusions.
- On 8 March, Jason Rogers tested positive for Methylhexaneamine. He received a nine-month sanction.
- On 10 March, Yosmani Pol Rodriguez tested positive for Dexamethasone. He received a two-year sanction.
- On 18 March, Rolf Sørensen admitted using EPO and Cortisone during the 1990s.
- On 15 May, it was announced that Miguel Ubeto (Lampre–Merida) had tested positive for GW-501516 in an out-of-competition control 16 April. Ubeto had been recommended the drug by a doctor in Venezuela after surgery. The Venezuelan federation handed Ubeto a two-year ban from sport, which was later cut to 14 months.
- On 15 May, Sylvain Georges tested positive for heptaminol.
- On 29 May, it was announced that Danilo Di Luca of Vini Fantini–Selle Italia was positive on a doping test for EPO, forcing him out of the Giro d'Italia. It was confirmed on 5 December 2013 that he would be banned for life and he received a fine of 35,000 euros on top of it.
- On 3 June, Mauro Santambrogio of Vini Fantini–Selle Italia was positive on a doping test to EPO. Santambrogio was suspended by the UCI until 2 November 2014.
- On 8 June, Yoelkis Aira (age 41) tested positive for Phentermine. He received a two-year sanction.
- On 15 July, it was announced that 2013 Tour of Turkey winner Mustafa Sayar (Torku Şekerspor) was provisionally suspended following the news that he tested positive for EPO during the Tour d'Algérie in March.
- On 21 July, Cesar Marte tested positive for Modafinil. He received a two-year sanction.
- On 24 July, a French Senatorial commission released a list containing the names of cyclists who, in a retroactive analysis, tested positive for EPO while competing in the 1998 Tour de France which includes: Manuel Beltrán, Jeroen Blijlevens, Mario Cipollini, Laurent Desbiens, Jacky Durand, Bo Hamburger, Jens Heppner, Laurent Jalabert, Kevin Livingston, Eddy Mazzoleni, Nicola Minali, Abraham Olano, Marco Pantani, Fabio Sacchi, Marcos Serrano, Andrea Tafi, Jan Ullrich, and Erik Zabel. The same list also contained the names of cyclists who produced suspicious test results which includes: Stephane Barthe, Ermanno Brignoli, Giuseppe Calcaterra, Pascal Chanteur, Bobby Julich, Eddy Mazzoleni, Roland Meier, Axel Merckx, Frederic Moncassin, Stuart O'Grady, Alain Turicchia, and Stefano Zanini. Hamburger and Livingston were again named for producing positive results for doping tests during the 1999 Tour de France.
- On 24 July Stuart O'Grady, as a reaction to the French Senatorial commission report released the same day, admitted to have used EPO. He'd retired from cycling two days previously, after having signed a one-year contract with Orica-GreenEDGE in June.
- On 24 July Jacky Durand, as a reaction to the French Senatorial commission report released the same day, admitted to have used EPO.
- On 5 September, Todd Robertson (age 51) tested positive for Modafinil. This was his second doping offence and he received an eight-year suspension.
- On 6 September, David LeDuc (age 62) tested positive for a steroid of exogenous origin, recombinant human erythropoietin ("rhEPO") and amphetamine. He received a two-year suspension.
- On 29 September, Daniel Baker tested positive for an exogenous anabolic-androgenic steroid. He received a two-year sanction.
- On 31 October, Ryder Hesjedal publicly admitted to having used EPO during his mountain bike career after being outed by Michael Rasmussen. No sanctions were ordered against him.

=== 2014 ===
- On 17 January, Alessandro Ballan was banned for two years by CONI for a blood transfusion received in 2009. Late 2015, his suspension was overturned in court, and Ballan was cleared of any wrongdoing.
- On 6 February, Daryl Impey tested positive for probenecid at the South African Cycling Championships. He was later cleared as it was determined the positive test was due to a contaminated medication.
- On 24 February, Patrik Sinkewitz lost the case in the Court of Arbitration for Sport over his 2011 HGH positive and got an eight-year suspension. It was his second doping suspension, the first came as a result of testing positive for testosterone in 2007.
- On 4 May, Logan Loader tested positive for Methylhexaneamine. He received an eight-month suspension.
- On 30 May, Paolo Savoldelli received a six-month suspension for having worked with banned doctor Michele Ferrari in the past. Savoldelli had been retired from cycling since 2008.
- On 28 June, Roman Kreuziger revealed that there was an ongoing investigation into anomalous values from 2011 and 2012 in his biological passport. On 22 September, it was announced that his national federation cleared him of any anti-doping violation and that he was free to compete again. The ruling has been appealed to the CAS by WADA and UCI. The case was dropped by both agencies on 5 June 2015.
- On 10 July, Bart Voskamp admitted that he'd been doping and that part of the EPO that were seized by French customs from a TVM team car in 1998 was his.
- In July, Jonathan Tiernan-Locke, Carlos Barredo and Denis Menchov received two-year sanctions as a result of anomalies detected in their biological passports. Barredo and Menchov had already retired from the sport while Tiernan-Locke's contract with Team Sky was immediately terminated. Menchov was stripped of his 2009, 2010 and 2012 Tour de France results, Tiernan-Locke was stripped for the 2012 Tour of Britain victory and his result from the 2012 UCI Road World Championships, while Barredo lost all his results from 26 October 2007 to 24 September 2011.
- On 15 July, it was reported that double London Olympics bronze medalist Olga Zabelinskaya had tested positive for octopamine at a race in the spring. The case was still not closed mid September 2015.
- On 10 September, it was announced that Valentin Iglinsky had tested positive for EPO at the Eneco Tour. He was immediately fired by the Astana management, who said Iglinsky acted independently of the team.
- On 12 September, it was announced that Matteo Rabottini was suspended by the UCI following an adverse analytical finding for EPO in a test taken in August 2014.
- On 1 October, Maxim Iglinsky (brother of Valentin Iglinsky and riding for the same team, Astana) was provisionally suspended after testing positive for EPO in August 2014.
- On 30 October, current Brazilian National Time Trial champion, Márcia Fernandes, was suspended for two years for returning a positive doping test for EPO by the Brazilian cycling federation.
- On 18 December, it was announced by UCI that Mauro Santambrogio had tested positive for testosterone on 22 October, while he was still serving his reduced ban for an EPO positive at the 2013 Giro d'Italia.

=== 2015 ===
- On 19 January, it was announced that Lampre rider Diego Ulissi was banned for nine months after the Salbutamol positive from the 2014 Giro d'Italia. The ban was backdated and ended on March 28.
- On 22 January, it was announced that former Rabobank and Team Sky doctor Geert Leinders was banned for life by USADA, Anti-Doping Denmark and Anti-Doping Authority Netherlands. Former Rabobank riders Michael Rasmussen and Levi Leipheimer testified at the hearing. Information from the hearing lead to UCI Doctor and Scientific Advisor Dr. Mario Zorzoli being suspended by UCI.
- On 10 March, UCI announced that Lloyd Mondory (Ag2r-La Mondiale) had tested positive for EPO in an out-of-competition control on 17 February 2015.
- On 23 April, it was announced that Hichem Chaabane had tested positive for two undisclosed prohibited substances and was provisionally suspended from racing.
- On 9 June, it was announced that Petr Ignatenko of Rusvelo had tested positive to human growth hormone on 8 April 2015. He was fired by his team.
- On 9 June, the UCI confirmed that Ramon Carretero of Southeast Pro Cycling had tested positive for EPO on 22 April, before the Tour of Turkey.
- On 30 June, it was announced that Davide Appollonio of Androni Giocattoli–Sidermec gave an adverse analytical finding for EPO, on June 14 – two weeks after completing the Giro d'Italia, and was provisionally suspended.
- On 22 June, former pro rider Nicki Sørensen publicly admitted to doping in the past.
- On 23 June, Anti-doping Danmark published their report on doping in Danish cycling between 1998 and 2015. The report said that CSC team leaders and staff Bjarne Riis, Johnny Weltz, Alex Pedersen, and a number of Danish former riders, of whom only Nicki Sørensen and Frank Høj were named, had all violated applicable anti-doping rules, but that the statute of limitations (8 years) prevented ADD from opening doping cases against them.
- On 24 June, former pro rider Bjarke Schmidt Nielsen admitted to prohibited use of cortisone in the past.
- On 8 July, it was disclosed that Vegard Robinson Bugge (Team Sparebanken Sør) had tested positive for terbutaline and was provisionally suspended by his team. He was handed a four-month ban in October, lasting from 29 June to 28 October 2015.
- On 10 July, it was disclosed that in the 2015 Tour de France, Luca Paolini (Team Katusha) tested positive for cocaine. He was thrown out of the race after stage 7.
- On 15 July, it was announced that Francesco Reda (Team Idea 2010 ASD) had tested positive to EPO after the Italian National Road Race Championships, which he finished second.
- On 16 July, UCI announced that Alexandre Pliușchin had been banned for 9 months for a Salbutamol positive from November 2014, when he was riding for Skydive Dubai Pro Cycling.
- On 19 July, former pro rider Frank Høj admitted to doping in the past.
- On 20 July, it was announced by the Chilean Olympic Committee that Carlos Oyarzun had been sent home from the 2015 Pan American Games in Toronto after he'd tested positive for the HIF prolyl-hydroxylase inhibitor FG-4592. In August 2016 UCI disclosed that Oyarzun had been handed a four-year ban.
- On 22 July, it was disclosed that Colombian track rider María Luisa Calle had tested positive for GHRP2 at the 2015 Pan American Games.
- On 27 July, it was announced that Fabio Taborre (Androni Giocattoli–Sidermec) had tested positive for the HIF prolyl-hydroxylase inhibitor FG-4592 on 16 June, and that Taborre was provisionally suspended. His team Androni Giocattoli-Sidermec was also facing sanction from UCI, as this was the second anti-doping rule violation in less than a year for riders from the team. Davide Appollonio had tested positive for EPO in a control only two days prior to Taborre's positive test. The team would also have to auto suspend itself from competition for four weeks in accordance with MPCC rules, as it was their 3rd positive in less than two years. (Patrick Facchini tested positive for tuaminoheptane in 2014).
- On 28 July, UCI announced that Mónica Calderon of Colombia had tested positive for clostebol metabolites at Vuelta Ciclista Femenina a Costa Rica on 13 June.
- On 29 July, UCI announced that their Disciplinary Commission had suspended Androni Giocattoli–Sidermec for 30 days, starting 1 August, for two doping rule violations committed by the team's riders within 12 months. Davide Appollonio and Fabio Taborre had both tested positive mid June, and new UCI rules 1 January 2015 introduced Team Suspension provisions in cases of multiple doping rule violations on a team. Androni Giocattoli–Sidermec was the first team to be sanctioned under this rule.
- On 3 August, Tom Danielson (Cannondale–Garmin) disclosed that he'd been notified by the USADA that he had tested positive for synthetic testosterone in a sample collected out-of-competition 9 July.
- On 18 August, it was announced that Giampaolo Caruso was provisionally suspended for an EPO positive after a sample from March 2012 had been re-tested by UCI.
- On 24 August, it was announced that Hichem Chaabane had been handed a 4-year ban from sports for testing positive for EPO and methylprednisolone on 24 and 28 March, during the Tour d'Algérie.
- On 6 September, Clara Hughes revealed that she had served a 3-month "silent ban" after an ephedrine positive at the 1994 UCI Road World Championships. Neither UCI nor Cycling Canada had announced the doping case at the time, and UCI has never published any information about Hughes being disqualified from the 1994 World Championships.
- On 18 September, UCI revealed that Alexey Shmidt (Russia) was provisionally suspended for an EPO positive in sample collected in November 2011. Shmidt rode for the professional continental team Team Type 1-Sanofi in 2011, and was a DS for the Team Novo Nordisk development team at the time of the announcement of the positive.
- On 18 September, UCI revealed that mountain biker Blaža Klemenčič (Slovenia) was provisionally suspended for an EPO positive in sample collected in March 2012. Blaža Klemenčič rode for the Felt-Ötztal-X-Bionic Team in 2012. She was subsequently handed a two-year ban and her results from 27 March 2012 to 31 December 2012 were annulled.
- On 18 September, the Czech Cycling Federation announced that 22 year old track cyclist Ondrej Rybin (Czech Republic) had been handed a 4-year ban from sports after he'd tested positive for EPO in an out-of-competition control in June. Rybin had won bronze in the scratch race at the 2015 European Track Championships (under-23 & junior) in July, a race he was set to be disqualified from after the positive from June was revealed.
- On 19 September, it was announced that British cyclist Dan Stevens had been banned for 21 months after refusing to submit to an out-of-competition doping control on 29 January 2014. He'd received a 3-month cut of the sanction for providing valuable information to the Cycling Independent Reform Commission in 2014.
- On 28 September, UCI announced that José Roberto Rojas Romero of Venezuela was banned for two years for a formestane positive from 10 July 2014, that Adrian Alvarado Teneb of Chile was banned for two years for an EPO positive from 1 May 2014, and that Karl Murray of New Zealand was banned two years for a nandrolone and testosterone positive from 22 October 2013.
- On 11 December Naser Rezavi (Pishgaman–Giant Team) tested positive for anabolic steroids.

=== 2016 ===
- Almost six years since the first allegations of "mechanical doping" in cycling the UCI, during the Women's under-23 race, for the first time in cycling history found evidence of technological fraud when they checked the bicycle of Femke Van den Driessche. The UCI had been testing a new detection system. The offence carries a minimum six-month suspension and a fine of between 20,000 and 200,000 Swiss francs.
- On 5 February, it was announced that Eduard Vorganov was suspended for a positive test to meldonium.
- On the 12 March, British road cyclist Simon Yates tested positive for terbutaline at an in-competition following the sixth stage of Paris Nice. His team was notified on April 22.
- On 12 April, it was announced that Mattia Gavazzi had been provisionally suspended by the UCI for a cocaine positive taken at the Tour of Qinghai Lake in 2015. It was his third positive test to this substance during his career.
- On May 8 Russian mountain biker Ekateryna Anoshina tested positive for pseudoephedrine and cathine at the 2016 European Mountainbike Championships. She was subsequently banned for 10 months.
- It was announced on 25 May 2016 that Fabio Taborre would be suspended for 4 years for an EPO positive test.
- On 3 June Russian track cyclist Ekaterina Gnidenko tested positive for anabolic androgenic steroids from a sample taken in 2012 at the 2012 Olympic Games.
- On 4 July, news broke that Tatiana Antoshina had tested positive for GHRP-2 in a sample taken on 31 May. Antoshina had been fired by her team (Astana Women's Team) one week before.
- On 31 July, Kleber Ramos tested positive for CERA.
- On 10 August, masters cyclist Gea Johnson tested positive for modafinil and was subsequently banned for 21 months.
- On 2 September, the Australian Sports Anti-Doping Authority (ASADA) made the announcement that para-cyclist Michael Gallagher had returned a positive A sample for EPO.

=== 2017 ===
- On February 10, 2017, the UCI announced that Rahim Emami (Pishgaman Cycling Team) had tested positive for an Anabolic Androgenic Steroid during the 2016 Jelajah Malaysia and was provisionally suspended. As teammate Naser Rezavi also tested positive in the Jelajah Malaysia in December 2015, the UCI considers this a second Adverse Analytical Finding in a 12-month period with the team potentially facing a ban of between 15 and 45 days. Emami was handed a seven-year and six-month ban, expiring on May 24, 2024, when Emami will be 42, therefore the ban will effectively end his professional career.
- On 2 February, Lionel Flores tested positive for Phentermine, Mephentermine and anabolic androgenic steroids and was banned for 4 years.
- On 4 February, Josué Huidobro Grau (GSport–Valencia Sports–Wolfbike) tested positive for anabolic androgenic steroids and was banned for 4 years.
- On 26 February, Ebrahim Hajizadehasl tested positive for anabolic androgenic steroids at the 2017 Asian Cycling Championships and was banned for 4 years.
- On 2 March, Eugen Wacker (Massi–Kuwait Cycling Project) tested positive for Meldonium and was banned for 15 months.
- On 6 April, Jose Gonzales tested positive for Clenbuterol at the 2017 Junior Panamerican Cycling Championships and was banned for 1 year.
- On 7 April, Ali Hassan Mansoor (VIB Bikes) tested positive for Clenbuterol at the 2017 Tour du Maroc, and was banned for 4 years.
- On 7 April, Kirill Pozdnyakov (Synergy Baku Cycling Project) tested positive for Methylphenidate at the 2017 Tour du Maroc, and was banned for 8 months.
- On 8 April, Matias Andres Perez tested positive for Testosterone at the Vuelta del Uruguay, and was subsequently banned for 18 months.
- On 12 April, Sixto Núñez tested positive for GW 1516 at the 2017 Rutas de America and was banned for 3 years.
- On 13 April, Roberto Salvo tested positive for anabolic androgenic steroids at the 2017 Vuelta del Uruguay, and was banned for 4 years.
- On 15 April, Jonathan Barboza tested positive for Ephedrine and anabolic androgenic steroids at the 2017 Vuelta del Uruguay, and was banned for 4 years.
- On 25 April Nicola Ruffoni (Bardiani–CSF) tested positive for GHRPs and was banned for 4 years.
- On 26 April, Stefano Pirazzi (Bardiani–CSF) tested positive for GHRPs and was banned for 4 years.
- On 14 May, Jérôme Pulidori tested positive for EPO.
- On 26 and 28 May, Matija Kvasina (Felbermayr–Simplon Wels)tested positive for Molidustat.
- On 3 June, Oldemar Vega Murillo tested positive for Clenbuterol at the Copa America and UCI Junior Series XCO, and was banned for 1 year.
- On 18 June André Cardoso (Trek–Segafredo) tested positive for EPO.
- On 26 June Michael Bresciani (Bardiani–CSF) tested positive for Furosemide and was banned for 2 months.
- On 29 July, Antonio Santoro (Monkey Town Continental Team) tested positive for Acetazolamide at the 2017 Tour of Qinghai Lake and was banned for 6 months.
- On 1 August Juan Murillo (Gwada Bikers 118 team) tested positive for EPO-CERA during the Tour Cycliste International de la Guadeloupe and was later banned for four years and fined €10000.
- On 9 August Samuel Sanchez (BMC Racing Team) tested positive for GHRPs.
- On 11 August, Juan Carlos tested positive for anabolic androgenic steroids.
- On 8 October, Clayton Shepard tested positive for anabolic androgenic steroids.
- On 21 November, Róbinson López (Loteria de Boyaca), current U23 Colombian champion, tested positive at the 2017 Vuelta a Colombia for the third generation blood booster - CERA.
- On 28 November, Luis Alberto Largo (Sogamoso–Argos–Cooservicios–Idrs) tested positive for CERA at the 2017 Vuelta a Colombia.
- On 28 November, Edward Díaz (EPM) tested positive for CERA at the 2017 Vuelta a Colombia.
- On 28 November, Jonathan Felipe Paredes (Ebsa–Indeportes Boyaca) tested positive for CERA at the 2017 Vuelta a Colombia.
- On 28 November, Fabio Nelson Montenegro (Ebsa–Indeportes Boyaca) tested positive for CERA at the 2017 Vuelta a Colombia.
- On 28 November, Luis Camargo Flechas (Supergiros) tested positive for CERA at the 2017 Vuelta a Colombia.
- On 28 November, Oscar Soliz (Movistar Amateur Team) tested positive for CERA at the 2017 Vuelta a Colombia.
- On 28 November, Juan Carlos Cadena (Depormundo–Bosa–Ramguiflex) tested positive for 19-noretiocholanolone and 19-norandrosterone in a control test taken on August 11.
- On 21 December, Pierpaolo De Negri (Nippo–Vini Fantini) tested positive for anabolic androgenic steroids.

=== 2018 ===
- On 21 January Argentinian cyclist Gonzalo Najar tested positive for CERA at the Vuelta a San Juan and was banned for four years.
- On 24 January Argentinian cyclist Ezequiel Falon tested positive for anabolic androgenic steroids at the Vuelta a San Juan and was banned for four years.
- On 31 January Costa Rican cyclist Juan Carlos Rojas (Frijoles Los Tierniticos) was suspended by the UCI after testing positive for the third generation blood boost, EPO-CERA, at the 2017 Vuelta Ciclista a Costa Rica. Rojas won the overall classification in the race.
- On 31 January Costa Rican cyclist Cesar Rojas Villalegas was suspended by the UCI after testing positive for the third generation blood boost, EPO-CERA, at the 2017 Vuelta Ciclista a Costa Rica. Villalegas came third in the general classification of the race.
- On 31 January Costa Rican cyclist Leandro Varela was suspended by the UCI after testing positive for the third generation blood boost, EPO-CERA, at the 2017 Vuelta Ciclista a Costa Rica.
- On 31 January Costa Rican cyclist Vladimir Fernandez was suspended by the UCI after testing positive for the third generation blood boost, EPO-CERA, at the 2017 Vuelta Ciclista a Costa Rica. Fernandez won stage 4 of the race.
- On 31 January Costa Rican cyclist Jose Villalobos was suspended by the UCI after testing positive for the third generation blood boost, EPO-CERA, at the 2017 Vuelta Ciclista a Costa Rica.
- On 31 January Costa Rican cyclist Jason Huertas was suspended by the UCI after testing positive for the third generation blood boost, EPO-CERA, at the 2017 Vuelta Ciclista a Costa Rica.
- On 31 January Costa Rican cyclist Jose Irias was suspended by the UCI after testing positive for the third generation blood boost, EPO-CERA, at the 2017 Vuelta Ciclista a Costa Rica.
- On 31 January Costa Rican cyclist Gabriel Marin was suspended by the UCI after testing positive for the third generation blood boost, EPO-CERA, at the 2017 Vuelta Ciclista a Costa Rica.
- On 31 January Costa Rican cyclist Melvin Mora Garita was suspended by the UCI after testing positive for the third generation blood boost, EPO-CERA, at the 2017 Vuelta Ciclista a Costa Rica.
- On 31 January Costa Rican cyclist Kevin Murillo Solano was suspended by the UCI after testing positive for the third generation blood boost, EPO-CERA, at the 2017 Vuelta Ciclista a Costa Rica.
- On 31 January Costa Rican cyclist Jordy Sandoval was suspended by the UCI after testing positive for the third generation blood boost, EPO-CERA, at the 2017 Vuelta Ciclista a Costa Rica.
- On 18 February Iranian cyclist Fatemeh Hadavand tested positive for anabolic androgenic steroids.
- On 22 February Iranian cyclist Maedeh Nazari tested positive for anabolic androgenic steroids.
- On 1 March Uruguayan cyclist Ignacio Maldonado tested positive for CERA at the 2018 edition of the Vuelta a San Juan, in a sample taken on 21 January - whilst riding for the Uruguay national team.
- On 25 March Italian cyclist Andrea Villanti tested positive for Meldonium at the Criterium de Monaco and was banned for four years.
- On 31 March Brazilian cyclist Caio Godoy tested positive for cocaine at the Vuelta Ciclista del Uruguay and was banned for four years.
- On 11 April, news broke that French cyclist Rémy Di Gregorio (Delko–Marseille Provence KTM) had failed an in-competition doping test for darbepoetin (EPO) on March 8, during the 2018 edition of Paris–Nice.
- On 18 April Slovenian cyclist Janez Brajkovic tested positive for Methylhexaneamine at the Tour of Croatia and was banned for 10 months.
- On 13 June Spanish cyclist Igor Merino tested positive for GHRPs and was banned for four years.
- On 27 June Spanish cyclist Jaime Roson (Movistar Team) was found guilty of using prohibited methods and/or substances and was banned for four years.
- On 23 July Italian cyclist Leonardo Melle tested positive for Clostebol and was banned for a year.
- On 18 August South African cyclist Rickardo Broxham tested positive for Heptaminol and was banned for one year.
- On 2 September Italian cyclist Alfonso D'Errico tested positive for Methylhexaneamine and was banned for six months.
- On 15 September Ukrainian cyclist Maksym Vasyliev tested positive for Methylhexaneamine at the Primus Classic and was banned for 10 months.
- On 12 October Argentinian cyclist German Ariel Lopez tested positive for anabolic androgenic steroids at the UCI Masters Track Cycling World Championships and was banned for four years.
- On 31 October Costa Rican cyclist Anthony Ortega returned an adverse analytical finding for blood transfusions at the Vuelta a Guatemala and was banned for 4 years.

=== 2019 ===
- On 13 January Azerbaijani cyclist Olena Pavlukhina was banned for four years after confirmation of the usage of prohibited methods and/or substances at the 2016 UCI Road World Championships
- On 3 March Austrian cyclist Stefan Denifl (CCC Pro Team) confessed to the Austrian police of blood doping, during the Operation Aderlass (Operation Bloodletting) investigation.
- On 4 March Austrian cyclist Georg Preidler (Groupama–FDJ) confessed to the Austrian police of blood doping, during the Operation Aderlass (Operation Bloodletting) investigation.
- On 26 March Argentinian cyclist Daniel Zamora (Agrupacion Virgen De Fatima) tested positive for EPO at the Vuelta a San Juan after claiming victory in the mountains and best-placed Argentinian classification.
- On 5 April Dutch cyclo-cross rider Denise Betsema (Marlux-Bingoal) returned an adverse analytical finding for a prohibited endogenous anabolic androgenic steroids. On 16 May, it was announced her B sample was positive for anabolic steroids as well.

== 2020s ==
=== 2022 ===
- On 17 August, Colombian rider Nairo Quintana (Arkéa–Samsic) was disqualified from his recent 6th-place finish in the Tour de France, after testing positive for tramadol. In-competition use of tramadol was banned by the UCI Medical Regulations starting on 1 March 2019 in order to protect riders from its side effects. Since tramadol was not on the WADA prohibited substances list, Quintana's positive test did not constitute an anti-doping rule violation. Quintana appealed his disqualification to the Court of Arbitration of Sport (CAS) which upheld the decision of the UCI. WADA has since decided to add tramadol to its list of prohibited substances, effective 1 January 2024.

=== 2023 ===
- On 25 July, The UCI announced that Colombian Miguel Ángel López had been provisionally suspended due to an anti-doping rule violation for use and possession of a prohibited substance in the weeks prior to the 2022 Giro d'Italia. On 29 May 2024, the UCI Anti-Doping Tribunal found López guilty of anti-doping rule violation (ADRV) for use and possession of a prohibited substance (Menotropin). He was banned from competition for four years, inclusive of his previous suspension, lasting until 24 July 2027. López filed an appeal with the Court of Arbitration for Sport, which was rejected in May 2025.

=== 2024 ===
- Andrea Piccolo was terminated by his team after being arrested while carrying human growth hormone.
- On 10 September Ilkhan Dostiyev (Astana Qazaqstan Development Team) was suspended and had his contract terminated after admitting to using a banned substance following an anti-doping rule violation in July 2024.

=== 2025 ===
- On 11 September Giovanni Carboni (Unibet Tietema Rockets) was provisionally suspended by the UCI, after they found unexplained abnormalities in his biological passport (ABP) in 2024. His team, Unibet Tietema Rockets, said that they were shocked, and they terminated Carboni's contract with immediate effect.
- On 30 October, Oier Lazkano (Red Bull–Bora–Hansgrohe) was provisionally suspended by the UCI due to biological passport abnormalities between 2022 and 2024 (when Lazkano was a member of Movistar Team). Red Bull-Bora-Hansgrohe announced he was no longer part of the team in light of the suspension.

== See also ==
- Mechanical doping
- Doping at the Olympic Games
