= Doping at the Tour de France =

Use of illegal substances by cyclists in the Tour de France

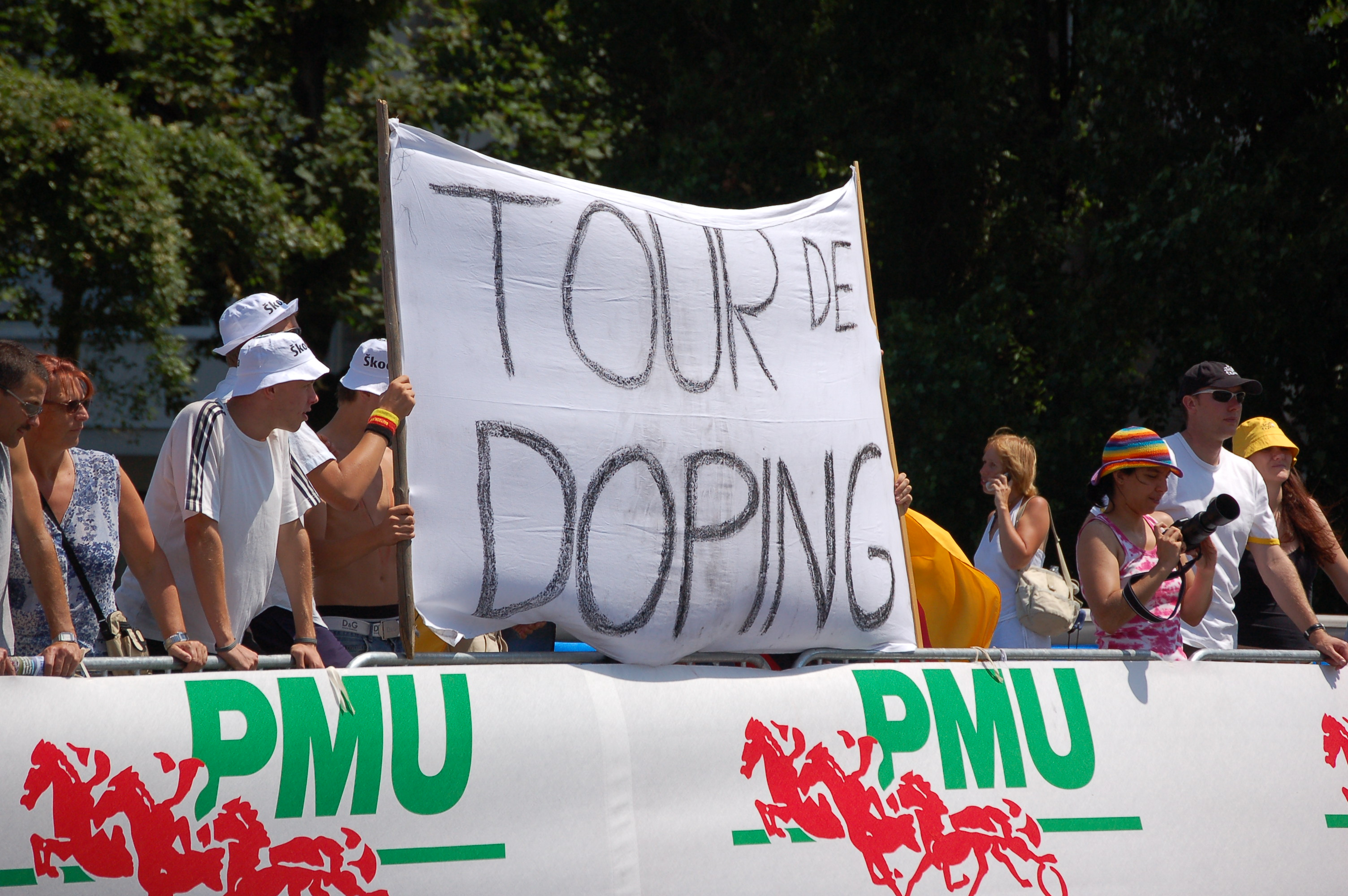
Spectators' banner during the Tour de France 2006

There have been allegations of doping in the Tour de France since the race began in 1903. Early Tour riders consumed alcohol and used ether, among other substances, as a means of dulling the pain of competing in endurance cycling. Riders began using substances as a means of increasing performance rather than dulling the senses, and organizing bodies such as the Tour and the International Cycling Union (UCI), as well as government bodies, enacted policies to combat the practice.

Use of performance-enhancing drugs in cycling predates the Tour de France. Cycling, having been from the start a sport of extremes, whether of speed by being paced by tandems, motorcycles and even cars, or of distance, the suffering involved encouraged the means to alleviate it. Not until after World War II were sporting or even particularly health issues raised. Those came shortly before the death of Tom Simpson in the Tour de France of 1967. Max Novich referred to the Tour de France in a 1973 issue of New York State Journal of Medicine as "a cycling nightmare". Journalist Hans Halter wrote in 1998 that "For as long as the Tour has existed, since 1903, its participants have been doping themselves. For 60 years doping was allowed. For the past 30 years it has been officially prohibited. Yet the fact remains; great cyclists have been doping themselves, then and now."

== Early doping in cycling ==
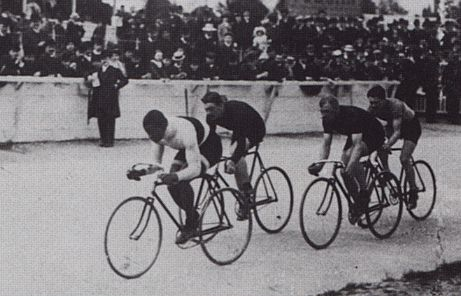
Major Taylor racing in Paris 1908

Drug-taking in cycling predates the Tour de France. "It existed, it has always existed", said the French reporter and author, Pierre Chany, who followed 49 Tours before his death in 1996. The exhaustion of six-day races on the track was countered by the riders' soigneurs (the French word for "carer"), helpers akin to seconds in boxing. Among the treatments they supplied was nitroglycerine, a drug used to stimulate the heart after cardiac attacks and which was credited with improving riders' breathing. Riders suffered hallucinations from the exhaustion and perhaps the drugs. The American champion Major Taylor refused to continue the New York race, saying: "I cannot go on with safety, for there is a man chasing me around the ring with a knife in his hand."

Also used was strychnine, which in small doses tightened tired muscles. A track rider of the era said he had developed such a tolerance to the drug that he took doses large enough to kill smaller men. The use of strychnine, far from being banned, was thought necessary to survive demanding races, says the sports historian Alain Lunzenfichter.

The American specialist in doping, Max M. Novich, wrote: "Trainers of the old school who supplied treatments which had cocaine as their base declared with assurance that a rider tired by a six-day race would get his second breath after absorbing these mixtures." John Hoberman, a professor at the University of Texas in Austin, Texas, said six-day races were "de facto experiments investigating the physiology of stress as well as the substances that might alleviate exhaustion."

The first backers of races on the road were newspapers. Although Le Vélocipède Illustré, which was behind the world's first long-distance road race in November 1869, said its purpose was "to further the good cause of the bicycle" because "it must be determined that the bicycle can be raced over considerable distances with incomparably less fatigue than running", backing the race would also boost the newspaper's sales. In an era before radio and television, newspapers could build the drama of a race for weeks, rely on customers buying a further copy on the day to prepare for the riders to pass and then another next day to see what had become of them. Few people had travelled 130 km, at least not often, and the idea of doing it by bicycle and at as high a speed as possible when the roads were potholed and bicycles had wooden wheels and metal tyres was exciting. The result was that newspapers outdid each other in promotions. In 1891 came a race from Bordeaux to Paris. In the same year, Le Petit Journal went twice as far by running Paris–Brest–Paris over 1,200 km.

During a meeting at L'Auto in Paris, journalist Géo Lefèvre suggested a race right round France, not just one day but six, "like the six-day races on the track." The idea of bringing the excess of the indoors to the roads of the outdoors was born. And with it came the practices which had seen riders through their suffering.

== 1903–1940s: Doping As Acceptable Means ==
The strongest drug in the early Tour de France was strychnine. Other than that, riders would take anything to survive the tedium, the pain and the exhaustion of stages that could last more than 300 km. That included alcohol, which was already strong in French culture and sometimes purer than water after World War I destroyed water pipes and polluted water tables, and ether. There are photographs of riders holding ether-soaked handkerchiefs to their mouths, or leaving them knotted under the chin so the fumes would deaden the pain in their legs. The smell, enough to turn a man's stomach said Pierre Chany, discouraged some but also showed the extent of suffering by others. Roger Lapébie, winner of the Tour in 1937, said he smelled ether "in the bunch near the finish; it used to be taken in a little bottle called a topette." Its use lasted decades; riders were caught using it as late as 1963.

The acceptance of drug-taking in the Tour de France was so complete by 1930, when the race changed to national teams that were to be paid for by the organisers, that the rule book distributed to riders by the organiser, Henri Desgrange, reminded them that drugs were not among items with which they would be provided. In a 1949 interview with Fausto Coppi, the 1949 and 1952 Tour winner, he admitted to amphetamine use and said "those who claim [that cyclists do not take amphetamine], it's not worth talking to them about cycling".

=== The Convicts of the Road ===
In 1924 the journalist Albert Londres followed the Tour de France for the French newspaper, Le Petit Parisien. At Coutances he heard that the previous year's winner, Henri Pélissier, his brother Francis and a third rider, Maurice Ville, had pulled out after a row with the organiser, Henri Desgrange. Henri Pélissier explained the problem – whether or not he had the right to take off a jersey – and went on to talk of drugs, reported in Londres' race diary, in which he coined the phrase Les Forçats de la Route (The Convicts of the Road):

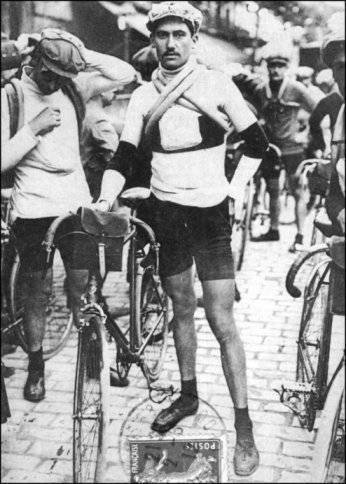
Henri Pélissier, 1919

"You have no idea what the Tour de France is", Henri said. "It's a Calvary. Worse than that, because the road to the Cross has only 14 stations and ours has 15. We suffer from the start to the end. You want to know how we keep going? Here..." He pulled a phial from his bag. "That's cocaine, for our eyes. This is chloroform, for our gums."

"This", Ville said, emptying his shoulder bag "is liniment to put warmth back into our knees."

"And pills. Do you want to see pills? Have a look, here are the pills." Each pulled out three boxes.

"The truth is", Francis said, "that we keep going on dynamite."

Henri spoke of being as white as shrouds once the dirt of the day had been washed off, then of their bodies being drained by diarrhoea, before continuing:

"At night, in our rooms, we can't sleep. We twitch and dance and jig about as though we were doing St Vitus's Dance..."

"There's less flesh on our bodies than on a skeleton", Francis said.

Francis Pélissier said much later: "Londres was a famous reporter but he didn't know about cycling. We kidded him a bit with our cocaine and our pills. Even so, the Tour de France in 1924 was no picnic."

== 1950s–1960s: Early anti-doping stance ==
Pierre Dumas was the first doctor to campaign for the testing and suppression of doping, both within cycling and then at international level at the Olympic Games. Dumas came to the Tour de France in 1952 when the original doctor pulled out. Dumas was a judoka rather than a cyclist and had none of the preconceptions established in cycling. He discovered a world in which "there were soigneurs, fakirs, who came from the six-days. Their value was in the contents of their case. Riders took anything they were given, even bee stings and toad extract." He spoke of "medicine from the heart of Africa... healers laying on hands or giving out irradiating balms, feet plunged into unbelievable mixtures which could lead to eczema, so-called magnetised diets and everything else you could imagine. In 1953 and 1954 it was all magic, medicine and sorcery. After that, they started reading Vidal [the French medicine directory]."

Such was the extent to which stronger drugs entered cycling that the French team manager, Marcel Bidot, was cited to an inquiry by the Council of Europe as saying: "Three-quarters of riders were doped. I am well placed to know that since I visited their rooms each evening during the Tour. I always left frightened after these visits." At the 1956 Tour, it was evident how much drug-taking and the "care" of riders had changed. After stage 14, all members of the Belgian team chose to abandon the race following a "mystery illness". Insiders suspected doping usage as the real reason, while the team attributed the illness to a dinner of 'bad fish' they had eaten, an excuse which was reused in both 1962 and 1991.

In 1960, Pierre Dumas walked into a hotel bedroom on his nightly tour of teams to find eventual winner Gastone Nencini prone on his bed with a plastic tube running from each arm to a bottle containing hormones. However, the hormone injection was not illegal at the time, and indeed only few were disqualified or sanctioned whenever they were found out to use doping.

=== Malléjac incident ===
On stage 12 of the 1955 Tour, the riders went over Mount Ventoux. Ten kilometres from the summit, said the journalist Jacques Augendre, French rider Jean Malléjac was: "Streaming with sweat, haggard and comatose, he was zigzagging and the road wasn't wide enough for him... He was already no longer in the real world, still less in the world of cyclists and the Tour de France." Malléjac collapsed, falling to the ground with one foot still trapped in a pedal. The other leg pedalled on in the air. He was, said Pierre Chany, "completely unconscious, his face the colour of a corpse, a freezing sweat ran on his forehead.

Malléjac was hauled to the side of the road by Sauveur Ducazeaux, an official of another team, and Dumas summoned. Georges Pahnoud of the Télégramme de Brest reported:

He had to force [Malléjec's] jaws apart to try to make him drink and it was a quarter of an hour later, after he had received an injection of solucamphor and been given oxygen, that Malléjac regained consciousness. Taken by ambulance, he hadn't however completely recovered. He fought, he gesticulated, he shouted, demanded his bike, wanted to get out.

Dumas had to strap Malléjac down for the journey to hospital at Avignon. Mallejac insisted that he had been given a drugged bottle from a soigneur, whom he did not name, and said that while his other belongings had reached the hospital intact, the bottle had been emptied and could not be analysed. Malléjac insisted that he wanted to start legal proceedings, and Dumas said: "I'm prepared to call for a charge of attempted murder." The incident was never resolved, however, with Mallejac returning for subsequent Tours and denying any wrongdoing for the rest of his life.

=== Too drugged to pull on the brakes ===
In the 1960 Tour, Roger Rivière was second to the Italian Gastone Nencini, a rider he planned to beat by tagging along with him in the mountains and then speeding away on the flat. The problem was that Nencini was lighter and a better climber and that he was such a fast descender that, in the view of another French rider, Raphaël Géminiani, "the only reason to follow Nencini downhill is if you've got a death wish."

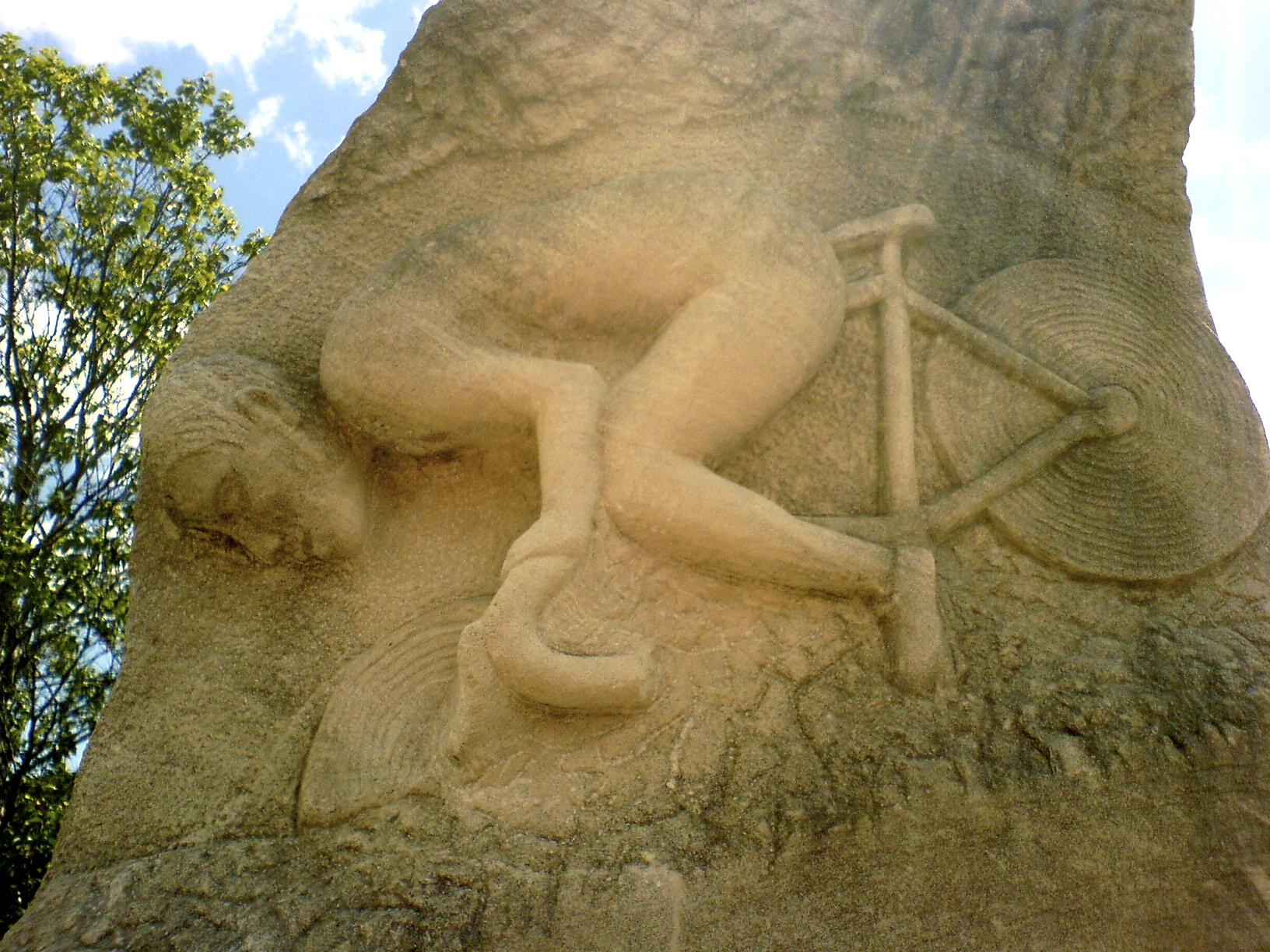
A monument recording the fall of Rivière.

Rivière was able to stay with Nencini on the climb to the Col de Perjuret, as the pair crossed the summit together. Then came a series of descending zigzags. Nencini took the perfect line and Rivière, trying to match him, overshot a bend, fell into a ravine, and broke his back. There he was found by his teammate, Louis Rostollan.

Rivière quickly passed the blame for his fall and his broken back on the team mechanic, accusing him of leaving oil on the wheels and the brakes for not working. The mechanic was outraged, and the doctors soon found the real reason – that so much painkiller was in Rivière's blood that his hands were too slow to operate the brakes. He had taken a heavy dose of the opioid painkiller dextromoramide (Palfium), to help him stay with Nencini on Col de Perjuret. Rivière later admitted to being a drug addict, telling a newspaper how he had doped to beat the world hour record, and admitted downing thousands of tablets a year.

=== Wiel's affair ===
The stage from Luchon to Carcassonne in 1962 set off 10 minutes later than scheduled because the German rider, Hans Junkermann, had been ill most of the night. At first he was not going to start. When he said that after all he felt well enough, the organisers gave him the extra time to get ready. Junkermann was leader of the Wiel's–Groene Leeuw team and was allowed his privilege because he was in eighth position.

Junkermann soon dropped to the back of the field and after 50 km he lost contact. On the first hill he got off his bike and sat by the roadside. "I ate bad fish at the hotel last night", he told onlookers. The same complaint came all day. A total twenty riders fell ill, and eleven others abandoned the Tour that day, including the former leader, Willy Schroeders, the 1960 winner Gastone Nencini and a future leader, Karl-Heinz Kunde.

Jacques Goddet wrote that he suspected doping but nothing was proven – other than that none of the hotels the previous night had served fish, the hoteliers being anxious to clear their reputation. Pierre Dumas spoke of "certain preparations" and speculated the riders were given the same tainted drug by one of the soigneurs. Team managers grew angry at the several days of newspaper reporting that followed and came close to calling for a strike.

== 1965: Criminalization of doping ==
In 1960, the Danish rider Knud Enemark Jensen collapsed during the 100 km team time trial at the 1960 Olympic Games in Rome and died later in hospital. The autopsy showed he had taken amphetamine and another drug, Ronicol, which dilates the blood vessels. Pierre Dumas then led a committee of doctors demanding tests at the following Games. A national anti-doping law entered French legislation in June 1965. Performance-enhancing drugs were now illegal in France, and the first anti-doping testing began at the 1966 Tour. That year, amphetamine use in France was running at almost a third of those tested.

Alec Taylor, team manager of rider Tom Simpson who died following doping usage in the 1967 Tour, said officials treated controls in fear, knowing what was there, afraid of what they might find.

Race officials, federations, even the law on the Continent have been lax. Before Tom's death I saw on the Continent the overcautious way riders were tested for dope, as if the authorities feared to lift the veil, scared of how to handle the results; knowing all the while what they would be. They called on the law to act, enabling them to shelter under its wing and feel secure from interminable court actions and claims. They let the show carry on while the law acted light-heartedly, without vigour and purpose – and its deterrent had no effect.

=== First anti-doping test and a strike ===
Testers arrived at the Tour de France for the first time in 1966, in Bordeaux, although only after word had spread and many riders had left their hotels. The first competitor they found was Raymond Poulidor, who became the first rider to be tested in the Tour. He said:

"I was strolling down the corridor in ordinary clothes when I came across two guys in plain clothes. They showed me their cards and said to me: 'You're riding the Tour?'
"I said: 'Yes'.
'You're a rider?'
"I said: 'Yes'.
'OK, come with us.'
"I swear it happened just like that. They made me go into a room, I pissed into some bottles and they closed them without sealing them. Then they took my name, my date of birth, without asking for anything to check my identity. I could have been anyone, and they could have done anything they liked with the bottles."

A few other riders were found, including Rik Van Looy; some obliged and others refused. Next morning, the race left the city on the way to the Pyrenees and stopped in the suburb of Gradignan, in the university area of La House. The riders climbed off and began walking, shouting protests in general and in particular abuse at Pierre Dumas, whom some demanded should also take a test to see if he had been drinking wine or taking aspirin to make his own job easier.

=== Death of Tom Simpson ===
Tom Simpson was the leader of the British team in the 1967 Tour de France. At the start of stage 13 on Thursday 13 July, he was still suffering the effects of a stomach bug he had endured earlier in the race. It was a blisteringly hot day, and he was seen to drink brandy during the early parts of the stage. In those years, the organisers limited each rider to four bottles of water, about two litres – the effects of dehydration being poorly understood. During races, riders often raided roadside bars and cafes for drinks, and filled their bottles from fountains.

About two kilometres from the summit of the day's main climb, Mont Ventoux, Simpson began to zig-zag across the road, eventually falling against an embankment. While his team-car helpers wanted him to retire from the race, Simpson insisted on being put back on his cycle and he continued for another 500 m or so before again beginning to falter; he toppled unconscious into the arms of his helpers, still gripping his handlebars. A motorcycle policeman summoned Pierre Dumas, who took over team officials' first attempts at saving Simpson, including mouth-to-mouth resuscitation. Dumas massaged Simpson's heart and gave him oxygen. A race helicopter then took Simpson to hospital but Simpson was declared dead soon after his arrival.

Drug usage was only hinted at in the news coverage, particularly by Jacques Goddet, who referred in L'Équipe to Simpson's "errors in the way he looked after himself." Then a British reporter, J. L. Manning, broke the news that two empty tubes and a third full of amphetamines were found in the pocket of his jersey. Manning was a serious and well-respected journalist. His exposure, the first time a formal connection had been made between drugs and Simpson's death, set off a wave of similar reporting in Britain and elsewhere. The following month, Manning went further, in a piece headed "Evidence in the case of Simpson who crossed the frontier of endurance without being able to know he had 'had enough'":

The question of whether Tommy Simpson's death in the Tour de France might have been prevented has one clear answer. Yes, and it should have been. Three days after this year's race, the French authorities announced that next October and November a French and Italian rider would be prosecuted for alleged doping offences in last year's Tour. France had surrendered the need rigorously to prevent doping to the discreet requirement of not tackling it on a big tourist occasion until a year had safely passed. It takes two days at most to analyse samples: it took a year for France to authorise prosecutions.

[…] Is France trying to hush up the scandals of the Tour? I say yes. The first act of hushing up is not to attempt detection, let alone waiting a year before taking action. How much husher can you get?

=== Steroids and allied drugs ===
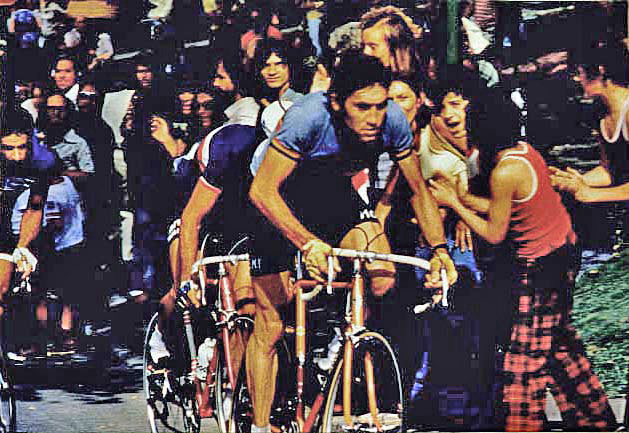
Merckx at the 1974 World Cycling Championships held in Montreal.

During 1974, a number of riders failed tests for amphetamines, including Claude Tollet at the Tour. In 1977, a test for amphetamine-like drug Pemoline was perfected, catching five-time Tour de France winner Eddy Merckx among others. Far from abandoning drugs, riders and their helpers concentrated on finding alternatives that could not be detected. Five-time Tour de France winner Jacques Anquetil argued that stopping riders using amphetamine would not stop doping, but merely lead riders to use more dangerous drugs. In the 1970s, cycling moved into the steroid era. According to Dr Jean-Pierre de Mondenard, steroids were not used to build muscle bulk, but rather to improve recovery and thereby let competitors train harder and longer and with less rest. There is also a secondary stimulant effect.

De Mondenard argued that such was the acceptance of steroids and then of corticoids that only the cost – which he put in prices of the time as between 35,000 and 50,000 French francs – was likely to restrict use. Only the richest or the most ambitious riders could afford that. And the rewards could be high: Bernard Thévenet won the 1975 and 1977 Tour de France editions by using cortisone. "I was doped with cortisone for three years and there were many like me", he said. The experience had ruined his health, he said.

Spanish rider Luis Ocaña failed tests in his last participation in the Tour de France in 1977 which was called the Tour of Doping.

Testing took time to adapt, but in 1978 Belgian rider Jean-Luc van den Broucke failed tests for steroid use, and said:

In the Tour de France, I took steroids. That is not a stimulant, just a strengthener. If I hadn't, I would have had to give up. […] On the first rest day, before we went into the Pyrenees, I had a first hormone injection. I had another one on the second day, at the start of the last week. You can't call that medically harmful, not if it's done under a doctor's control and within reason.

There was a mass of steroids used in the Tour, everyone will admit that. How can we stay at the top otherwise? Even at Munich [at the world track championship] it was used a lot. I hope the riders will get together next season and take action. Who can ride classics and long-distance Tours the whole year through without strengtheners?

=== Pollentier incident ===
Riders became adept at circumventing controls. Their advisers learned to calculate how long it would take a drug to move from blood into urine, and therefore how much time a rider could risk waiting before going to a drugs test. Sometimes, riders simply cheated, as was revealed to the world in 1978.

The rider was Michel Pollentier, who that year was the Belgian national champion and therefore wearing his national colours of red, yellow and black. By the end of the stage which finished on Alpe d'Huez he had taken the race lead and could change his champion's jersey for the yellow jersey as leader of the general classification.

Pollentier was called to the drugs test with José Nazabal and Antoine Gutierrez. Nazabal gave his sample but left the race that night. When Gutierrez went to provide his sample, the doctor – a man called Le Calvez spending his first day with the race – grew suspicious and tugged up his jersey, revealing a system of tubes and a bottle of urine. He then pulled down Pollentier's shorts and found him similarly equipped. Reports in the press called the supply of urine – somebody else's urine – as being in a bottle. Riders called it a "pear". In fact it was a condom. The tube ran from there to the riders' shorts so that pressure on the condom, held under the armpit, would give the impression of urinating.

Pollentier's manager, Fred De Bruyne, who was in the test caravan, told a news conference:

I congratulated Michel and then sat down. On my left was Gutierrez, trying to provide a sample for the doctor, while Pollentier was in the other corner. They both had difficulty in urinating... Suddenly, the doctor cried out: 'What are you doing?' to Gutierrez. I looked round and saw there was some urine in the Frenchman's test flask and a small plastic tube in his hand. He was confused and tried to say the tube had been in his pocket. I was overcome with surprise and thought 'I'm glad he isn't one of my team'. But then, about a minute later, panic returned when the doctor pulled down Pollentier's shorts and revealed this plastic tube which you all now know about.

The doctor said that Pollentier had not actually used the tube and so the test would go ahead as normal. At 8pm, the organiser, Félix Lévitan, told the press that the UCI had ruled that Pollentier would be fined 5,000 Swiss francs and start an immediate suspension of two months. The question was obvious: if a rider was prepared to take drugs and win a stage, knowing he would be tested, how many times had the ruse been shown to work before?

== The era of EPO (1990s – 2000s) ==
When other drugs became detectable, riders began achieving the effects of transfusion more effectively by using erythropoietin, known as EPO, a drug to increase red-cell production in anaemia sufferers. EPO became widespread, as a flurry of exposures and confessions revealed in 2006 and 2007. "When I saw riders with fat arses climbing cols like aeroplanes, I understood what was happening", said the Colombian rider, Luis Herrera.

EPO's problem for testers was that like testosterone and, before that, cortisone, they could not distinguish it from what the body produced naturally. For the first time, said Jean-Pierre de Mondenard, authorities had to settle not for the presence of a drug but its presence in unusual quantities. Testers set a haematocrit limit of 50 per cent and "rested" riders who exceeded it. Bjarne Riis, the Danish rider who won the Tour in 1996, was known as "Mr 60 per cent" among riders. On 25 May 2007, he admitted he had used EPO from 1993 to 1998, including 1996 when he won the Tour.

Cynicism set in among both riders and officials. Jacques Goddet, organiser of the Tour from 1936 to 1987, said in 1999:

I brought controls to the Tour in the wake of Tom Simpson's death in 1967 – and the riders went on strike. After the discoveries made [into the so-called 1998 Festina scandal, see below], I feel real resentment towards the medical and scientific powers who deceived us for 30 years. The controls are almost always negative, which means that the labs have been making serious mistakes, mistakes that have only served to speed up the growth of this evil. The controls we developed after Simpson's death were a lie, covered up by the highest scientific and medical authorities, and I condemn them.

Since 1997, the Swiss Laboratory for Doping Analyses is the testing laboratory of the Tour de France.

=== 1998 Festina scandal ===
On 8 July 1998, French Customs arrested Willy Voet, a soigneur for the Festina team, for the possession of illegal drugs, including narcotics, erythropoietin (EPO), growth hormones, testosterone, and amphetamines. Voet later described many common doping practices in his book, Massacre à la Chaîne. On 23 July 1998, French police raided several teams' hotels and found drugs in the possession of the TVM team. As news spread, riders staged a sit-down strike during the 17th stage. After mediation by Jean-Marie Leblanc, the director of the Tour, police agreed to limit the most heavy-handed tactics and riders agreed to continue. Many riders and teams had already abandoned the race and only 111 riders completed the stage. In a 2000 trial, it became clear that the management and health officials of Festina had organized drug-taking within the team. Richard Virenque, a top Festina rider, finally confessed after being ridiculed for maintaining that if he was doping he was somehow not consciously aware of it – as the satirical television programme, Les Guignols de l'Info, put it: "à l'insu de mon plein gré" ("of my own free will but without my knowing").

In the years following the 1998 Festina affair, anti-doping measures were put into effect by race organizers and the UCI, including more frequent testing and new tests for blood doping transfusions and EPO use. The World Anti-Doping Agency (WADA) was also created to help governments in anti-doping.

Evidence of drugs persisted and in 2004 came new allegations. In January, Philippe Gaumont, a rider with the Cofidis team, told investigators and the press that steroids, human growth hormone, EPO, and amphetamines were endemic to the team. In June, British cyclist David Millar, also of Cofidis, and time trial world champion, was detained by French police, his apartment searched and two used EPO syringes found. Jesús Manzano, a Spanish rider then recently dismissed by the Kelme team, told the Madrid sports newspaper AS he had been forced by his former team to take banned substances and that they had taught him to evade detection. The Kelme team itself was ultimately a casualty of the disclosures, which Manzano judged to be "an eye for an eye and a tooth for a tooth."

=== Lance Armstrong ===
L'Équipe cover accusing Armstrong of doping. The title translates to "The Armstrong Lie". 23 August 2006.

Lance Armstrong has become a symbol for doping at the Tour de France. Suspicions arose initially over his association with Italian physician Michele Ferrari and his extraordinary achievements on the road. In 1999, Armstrong failed tests for a glucocorticosteroid hormone. Armstrong explained he had used an external cortisone ointment to treat a saddle sore and produced a prescription for it. The amount detected was below the threshold and said to be consistent with the amount used for a topical skin cream, but UCI rules required that prescriptions be shown to sports authorities in advance of use. Armstrong's former assistant, Mike Anderson, stated that Armstrong used a substance with a trade name similar to "androstenine". This resulted in a lawsuit against Anderson and a countersuit against Armstrong.

In late August 2005, one month after Lance Armstrong's seventh consecutive Tour victory, the French sports newspaper L'Équipe claimed evidence that Armstrong had used EPO in the 1999 Tour de France. The claim was based on urine samples archived by the French National Laboratory for Doping Detection (LNDD) for research. Armstrong denied using EPO and the UCI did not penalise him because of the lack of a duplicate sample. The UCI confirmed that its own doctor Mario Zorzoli leaked the 15 forms tying Armstrong to the failed tests to L'Équipe.

On 22 October 2012, Armstrong was banned for life and stripped of all his titles since 1 August 1998, including all seven of his Tour de France victories, because an investigation by USADA concluded that he had been engaged in a massive doping scheme. He later admitted to doping in a 2013 interview with Oprah Winfrey.

Of the cyclists who finished on the podium in the era in which Lance Armstrong won the Tour de France seven times (1999–2005), Fernando Escartín is the sole rider not to be implicated in a doping scandal. Due to 20 of the 21 podium finishers "directly tied to likely doping through admissions, sanctions, public investigations or exceeding the UCI hematocrit (a blood test to discover EPO use) threshold", Escartin's third-place finish in the 1999 Tour de France stands as the lone of the 21 podium finishes that was untainted, during the years (1999–2005) in which Lance Armstrong finished the Tour de France in first place.

=== 2006 Tour de France ===
==== Operación Puerto investigation ====
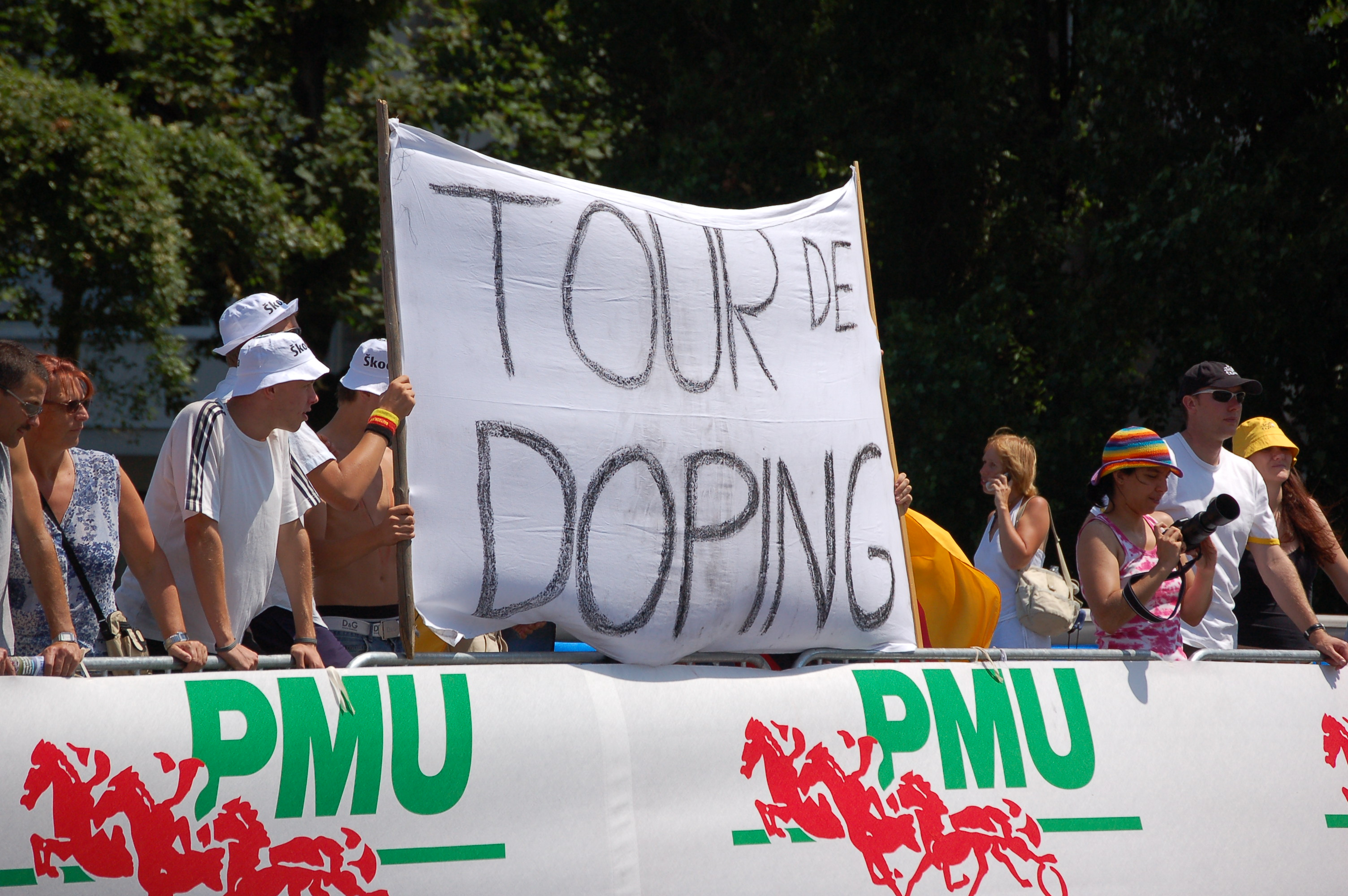
An anti-doping banner displayed during the route of 2006 Tour de France prologue

In 2006, several riders, including Jan Ullrich and Ivan Basso, were barred from the eve of the race amid allegations by Spanish police as a result of their Operación Puerto investigation.

The Astana-Würth team could not start because, despite a ruling by the Court of Arbitration for Sport, five of its nine Tour riders were barred after being officially named in the Operacion Puerto affair. With only four riders remaining (Alexander Vinokourov, Andrey Kashechkin, Carlos Barredo and Luis León Sánchez) the team did not have the minimum number of riders demanded by the rules to enter.

The cyclists excluded from 2006 Tour de France were:

- Astana-Würth team:
  - Alberto Contador, cleared by Spanish court on 26 July 2006.
  - Joseba Beloki, cleared by Spanish court on 26 July 2006.
  - Allan Davis, cleared by Spanish court on 26 July 2006.
  - Isidro Nozal, cleared by Spanish court on 26 July 2006.
  - Sérgio Paulinho, cleared by Spanish court on 26 July 2006.
- Individuals:
  - Ivan Basso, (CSC)
  - Francisco Mancebo, (AG2R Prévoyance)
  - Jan Ullrich, (T-Mobile Team)
  - Óscar Sevilla, (T-Mobile Team)

==== Floyd Landis accusation ====
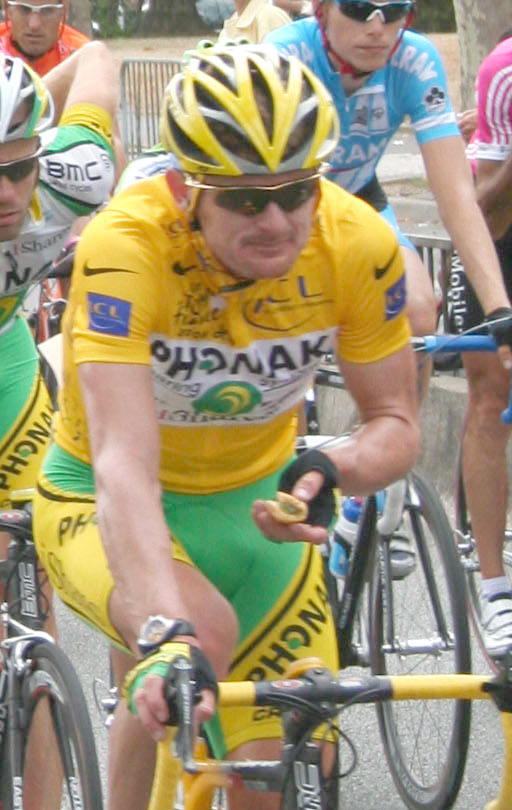
Floyd Landis at the 2006 Tour de France

On 27 July 2006, the Phonak team announced that Floyd Landis, winner of the 2006 Tour, failed a test after stage 17 for an abnormally high ratio of the hormone testosterone to epitestosterone. On the day the allegations were made public, Landis denied doping. Landis' personal doctor later revealed the test had found a ratio of 11:1 in Landis' blood; the permitted ratio is 4:1. On 31 July 2006, The New York Times reported that tests on Landis' sample revealed some synthetic testosterone. He was later stripped of his title and banned from cycling for two years.

=== 2007 Tour de France ===
The 2007 Tour de France was dogged by controversies from the start. On 18 July, two German television companies pulled out of coverage after T-Mobile's German rider, Patrik Sinkewitz, failed a test for testosterone on 8 June at a pre-Tour training camp.

Alessandro Petacchi, a sprint specialist, failed a test for salbutamol at Pinerolo on 23 May in the 2007 Giro d'Italia, the day of the third of his five-stage wins in the event. Petacchi, an asthma sufferer, was suspended by Milram and forced to miss the Tour de France. He was later cleared after the drug was deemed to be therapeutic use.

On 19 June it was revealed that the leader, Michael Rasmussen, was under suspicion for missing two out-of-competition doping tests. The Dane had been dropped by the Danish Cycling Union and his Olympic place was under review. However, with information available at the time, Rasmussen had not committed an offence under UCI rules and he remained in the yellow jersey. On 8 November Rasmussen admitted providing false information to the UCI.

Then on 24 July it was revealed that Alexander Vinokourov had failed a test for blood doping after the time trial in Albi, which he won by more than a minute As a result, the Astana Team withdrew. Vinokourov's teammates Andreas Klöden and Andrey Kashechkin were fifth and seventh at the time. Vinokourov also failed tests for blood doping after winning Monday's stage 15.

Following the Vinokourov announcement, Tour director Christian Prudhomme said professional cycling needed a "complete overhaul" to combat doping.

A day later, after winning the 16th stage on the Col d'Aubisque—a victory that assured he would be the overall winner—it was alleged that Rasmussen had lied to his Rabobank team about his whereabouts on 13 and 14 June, prior to the Tour. For breaching team rules, he was removed from the race. It was later revealed that the Tour organiser, Amaury Sport Organisation, had pressed Rabobank to remove Rasmussen. On the same day, Team Cofidis pulled out following the failed test on their rider Cristian Moreni.

The Tour continued to be embroiled in doping controversies even after it finished. It emerged that Spanish cyclist (and 16th placed rider) Iban Mayo had failed a test for EPO on the second rest day, on 24 July. He was suspended by his team Saunier Duval–Prodir. Mayo had previously failed tests for synthetic testosterone during the 2007 Giro d'Italia, but the UCI found that he had not breached any doping regulation.

Tour winner Alberto Contador also continued to be linked to doping allegations, focussing on his relationship with Eufemiano Fuentes and his role in Operación Puerto, but without new revelations. Contador was tested in the Tour after stages 14, 17, and 18 and no discrepancies were reported. Several participants, such as Sébastien Hinault, implied that he is no better than Rasmussen. On 30 July German doping expert Werner Franke accused him of having taken drugs in the past.

== 2012 USADA report ==
In October 2012, USADA released a report on the U.S. Postal Service cycling team and doping. The report contained affidavits from the following riders, each of whom described widespread use by Tour racers of banned substances such as Erythropoietin (EPO), transfused blood, and testosterone. The affidavits implicated Lance Armstrong, who was consequently banned for life and stripped of his seven Tour de France victories.

- Frankie Andreu
- Michael Barry
- Leonardo Bertagnolli
- Volodymyr Bileka
- Tom Danielson
- Tyler Hamilton
- George Hincapie
- Jörg Jaksche
- Floyd Landis
- Levi Leipheimer
- Filippo Simeoni
- Stephen Swart
- Christian Vande Velde
- Jonathan Vaughters
- David Zabriskie

== Testing ==
After each stage, four riders are tested: the overall leader, the stage winner, and two riders at random. In addition, every rider is tested before the first day's stage, normally a short time-trial. Most teams are tested in their entirety at some point during the three-week race. Additional testing may take place during the off-season, and riders are expected to keep their national cycling federation informed of their whereabouts so they can be located. Many teams have their own drug testing programs to keep the team name clean. Teams, such as Quick-Step, have pulled riders before they compete in major competitions. Tom Boonen was pulled for cocaine before the 2008 Tour de France.

== Status of Tour de France winners since 1961 ==
14 of the 25 most recent winners (56%) have either failed tests or have confessed to have used doping. Together with those who failed tests but never sanctioned, 68% of the winners evidently used doping as detailed in the table below.

Years	Name	Status	Details
2022 2023	Jonas Vingegaard	Never failed tests	
2020; 2021; 2024; 2025	Tadej Pogačar	Never failed tests	
2019	Egan Bernal	Never failed tests	
2018	Geraint Thomas	Never failed tests	
2014	Vincenzo Nibali	Never failed tests	
2013; 2015; 2016; 2017	Chris Froome	Failed tests Cleared of doping use	Failed tests for salbutamol in 2017; however the UCI officially closed the investigation stating that the rider had supplied sufficient evidence to suggest that the sample results do not constitute an "Adverse Analytical Finding".
2012	Bradley Wiggins	Never failed tests	Implicated in the "Team Sky Jiffy-Bag scandal."
2011	Cadel Evans	Never failed tests	
2010	Andy Schleck	Never failed tests	Named as winner after Contador disqualified.
2007; 2009; 2010	Alberto Contador	Failed tests Banned for two years	Named in Operación Puerto doping case, but later declared clean. Failed tests during 2010 Tour de France for the banned stimulant clenbuterol. Suspended for two years.
2008	Carlos Sastre	Never failed tests	
2006	Óscar Pereiro	Never failed tests	Named as winner after Landis disqualified. Took salbutamol in 2006, but had a Therapeutic Use Exemption (TUE) for the substance as part of asthma treatment.
2006	Floyd Landis	Failed tests Banned for two years	Landis failed tests for high testosterone to epitestosterone ratio. He later admitted to doping throughout his career.
1999–2005	No winner after Armstrong was disqualified. Six of the seven overall runners-up to Armstrong (all except Joseba Beloki in 2002) have either admitted to or been found guilty of doping.		
1999–2005	Lance Armstrong	Failed tests Banned for life. Retroactively stripped of all titles since 1 August 1998. Confessed doping use	Main article: Lance Armstrong doping case Failed tests for glucocorticosteroid hormone without prescription given in advance. Associated with Michele Ferrari, who is suspected of prescribing doping agents. Allegations by former assistant for Androstenine use. Alleged EPO use in 1999 Tour de France. According to court testimony by former teammate, Frankie Andreu, Armstrong admitted to doping to his doctor when in hospital for cancer treatment. Floyd Landis accused Armstrong of doping in 2002 and 2003, and claimed that U.S. Postal team director Johan Bruyneel had bribed former UCI president Hein Verbruggen to keep quiet about a failed test by Armstrong in 2002. Landis also maintains that he witnessed Armstrong receiving multiple blood transfusions, and dispensing testosterone patches to his teammates on the United States Postal Service Team. Former teammate Tyler Hamilton accused Armstrong of doping with testimony to a federal grand jury during an investigation of Armstrong. Hamilton implicated that Armstrong had used EPO on the TV news show 60 Minutes. Implicated in a massive doping scheme by findings by USADA in 2012. Consequently, banned for life and stripped of all career titles since 1 August 1998. Admitted to doping in a 2013 interview with Oprah Winfrey.
1998	Marco Pantani	Never failed tests Banned for six months	Failed a blood test in 1999 Giro d'Italia. Insulin found in his hotel room in the 2001 Giro d'Italia, but later declared clean "for not having committed any infraction." Nonetheless, the UCI confirmed the suspension.
1997	Jan Ullrich	Failed tests Banned from the 2006 Tour. Retroactively stripped of titles from 2005 to 2007. Confessed doping use	Failed tests for amphetamines (off season, not taken for athletic performance gain) Involved in the Operacion Puerto case. DNA subsequently linked to blood bag discovered during Puerto investigation Admitted to doping in a 2013 interview with the German magazine Focus.
1996	Bjarne Riis	Never failed tests Confessed doping use	Confessed having used EPO in 1996
1991–1995	Miguel Induráin	Never failed tests	Failed tests for salbutamol in 1994, however both the IOC and UCI allowed Indurain, and asthma sufferers to use salbutamol at the time.
1986; 1989–1990	Greg LeMond	Never failed tests	
1988	Pedro Delgado	Never failed tests	Failed tests for probenecid, a masking agent for anabolic steroids in the 1988 Tour de France but, although banned by the IOC, it was not on the UCI list of banned substances at the time.
1987	Stephen Roche	Never failed tests	Accused of taking EPO in 1993 as part of an investigation in Italy into the practices of Francesco Conconi
1978–1979; 1981–1982; 1985	Bernard Hinault	Never failed tests.	Refused to submit to a doping control at the 1982 Critérium de Callac and was fined and given a one-month conditional suspension.
1983–1984	Laurent Fignon	Failed tests	In 1989 Fignon failed a test after a team time trial failed tests for amphetamines at the Grand Prix de la Liberation in Eindhoven on 17 September 1989.
1980	Joop Zoetemelk	Failed tests	Failed tests in the 1977 (pemoline), 1979 (steroids) and 1983 Tour de France (nandrolon, although that was retracted later). Admitted a blood transfusion on TV interviews right after winning the 10th (and 9th) stage of the 1976 Tour de France, as in that era it was seen as just medical aid.
1975; 1977	Bernard Thévenet	Never failed tests Confessed doping use	Admitted using steroids in the 1975 and 1977 Tour
1976	Lucien Van Impe	Never failed tests	
1969–1972; 1974	Eddy Merckx	Failed tests	Merckx has failed tests three times, but never at the Tour de France. He was expelled from the 1969 Giro d'Italia after testing positive for Reactivan. He failed tests for Mucantil after winning the 1973 Giro di Lombardia. The drug was later taken off the banned list. In the 1977 Flèche Wallonne, Merckx failed tests for Stimul (pemoline), along with Freddy Maertens and Michel Pollentier .
1973	Luis Ocaña	Failed tests	Failed tests in the 1977 Tour de France (pemoline) 18th stage.
1968	Jan Janssen	Never failed tests	
1967	Roger Pingeon	Never failed tests	
1966	Lucien Aimar	Failed tests Banned for one month	Missed the 1969 Vuelta a España due to a one-month doping ban.
1965	Felice Gimondi	Failed tests	Failed tests in the 1968 Giro and 1975 Tour.
1957; 1961–1964	Jacques Anquetil	Confessed doping use	Debated with French government minister on television, saying "Leave me in peace; everybody takes dope." After winning Liège–Bastogne–Liège in 1966, was temporarily disqualified after refusing a drug test, saying he had already been to the toilet. He was later reinstated after he engaged a lawyer as the case was never heard.

== Doping histories of Top-10 finishers, 1997–2015 ==
An overview of the top 10 finishers in the General classification in the Tour de France since 1998, along with their individual doping records.

Riders' finishing positions are color-coded according to doping status, as explained in the legend below. Note that no distinction is made on whether a rider was doped before, during or after the particular race for which his name is listed, except if the rider was officially disqualified, such as Alberto Contador, Bernhard Kohl and Floyd Landis. Except in these circumstances, the color code for a rider is the same in all years, and does not imply or allege that the rider was doped during any particular edition of the Tour.

Legend:

Stripped of result in the current race due to doping.
Failed tests and/or sanctioned for doping in another competition or out of competition at some point in their career.
Admitted to doping without failed tests and/or sanction during career.
Failed tests for doping but later acquitted.
Accused of doping without failed tests, sanction or admittance in their career.
Has never been: stripped of a title, failed tests or sanctioned for doping to date, with no known accusations.

=== 1997 Tour de France ===
Rank	Name	Team	Time	Notes
1	Jan Ullrich (GER)	Telekom	100h 30' 35"	Implicated in Telekom affair and Operación Puerto. Banned retroactively in 2011 for the period 2005–07.
2	Richard Virenque (FRA)	Festina–Lotus	+ 9' 09"	Sanctioned for doping during the Festina affair.
3	Marco Pantani (ITA)	Mercatone Uno	+ 14' 03"	Forced to take a two-week break from racing in 1999 Giro for irregular blood values. Implicated in the Operación Puerto doping case in 2006. Died of a cocaine overdose in 2004.
4	Abraham Olano (ESP)	Banesto	+ 15' 55"	Failed tests for Caffeine and suspended for 3 months in 1994. Named as a client of Francesco Conconi in the 1998 Giardini Margherita investigation.
5	Fernando Escartín (ESP)	Kelme–Costa Blanca	+ 20' 32"	Named as a client of Francesco Conconi. Client of Michele Ferrari.
6	Francesco Casagrande (ITA)	Saeco	+ 22' 47"	In 1998, Casagrande tested positive for doping with testosterone during the Tour de Romandie, and consequently was fired by his team Cofidis. Casagrande was barred from competing in the 2004 Vuelta a España a day before its start due to a high hematocrit level, indicating the use of erythropoietin (EPO), a popular doping product.
7	Bjarne Riis (DEN)	Telekom	+ 26' 34"	Riis confessed on 25 May 2007 to taking EPO, growth hormone and cortisone for 6 years, from 1993 to 1998, including during his victory in the 1996 Tour de France.
8	José María Jiménez (ESP)	Banesto	+ 31' 17"	
9	Laurent Dufaux (SUI)	Saeco	+ 31' 55"	Sanctioned for doping during Festina affair.
10	Roberto Conti (ITA)	Mercatone Uno	+ 32' 26"	After the 2002 Giro d'Italia, Conti was banned for six months for possessing various banned substances for doping.

=== 1998 Tour de France ===
Rank	Name	Team	Time	Notes
1	Marco Pantani	Mercatone Uno	92h 49' 46"	Forced to take a two-week break from racing in 1999 Giro for irregular blood values. Implicated in the Operación Puerto doping case in 2006. Died of a cocaine overdose in 2004.
2	Jan Ullrich	Telekom	+3' 21"	Implicated in Telekom affair and Operación Puerto. Banned retroactively in 2011 for the period 2005–07.
3	Bobby Julich	Cofidis	+4' 08"	Accused of doping by teammate Philippe Gaumont in the book Prisonnier du dopage. Admitted to doping in October 2012.
4	Christophe Rinero	Cofidis	+9' 16"	Accused of doping by teammate Philippe Gaumont in the book Prisonnier du dopage.
5	Michael Boogerd	Rabobank	+11' 26"	Accused by Floyd Landis of blood doping. Allegedly involved in Humanplasma affair. Admitted to use of cortisone, EPO and blood transfusions between 1997 and 2007. Handed a two-year ban in 2016 for historical doping offences.
6	Jean-Cyril Robin	US Postal Service	+14' 57"	
7	Roland Meier	Cofidis	+15' 13"	Tested positive for EPO in 2001.
8	Daniele Nardello	Mapei	+16' 07"	
9	Giuseppe Di Grande	Mapei	+17' 35"	Sentenced to six months imprisonment for violating anti-doping laws in Italy in 2005.
10	Axel Merckx	Polti	+17' 39"	Named as a client of Francesco Conconi in the 1998 Giardini Margherita investigation. Client of Michele Ferrari.

=== 1999 Tour de France ===
Rank	Name	Team	Time	Notes
1	Lance Armstrong (USA)	US Postal Service	91h 32' 16"	Allegedly failed tests for EPO in 1999 in an unofficial test done in 2005 on frozen urine. Client of banned doping doctor Michele Ferrari. Accused by former team members, including Floyd Landis and Tyler Hamilton. Banned for life and stripped of all Tour de France titles in 2012. Admitted to doping at the Tour de France in an interview with Oprah Winfrey held on 17 January 2013.
2	Alex Zülle (SUI)	Banesto	+7' 37"	Admitted to taking EPO during the Festina trial.
3	Fernando Escartín (ESP)	Kelme	+10' 26"	Named as a client of Francesco Conconi. Client of Michele Ferrari.
4	Laurent Dufaux (SUI)	Saeco	+14' 43"	Sanctioned for doping during Festina affair.
5	Ángel Casero (ESP)	Vitalicio Seguros	+15' 11"	Implicated in Operación Puerto.
6	Abraham Olano (ESP)	ONCE	+16' 47"	Failed tests for Caffeine and suspended for 3 months in 1994. Named as a client of Francesco Conconi in the 1998 Giardini Margherita investigation.
7	Daniele Nardello (ITA)	Mapei	+17' 02"	
8	Richard Virenque (FRA)	Polti	+17' 28"	Sanctioned for doping during the Festina affair.
9	Wladimir Belli (ITA)	Festina	+17' 37"	
10	Andrea Peron (ITA)	ONCE	+23' 10"	

=== 2000 Tour de France ===
Rank	Name	Team	Time	Notes
1	Lance Armstrong (USA)	US Postal Service	92h 33' 08"	See #1999 Tour de France
2	Jan Ullrich (GER)	Telekom	+6' 02"	See #1998 Tour de France
3	Joseba Beloki (ESP)	Festina	+10' 04"	Implicated in the Operación Puerto doping case. Name later removed from the case by Spanish officials in 2006.
4	Christophe Moreau (FRA)	Festina	+10' 34"	Failed tests for anabolic steroids in 1998. Admitted to taking EPO during the Festina trial.
5	Roberto Heras (ESP)	Kelme	+11' 50"	Tested positive for EPO at the 2005 Vuelta a España.
6	Richard Virenque (FRA)	Polti	+13' 26"	See #1999 Tour de France
7	Santiago Botero (COL)	Kelme	+14' 18"	Implicated in Operación Puerto and banned from 2006 Tour. Later cleared by Colombian officials.
8	Fernando Escartín (ESP)	Kelme	+17' 21"	See #1999 Tour de France
9	Francisco Mancebo (ESP)	Banesto	+18' 09"	Implicated in Operación Puerto and banned from the 2006 Tour de France.
10	Daniele Nardello (ITA)	Mapei	+18' 25"	

=== 2001 Tour de France ===
Rank	Name	Team	Time	Notes
1	Lance Armstrong (USA)	US Postal Service	86h 17' 28"	See #1999 Tour de France
2	Jan Ullrich (GER)	Telekom	+6' 44"	See #1998 Tour de France
3	Joseba Beloki (ESP)	ONCE	+9' 05"	See #2000 Tour de France
4	Andrei Kivilev (KAZ)	Cofidis	+9' 53"	
5	Igor González (ESP)	ONCE	+13' 28"	Banned for six months in 2000 for nandrolone and again in 2002.
6	François Simon (FRA)	Bonjour	+17' 22"	
7	Óscar Sevilla (ESP)	Kelme	+18' 30"	Implicated in Telekom affair and Operación Puerto. Banned in 2010 after failing tests in the Vuelta a Colombia.
8	Santiago Botero (COL)	Kelme	+20' 55"	See #2000 Tour de France
9	Marcos Antonio Serrano (ESP)	ONCE	+21' 45"	Among the riders named in the Operación Puerto doping case.
10	Michael Boogerd (NED)	Rabobank	+22' 38"	See #1998 Tour de France

=== 2002 Tour de France ===
Rank	Name	Team	Time	Notes
1	Lance Armstrong (USA)	US Postal Service	82h 05' 12"	See #1999 Tour de France
2	Joseba Beloki (ESP)	ONCE	+7' 17"	See #2000 Tour de France
3	Raimondas Rumšas (LIT)	Lampre	+8' 17"	Failed tests for EPO in 2003. Given a four-month suspended prison sentence in 2006 for importing prohibited substances into France.
4	Santiago Botero (COL)	Kelme	+13' 10"	See #2000 Tour de France
5	Igor González (ESP)	ONCE	+13' 54"	See #2001 Tour de France
6	José Azevedo (POR)	ONCE	+15' 44"	
7	Francisco Mancebo (ESP)	iBanesto.com	+16' 05"	See #2000 Tour de France
8	Levi Leipheimer (USA)	Rabobank	+17' 11"	Failed tests for ephedrine 1996 U.S. National Criterium Championships. Admitted to doping during the 2011–2012 USADA investigation and later had all results voided from June 1999 to July 2006.
9	Roberto Heras (ESP)	US Postal Service	+17' 12"	See #2000 Tour de France
10	Carlos Sastre (ESP)	Team CSC	+19' 05"	

=== 2003 Tour de France ===
Rank	Name	Team	Time	Notes
1	Lance Armstrong (USA)	US Postal Service	83h 41' 12"	See #1999 Tour de France
2	Jan Ullrich (GER)	Bianchi	+1' 01"	see #1998 Tour de France
3	Alexander Vinokourov (KAZ)	Telekom	+4' 14"	Blood doping at 2007 Tour de France, one-year ban.
4	Tyler Hamilton (USA)	Team CSC	+6' 17"	Received a two-year ban for blood doping at the 2004 Olympics and the 2004 Vuelta a España. Implicated in the Operación Puerto doping case in 2006. Given an eight-year ban for failing a tests for DHEA in 2009. Admitted to doping during the 2012 USADA investigation.
5	Haimar Zubeldia (ESP)	Euskaltel	+6' 51"	
6	Iban Mayo (ESP)	Euskaltel	+7' 06"	Handed a two-year ban after testing positive for EPO at the 2007 Tour de France.
7	Ivan Basso (ITA)	Fassa Bortolo	+10' 12"	Implicated in Operación Puerto and suspended in 2007 for two years for admitting to planning to use doping.
8	Christophe Moreau (FRA)	Crédit Agricole	+12' 28"	see #2000 Tour de France
9	Carlos Sastre (ESP)	Team CSC	+18' 49"	
10	Francisco Mancebo (ESP)	iBanesto.com	+19' 15"	See #2000 Tour de France

=== 2004 Tour de France ===
Rank	Name	Team	Time	Notes
1	Lance Armstrong (USA)	US Postal Service	83h 36' 02"	See #1999 Tour de France
2	Andreas Klöden (GER)	T-Mobile	+6' 19"	Named among the riders to have received illegal blood transfusions in Freiburg in 2006.
3	Ivan Basso (ITA)	Team CSC	+6' 40"	See #2003 Tour de France
4	Jan Ullrich (GER)	T-Mobile	+8' 50"	See #1998 Tour de France
5	José Azevedo (POR)	US Postal Service	+14' 30"	
6	Francisco Mancebo (ESP)	Illes Balears-Banesto-Santander	+18' 01"	See #2000 Tour de France
7	Georg Totschnig (AUT)	Gerolsteiner	+18' 27"	Charged with lying under oath about his involvement in doping after receiving a blood transfusion during the 2005 Tour de France.
8	Carlos Sastre (ESP)	Team CSC	+19' 51"	
9	Levi Leipheimer (USA)	Rabobank	+20' 12"	See #2002 Tour de France
10	Óscar Pereiro (ESP)	Phonak	+22' 54"	Failed tests for Salbutamol in 2006, but later acquitted.

=== 2005 Tour de France ===
Rank	Name	Team	Time	Notes
1	Lance Armstrong (USA)	Discovery Channel	86h 15' 02"	See #1999 Tour de France
2	Ivan Basso (ITA)	Team CSC	+4' 40"	See #2003 Tour de France
3	Jan Ullrich (GER)	T-Mobile	+6' 21"	see #1998 Tour de France
4	Francisco Mancebo (ESP)	Illes Balears-Caisse d'Epargne	+9' 59"	See #2000 Tour de France
5	Alexander Vinokourov (KAZ)	T-Mobile	+11' 01"	See #2003 Tour de France
6	Levi Leipheimer (USA)	Gerolsteiner	+11' 21"	See #2002 Tour de France
7	Michael Rasmussen (DEN)	Rabobank	+11' 33"	Removed by his own team from the 2007 Tour de France after lying about whereabouts testing violations. Admitted to the use of EPO, human growth hormone, testosterone, DHEA, insulin, IGF-1, cortisone and blood transfusions between 1998 and 2010.
8	Cadel Evans (AUS)	Davitamon–Lotto	+11' 55"	Had a meeting with Michele Ferrari in 2000.
9	Floyd Landis (USA)	Phonak	+12' 44"	See #2006 Tour de France
10	Óscar Pereiro (ESP)	Phonak	+16' 04"	See #2004 Tour de France

=== 2006 Tour de France ===
Rank	Name	Team	Time	Notes
1	Floyd Landis (USA)	Phonak	89h 39' 30"	Failed tests for Testosterone during the 2006 Tour de France and was disqualified from the race. Later admitted to doping throughout his career.
2	Óscar Pereiro (ESP)	Caisse d'Epargne	+ 0' 57"	
3	Andreas Klöden (GER)	T-Mobile	+0' 32"	See #2004 Tour de France
4	Carlos Sastre (ESP)	Team CSC	+2' 16"	
5	Cadel Evans (AUS)	Davitamon–Lotto	+4' 11"	See #2005 Tour de France
6	Denis Menchov (RUS)	Rabobank	+6' 09"	Client of Michele Ferrari. Disqualified from the 2009, 2010 and 2012 Tours and received a two-year ban for adverse biological passport findings.
7	Cyril Dessel (FRA)	Ag2r	+7' 44"	
8	Christophe Moreau (FRA)	Ag2r	+8' 40"	see #2000 Tour de France
9	Haimar Zubeldia (ESP)	Euskaltel	+11' 08"	
10	Michael Rogers (AUS)	T-Mobile	+14' 10"	Client of Michele Ferrari.

=== 2007 Tour de France ===
Rank	Name	Team	Time	Notes
1	Alberto Contador (ESP)	DSC	91h 00' 26"	see #2010 Tour de France
2	Cadel Evans (AUS)	Predictor–Lotto	+ 23"	See #2005 Tour de France
3	Levi Leipheimer (USA)	DSC	+ 31"	See #2002 Tour de France
4	Carlos Sastre (ESP)	Team CSC	+ 7' 08"	
5	Haimar Zubeldia (ESP)	Euskaltel–Euskadi	+ 8' 17"	
6	Alejandro Valverde (ESP)	Caisse d'Epargne	+ 11' 37"	Convicted in 2009 of EPO use after link to Operación Puerto and handed a two-year ban.
7	Kim Kirchen (LUX)	T-Mobile Team	+ 12' 18"	
8	Yaroslav Popovych (UKR)	Discovery Channel	+ 12' 25"	Client of Michele Ferrari. House raided by police, who found drugs and doping paraphernalia. Scored 10/10 on 2010 leaked UCI list of suspicious riders.
9	Mikel Astarloza (ESP)	Euskaltel–Euskadi	+ 14' 14"	Tested positive for EPO in 2009 and given a two-year ban.
10	Óscar Pereiro (ESP)	Caisse d'Epargne	+ 14' 25"	See #2004 Tour de France

=== 2008 Tour de France ===
Rank	Name	Team	Time	Notes
1	Carlos Sastre (ESP)	Team CSC	87h 52' 52"	
2	Cadel Evans (AUS)	Silence–Lotto	+0' 58"	See #2005 Tour de France
3	Bernhard Kohl (AUT)	Gerolsteiner	DQ	Failed tests for CERA and was disqualified.
4	Denis Menchov (RUS)	Rabobank	+2' 10"	See #2006 Tour de France
5	Christian Vande Velde (USA)	Garmin	+3' 05"	Admitted to using doping on the US Postal team. All results from June 2004 through April 2006 voided.
6	Fränk Schleck (LUX)	Team CSC	+4' 28"	Removed from the 2012 Tour de France after testing positive for diuretic masking agent xipamide. Implicated in the Opération Puerto doping case for transferring 7000 euros into a bank account held by Dr Fuentes.
7	Samuel Sánchez (ESP)	Euskaltel	+6' 25"	Handed a two-year ban after testing positive for growth hormone GHRP-2.
8	Kim Kirchen (LUX)	Team Columbia	+6' 55"	
9	Alejandro Valverde (ESP)	Caisse d'Epargne	+7' 12"	See #2007 Tour de France
10	Tadej Valjavec (SLO)	Ag2r	+9' 05"	Handed a two-year ban for irregular biological passport values.

=== 2009 Tour de France ===
Rank	Name	Team	Time	Notes
1	Alberto Contador (ESP)	Astana	85h 48' 35"	See #2010 Tour de France
2	Andy Schleck (LUX)	Team Saxo Bank	+4' 11"	
3	Lance Armstrong (USA)	Astana	+5' 24"	See #1999 Tour de France
4	Bradley Wiggins (GBR)	Garmin	+6' 01"	Implicated in the Team Sky "Jiffy Bag" Scandal
5	Fränk Schleck (LUX)	Team Saxo Bank	+6' 04"	See #2008 Tour de France
6	Andreas Klöden (GER)	Astana	+6' 42"	See #2004 Tour de France
7	Vincenzo Nibali (ITA)	Liquigas	+7' 35"	
8	Christian Vande Velde (USA)	Garmin	+12' 04"	See #2008 Tour de France
9	Roman Kreuziger (CZE)	Liquigas	+14' 16"	Targeted on the basis of inconsistencies in his biological passport from 2011 to 2012 while part of the Astana Team. Admitted to working with Michele Ferrari.
10	Christophe Le Mével (FRA)	Française des Jeux	+14' 25"	

=== 2010 Tour de France ===
Rank	Name	Team	Time	Notes
1	Alberto Contador (ESP)	Astana	91h 58'48"	Implicated in the Operación Puerto doping case; although his name was removed by prosecutors in 2006. Tested positive for clenbuterol in the 2010 Tour de France and was stripped of his title and given a two-year doping ban.
2	Andy Schleck (LUX)	Team Saxo Bank	+ 39"	
3	Denis Menchov (RUS)	Rabobank	+2' 01"	See #2006 Tour de France
4	Samuel Sánchez (ESP)	Euskaltel	+3' 40"	See #2008 Tour de France
5	Jurgen Van den Broeck (BEL)	Omega Pharma – Lotto	+6' 54"	Implicated in a Belgian blood-doping scandal in 2014.
6	Robert Gesink (NED)	Rabobank	+9' 31"	
7	Ryder Hesjedal (CAN)	Garmin	+10' 15"	Admitted to doping
8	Joaquim Rodríguez (ESP)	Katusha	+11' 37"	
9	Roman Kreuziger (CZE)	Liquigas	+11' 54"	See #2009 Tour de France
10	Chris Horner (USA)	Team Radioshack	+12' 02"	

=== 2011 Tour de France ===
Rank	Name	Team	Time	Notes
1	Cadel Evans (AUS)	BMC Racing Team	86h 12′ 22″	See #2005 Tour de France
2	Andy Schleck (LUX)	Leopard Trek	+ 1′ 34″	
3	Fränk Schleck (LUX)	Leopard Trek	+ 2′ 30″	See #2008 Tour de France
4	Thomas Voeckler (FRA)	Team Europcar	+ 3′ 20″	
5	Samuel Sánchez (ESP)	Euskaltel–Euskadi	+ 4′ 55″	See #2008 Tour de France
6	Damiano Cunego (ITA)	Lampre–ISD	+ 6′ 05″	Indicted but later cleared in the Manitoba doping trial.
7	Ivan Basso (ITA)	Liquigas–Cannondale	+ 7′ 23″	See #2003 Tour de France
8	Tom Danielson (USA)	Garmin–Cervélo	+ 8′ 15″	Admitted to doping on the US Postal team. Banned for six months with all results from March 2005 through 23 September 2006 voided.
9	Jean-Christophe Péraud (FRA)	Ag2r–La Mondiale	+ 10′ 11″	
10	Pierre Rolland (FRA)	Team Europcar	+ 10′ 43″	

=== 2012 Tour de France ===
Rank	Rider	Team	Time	Notes
1	Bradley Wiggins (GBR)	Team Sky	87h 34' 47"	See #2009 Tour de France
2	Chris Froome (GBR)	Team Sky	+ 3' 21″	Adverse analytical finding for salbutamol at the 2017 Vuelta a España. Was later cleared following an investigation.
3	Vincenzo Nibali (ITA)	Liquigas–Cannondale	+ 6' 19″	
4	Jurgen Van den Broeck (BEL)	Lotto–Belisol	+ 10' 15″	See #2010 Tour de France
5	Tejay van Garderen (USA)	BMC Racing Team	+ 11' 04″	
6	Haimar Zubeldia (ESP)	RadioShack–Nissan	+ 15' 41″	
7	Cadel Evans (AUS)	BMC Racing Team	+ 15' 49″	See #2005 Tour de France
8	Pierre Rolland (FRA)	Team Europcar	+ 16' 26″	
9	Janez Brajkovič (SLO)	Astana	+ 16' 33″	Handed a ten-month ban in 2018 for testing positive for methylhexanamine.
10	Thibaut Pinot (FRA)	FDJ–BigMat	+ 17' 17″	

=== 2013 Tour de France ===
Rank	Rider	Team	Time	Notes
1	Chris Froome (GBR)	Team Sky	83h 56' 40"	See #2012 Tour de France
2	Nairo Quintana (COL)	Movistar Team	+ 4' 20"	Retrospectively disqualified from the 2022 Tour de France over detected tramadol usage.
3	Joaquim Rodríguez (ESP)	Team Katusha	+ 5' 04"	
4	Alberto Contador (ESP)	Saxo–Tinkoff	+ 6' 27"	See #2007 Tour de France
5	Roman Kreuziger (CZE)	Saxo–Tinkoff	+ 7' 27"	See #2009 Tour de France
6	Bauke Mollema (NED)	Belkin Pro Cycling	+ 11' 42"	
7	Jakob Fuglsang (DEN)	Astana	+ 12' 17"	Cycling Anti-Doping Federation (CADF) lead an internal investigation, where no links between Fuglsang and banned doctor Michele Ferrari were found. The case was never processed to UCI.
8	Alejandro Valverde (ESP)	Movistar Team	+ 15' 26"	See #2007 Tour de France
9	Daniel Navarro (ESP)	Cofidis	+ 15' 52"	
10	Andrew Talansky (USA)	Garmin–Sharp	+ 17' 39"	

=== 2014 Tour de France ===
Rank	Rider	Team	Time	Notes
1	Vincenzo Nibali (ITA)	Astana	89h 59' 06"	
2	Jean-Christophe Péraud (FRA)	Ag2r–La Mondiale	+ 7' 39"	
3	Thibaut Pinot (FRA)	FDJ.fr	+ 8' 15"	
4	Alejandro Valverde (ESP)	Movistar Team	+ 9' 40"	See #2007 Tour de France
5	Tejay van Garderen (USA)	BMC Racing Team	+ 11' 24"	
6	Romain Bardet (FRA)	Ag2r–La Mondiale	+ 11' 26"	
7	Leopold König (CZE)	NetApp–Endura	+ 14' 32"	
8	Haimar Zubeldia (ESP)	Trek Factory Racing	+ 17' 57"	
9	Laurens ten Dam (NED)	Belkin Pro Cycling	+ 18' 12"	
10	Bauke Mollema (NED)	Belkin Pro Cycling	+ 21' 15"	

=== 2015 Tour de France ===
Rank	Rider	Team	Time	Notes
1	Chris Froome (GBR)	Team Sky	84h 46' 14"	See #2012 Tour de France
2	Nairo Quintana (COL)	Movistar Team	+ 1' 12"	See #2013 Tour de France
3	Alejandro Valverde (ESP)	Movistar Team	+ 5' 25"	See #2007 Tour de France
4	Vincenzo Nibali (ITA)	Astana	+ 8' 36"	
5	Alberto Contador (ESP)	Tinkoff–Saxo	+ 9' 48"	See #2010 Tour de France
6	Robert Gesink (NED)	LottoNL–Jumbo	+ 10' 47"	
7	Bauke Mollema (NED)	Trek Factory Racing	+ 15' 14"	
8	Mathias Frank (SUI)	IAM Cycling	+ 15' 39"	
9	Romain Bardet (FRA)	AG2R La Mondiale	+ 16' 00"	
10	Pierre Rolland (FRA)	Team Europcar	+ 17' 30"	

== See also ==
- Tour de France
- Doping
- List of doping cases in cycling
