= VAM =

VAM may refer to:

== Science and technology ==
- Vinyl acetate monomer, a chemical component used in plastics manufacture
- VAM (bicycling), a measure of rate of climb in bicycle racing
- Vehículos Automotores Mexicanos, a Mexican automaker
- VAM, a trademark of Vallourec Oil and Gas, France
- Virtual Antenna Mapping, a method used in wireless telecom products
- Vesicular Arbuscular Mycorhiza, a kind of fungus/plant symbiosis
- Bedford VAM, British chassis for buses and coaches produced between 1965 and 1985

== Other uses ==
- Value-added modeling, an American method of teacher evaluation
- Victoria and Albert Museum in London
- Violence against men
- Vitt Ariskt Motstånd or White Aryan Resistance (Sweden), a Swedish neo-Nazi group
- Villa International Airport Maamigili (IATA code: VAM)
- VAM (Morgan and Peace dollar die varieties) coin die varieties
- Vanimo language (ISO 639 code: vam)

== See also ==
- VAMM - Virtual atom molecular mechanics, see Force field (chemistry)
