= Doping at the 1999 Tour de France =

Drug test

At the time of the 1999 Tour de France there was no official test for EPO. In August 2005, 60 remaining antidoping samples from the 1998 Tour and 84 remaining antidoping samples given by riders during the 1999 Tour, were tested retrospectively for recombinant EPO by using three recently developed detection methods. More precisely the laboratory compared the result of test method A: "Autoradiography — visual inspection of light emitted from a strip displaying the isoelectric profile for EPO" (published in the Nature journal as the first EPO detection method in June 2000), with the result of test method B: "Percentage of basic isoforms — using an ultra-sensitive camera that by percentage quantify the light intensity emitted from each of the isoelectric bands" (pioneered at the Olympics in September 2000, with values above 80% classified as positive, but the laboratory applying an 85% threshold for retrospective samples — to be absolutely certain that no false-positives can occur when analyzing on samples stored for multiple years). For those samples with enough urine left, these results of test method A+B were finally also compared with the best and latest test method C: "Statistical discriminant analysis — taking account all the band profiles by statistical distinguish calculations for each band" (which feature both higher sensitivity and accuracy compared to test method B).

At first, the rider names with a positive sample in the retrospective test were not made public, because this extra test had only been conducted as scientific research, with the purpose of validating the newest invented EPO-test method based on "statistical discriminant analysis". On 23 August 2005, only one day after the confidential test report had been submitted by the test laboratory LNDD to WADA and the French Ministry for Sports, the French newspaper L'Équipe however reported, that after having access to all Lance Armstrong's Sample IDs, they had managed to link him to 6 out of the 12 "definitely EPO-positive" samples. The phrase "definitely EPO-positive" referred to that all three applied test methods (A+B+C) had returned a positive result, and it was reported Armstrong's six samples satisfying this requirement had been collected on the following dates: 3+4+13+14+16+18 July 1999. From the leaked report it was also possible to conclude, that all of the four unidentified riders tested at the Prologue on top of the list, had submitted samples being EPO positive by all three applied test methods. As it was known from earlier press reports, that only four named riders (Beltran, Castelblanco, Hamburger and Armstrong) had been tested in the Prologue, they were all identified as having tested EPO-positive.

In response, UCI published the so-called Vrijman report in May 2006, where they alleged WADA had been responsible for the leak of the confidential test report to the press, and had been plotting against Lance Armstrong when they asked the French laboratory to note sample IDs in their confidential report, as Vrijman suspected they already had inside knowledge of some journalists being in possession of Armstrongs confidential doping forms — knowing that this all together could be used to link him to the positive samples. However, a few days later, WADA published a full written reply to completely rebut this accusation, and was moreover able to prove the journalist in fact had received the Armstrong doping forms by legal ways, from UCI itself — with Armstrong's written consent — and without any help/interference by WADA.

In July 2013, the antidoping committee of the French Senate decided it would benefit the current doping fight to shed some more light on the past, and so decided — as part of their "Commission of Inquiry into the effectiveness of the fight against doping" report — to publish all of the 1998 rider doping forms and some of the 1999 rider doping forms, along with the result of the retrospective test of the 1998+1999 samples, which made name identification possible for the various sample IDs. This publication revealed for the 1999 samples, that 13 of the 20 positive samples belonged to 6 riders (Lance Armstrong, Kevin Livingston, Manuel Beltrán, José Castelblanco, Bo Hamburger, and Wladimir Belli), with the remaining 7 positive samples still not identified. Beside of the 20 positive samples, 34 were reported to have tested negative, and the remaining 30 samples were inconclusive due to sample degradation.

== Tests ==
34 Negative samples for Recombinant EPO
Sample ID	Date	Rider	Team
185-553	4 July	No ID	N/A
185-558	4 July	No ID	N/A
185-559	4 July	No ID	N/A
185-560	4 July	No ID	N/A
186-581	5/6 July	No ID	N/A
186-582	5/6 July	No ID	N/A
186-587	5/6 July	No ID	N/A
160-292	6/5 July	No ID	N/A
186-590	6/5 July	No ID	N/A
186-075	7 July	No ID	N/A
186-076	7 July	No ID	N/A
186-077	7 July	No ID	N/A
186-079	7 July	Mariano Piccoli (ITA)	Lampre
186-071	10/12 July	No ID	N/A
186-073	10/12 July	No ID	N/A
157-378	9 July	No ID	N/A
157-380	9 July	No ID	N/A
160-296	8 July	Marcos Serrano (ESP)	ONCE
157-376	12/10 July	No ID	N/A
160-291	12/10 July	No ID	N/A
186-078	12/10 July	No ID	N/A
186-080	12/10 July	No ID	N/A
186-396	13 July	No ID	N/A
186-398	13 July	Jörg Jaksche (GER)	Telekom
185-893	14 July	No ID	N/A
186-589	11 July	Andrea Peron (ITA)	ONCE
185-472	16 July	No ID	N/A
185-480	16 July	No ID	N/A
185-478	17 July	No ID	N/A
185-891	18 July	No ID	N/A
185-896	20 July	Abraham Olano (ESP)	ONCE
185-884	22 July	Tom Steels (BEL)	Mapei
185-900	22 July	Lylian Lebreton (FRA)	BigMat–Auber 93
186-358	22 July	Gabriele Colombo (ITA)	Cantina Tollo

20 Positive samples for Recombinant EPO (Note: Unmarked samples were tested positive by all three test methods. Positive samples marked with a *, were only analyzed by the visual inspection test "autoradiography" (referred to as "test method A"), and not by one of the later WADA approved EPO detection test methods (referred to as test method B and C). Positive samples marked with **, were analyzed positive by both test method A+C. The two first samples marked with ***, returned a positive result by all three test methods, and have been identified through the fact that only four riders (Beltran, Castelblanco, Hamburger and Armstrong) were tested on 3 July, while we know from the report plus another source that sample ID 160-297 and 160-300 belong respectively to Armstrong and Hamburger, and thus it can be concluded the two remaining unidentified positives from 3 July belong to Manuel Beltrán and José Castelblanco.)
Sample ID	Date	Rider	Team
157-371 or 160-294***	3 July	Manuel Beltrán (ESP)	Banesto
160-294 or 157-371***	3 July	José Castelblanco (COL)	Kelme
160-297	3 July	Lance Armstrong (USA)	US Postal
160-300	3 July	Bo Hamburger (DEN)	Cantina Tollo
157-372	4 July	Lance Armstrong (USA)	US Postal
186-585**	5/6 July	No ID	N/A
186-586**	5/6 July	No ID	N/A
157-373	9 July	Kevin Livingston (USA)	US Postal
160-293*	12/10 July	No ID	N/A
186-584*	11 July	Lance Armstrong (USA)	US Postal
185-557	13 July	Lance Armstrong (USA)	US Postal
185-894*	13 July	No ID	N/A
185-479	14 July	Lance Armstrong (USA)	US Postal
186-399	14 July	No ID	N/A
185-475	16 July	Lance Armstrong (USA)	US Postal
185-895*	17 July	Lance Armstrong (USA)	US Postal
185-892*	18 July	No ID	N/A
185-898	18 July	No ID	N/A
186-397	18 July	Lance Armstrong (USA)	US Postal
185-555**	20 July	Wladimir Belli (ITA)	Festina–Lotus

== Confessions ==
Among the riders testing EPO positive during the 1999 Tour, the following riders have confessed indeed to be EPO positive:

- Lance Armstrong was in August 2012 – despite not having confessed any guilt yet — given a lifetime ban by USADA for doping with EPO, testosterone and human growth hormones in 1996, and EPO, blood transfusions, testosterone and cortisone throughout 1998–2005, and having a positive indication of "blood manipulation" during his comeback to cycling in the 2009 Tour de France. Beside of being convicted for this long list of possession and use of doping, he was also ruled guilty of trafficking and administration of EPO, testosterone and corticosteroids, along with also — towards his teammates — having assisted, encouraged, aided, abetted and covered up doping use. Along with the lifetime ban, USADA decided, that because Armstrong previously had been lying under oath, then WADA's standard rule about eight years statute of limitations should be disregarded, and thus ruled all his competitive results since 1 August 1998 to be disqualified. Armstrong confessed on 18 January 2013 in a television interview conducted by Oprah Winfrey, that he indeed had doped throughout 1996–2005 (including his seven Tour wins), but denied the allegation of having manipulated his blood during his comeback years in 2009–11.

Among the riders in the race who never had their samples tested doping positive, the following nevertheless later on confessed also to have doped in preparation/during the 1999 Tour de France:

- Michael Boogerd (Rabobank), confessed using cortisone, EPO and blood doping throughout 1997–2007.
- George Hincapie (US Postal), confessed in his affidavit to the USADA that he used EPO and other doping substances throughout 1996–2006 (incl. blood doping throughout 2001–2005). Specifically about the 1999 Tour de France, he confessed using EPO in the preparation weeks ahead of the race, along with testosterone during the race, and testified he knew Tyler Hamilton and Kevin Livingston also used EPO during the race.
- Christian Vande Velde (US Postal), confessed in his affidavit to the USADA to have used doping during the time from January 1999 to April 2006. In 1999 he doped with Actovegin in the spring and testosterone during the Tour de France. In 2000 he doped with growth hormones and cortisone (incl. Synacthen). Throughout 2001–2003 he paid a percentage of his salary to Michele Ferrari, for joining a regular EPO doping program organized via his team, with injection of some modest 500/1000 EPO units in the evening, to ensure he would never test positive, as the doctor had told him it then became undetectable only 12 hours after the injection. After changing team to Liberty Seguros in 2004, he doped regularly with growth hormones and EPO, supplied through his team doctor. When changing team next year to Team CSC there was no team organized doping, but nevertheless he opted at his own initiative a single time to use testosterone. Since April 2006, he however had always competed entirely clean in all races.
- Erik Zabel (Telekom), admitted having doped with cortisone, "magic potion" (caffeine+Persantine+Alupent), painkillers and EPO, throughout 1996–2002. In 2003 he used the same doping substances, but replaced EPO with autologous blood doping ahead of the Tour de France. For the years 2004–2005, he wanted to race clean and did not take any doping substances, except for the "magic potion", which he claim at that point of time not knowing the exact content of. After changing team from Telekom to Milram, he always competed entirely clean in the remaining part of his career, stretching from 2006 to 2008. Explicitly about his EPO abuse in the Tour de France, he explained he abused it both during the Tour and in the 2-3 week preparation phase ahead, in 1997 and 1998. For the years in 1996 and 1999–2002 his EPO abuse did not happen during the race, but was limited to the 2-3 week preparation phase ahead of the Tour. When he blood doped in 2003, this also took place shortly ahead of the Tour start, and not during the race.

== Christophe Bassons ==
French rider Christophe Bassons had come to be known as one of the few riders of the Festina scandal who was not doping. During the 1999 tour he wrote some articles about cycling, the tour, and about doping, finding the speeds to be "suspicious". The peloton began to turn against him, refusing to speak to him, and otherwise shunning him.

Stage 10 occurred on July 14 and was from Sestrieres to Alpe d'Huez. Bassons would later tell the story of this stage to media, including an October 2012 interview with the BBC. He said that nobody had been talking to him. The entire peloton planned to ride slow for the first 100 km without telling him. Bassons only heard about this because a mechanic from his team told him. Bassons decided he was "fed up" and decided to ride ahead of the others ("attacked from the start"). As they came to a flat spot, "all of the teams rode together to close me down". As the teams rode by him, they looked at him.

" . . . and then Lance Armstrong reached me. He grabbed me by the shoulder, because he knew that everyone would be watching, and he knew that at that moment, he could show everyone that he was the boss. He stopped me, and he said what I was saying wasn't true, what I was saying was bad for cycling, that I mustn't say it, that I had no right to be a professional cyclist, that I should quit cycling, that I should quit the tour, and finished by saying [*beep*] you. . . . I was depressed for 6 months. I was crying all of the time. I was in a really bad way." – Bassons, on BBC Radio 5, 2012 10 15

In 2011/2012, after investigations into past doping in cycling, especially the 2012 USADA report on Armstrong's US Postal Service team, the media began to re-tell Bassons story. In one interview for the BBC, Armstrong teammate Tyler Hamilton publicly apologized for being part of the peloton that shunned him, saying that he was "100% wrong" not to talk to him. Bassons said "that's life, it's nothing. I don't begrudge Hamilton. I understand."

David Walsh would later claim that Armstrong's treatment of Bassons was what first raised doubts about Armstrong in his mind. These doubts culminated in the 2004 book L. A. Confidentiel which he co-wrote with Pierre Ballester. It contained testimony from Emma O'Reilly (US Postal soigneur) and others about Armstrong's alleged doping, including during the 1999 tour.
