= Conconi =

Conconi is a surname. Notable people with the surname include:

- Francesco Conconi (born 1935), Italian sports doctor and scientist
- Luigi Conconi (1852–1917), Italian painter
- Mauro Conconi (1815–1860), Italian painter

== See also ==
- Conconi test, a test to measure a person's maximum anaerobic and aerobic threshold heart rates
