= Operación Puerto doping case =

Spanish professional sports doping investigation

Operación Puerto (Operation Mountain Pass) is the code name of a Spanish Police operation against the pro sports doping network of Doctor Eufemiano Fuentes. It started in May 2006, which resulted in a scandal that involved several of the world's most famous cyclists and teams at the time.

Media attention has focused on the small number of professional road cyclists named; however, sports people from other disciplines including football and tennis have also been connected with the scandal, although they were not officially indicted. Among the total number of athletes, fifteen had been acquitted by May 2007, while three had admitted doping or evidence of blood doping was found. The case was closed in 2019.

== Timeline ==
=== Revelations by Jesús Manzano ===
In March 2004 in an interview with the Spanish newspaper Diario AS, Jesús Manzano exposed systematic doping in his former cycling team, Kelme. He detailed blood doping as well as the performance-enhancing drugs he used while on the team. The investigation and the allegations he made led to questioning of several members of the team in April 2004. These included Eufemiano Fuentes who was the Kelme team doctor, Walter Virú the doctor before Fuentes, and Alfredo Córdova who was working for Liberty Seguros–Würth but involved with Kelme in 2003. An investigation began into the practices of Fuentes in early 2006 by the anti-drug trafficking arm of the Spanish Guardia Civil.

=== Police action ===
On 23 May 2006, Guardia Civil arrested the directeur sportif of the Liberty Seguros–Würth team, Manolo Saiz, and four others including Fuentes, accused of doping practices with riders. Spanish police raided residences. In one, belonging to Fuentes, they found a thousand doses of anabolic steroids, 100 packets of blood products, and machines to manipulate and transfuse them. The Guardia Civil found a list naming other cyclists involved. Liberty Seguros withdrew their sponsorship, which left Würth as sole sponsor.

=== Suspensions ===
As more names leaked to the press, T-Mobile Team asked riders to sign a statement that they had never worked with Fuentes, while the Phonak team suspended Santiago Botero and José Enrique Gutiérrez, who had finished second in the 2006 Giro d'Italia. Tour de France organisers ASO considered withdrawing invitations to Würth and Comunidad Valenciana. On 1 June, the director of Valenciana, José Ignacio Labarta, resigned.

Würth found a new sponsor, five Kazakh companies united under the name of the capital, Astana, and became Astana-Würth. ASO withdrew Comunitat Valenciana's invitation, moving riders to send blood samples to be analysed to prove their innocence. The Vuelta a España considered expelling the team.

After El País published details of Operación Puerto, Spanish riders boycotted the Spanish National Road Race Championships, which was cancelled after 500 metres. ASO wrote asking Astana-Würth not to take part in the Tour de France, which the team ignored. Jan Ullrich, linked to Fuentes by the newspaper, threatened to sue El País.

The Court of Arbitration for Sport (CAS) said Astana-Würth were to be accepted in the Tour. The Spanish authorities lifted the secret of summary two days before the start of the 2006 Tour, formally involving all 56 riders found in Fuentes' lists.

Because Ullrich and Óscar Sevilla were in the lists, T-Mobile suspended them. The example was followed by Ivan Basso's Team CSC and Francisco Mancebo's AG2R Prévoyance. ASO demanded all riders involved be withdrawn by their teams, even though Astana-Würth had received the support of the CAS.

The day before the Tour, Astana-Würth yielded to pressure. Five of their riders had been excluded by ASO for involvement in the scandal, leaving only four of the six riders required. Francisco Mancebo, fourth the previous year and involved in the case, ended his career, according to his directeur sportif Vincent Lavenu. As a result, none of the riders who finished in the top 5 of the 2005 Tour de France started in the 2006 edition.

On 3 July, Würth also withdrew sponsorship of the Astana team. They had planned sponsorship only if it were not excluded from a race.

Six days later, T-Mobile fired Rudy Pevenage, directeur sportif, because he was also involved. On 21 July, the team suspended Ullrich and Sevilla, effectively sacking them. On the same day, Spanish cycling newspaper Meta2Mil listed codenames used by Fuentes which had not been deciphered by police.

=== Additional leaks ===
In November 2006, El Mundo claimed that an anti-doping laboratory in Barcelona which analyzed 99 bags of blood plasma seized in Operación Puerto found "high levels of erythropoietin (EPO)". This suggested athletes working with Fuentes had been boosting their performance in ways other than blood doping. El Mundo suggested those implicated had delegated their cheating to Fuentes, and would not have been able to control the level of EPO they were taking.

After studying the Barcelona lab's report, El Mundo described Fuentes's program as: riders would visit Fuentes a few weeks before a race and have blood removed. Fuentes would run the blood through a centrifuge, separating the blood plasma from the red blood cells. The cells would be re-injected shortly before competition, boosting resistance to fatigue. If haematocrit levels (volume of red blood cells) got dangerously high, they would re-inject plasma as well, enhanced with EPO, to dilute the red blood cells and avoid detection.

The Barcelona lab did not identify any athlete responsible for any of the 99 tested bags of blood.

=== Legal repercussions ===
On 26 July 2006, five Astana riders were cleared by Spanish courts. The five – Joseba Beloki, Isidro Nozal, Sérgio Paulinho, Allan Davis and Alberto Contador – received a document clearing them of links to Operación Puerto, the Spanish newspaper El Diario Vasco reported.

On 8 October, the Madrid court in charge of the case told the Spanish cycling federation, the Real Federación Española de Ciclismo (RFEC), that court documents could not be used in the federation's investigations.

On 13 October, Ivan Basso was cleared by Italian authorities due to lack of evidence. Ullrich was cleared by the Spanish courts on 25 October. The judge ruled that Ullrich and Basso were put under investigation without proof of involvement.

On 28 October, the RFEC closed disciplinary files against cyclists in the investigation. However, the RFEC will initiate disciplinary investigations on Manolo Sáiz. UCI president Pat McQuaid was reported to feel let down by authorities in Spain. He hoped teams would require cyclists to submit DNA samples to clear their names. The investigations into Spanish riders were suspended. On 7 March 2007, the case was dropped through lack of evidence of crime.

=== Admissions and evidence of doping ===
On 3 April 2007, the German news agency sid said nine bags of blood marked Jan, number 1 or Hijo Rudicio (Son of Rudy) matched Jan Ullrich's saliva DNA. On 7 May, Basso admitted involvement with the scandal to the Italian National Olympic Committee (CONI). On 9 May, Michele Scarponi admitted he was Zapatero in Fuentes' files. And on 30 June, Jörg Jaksche admitted he was Bella.

=== Trial ===
In January 2013, the Operacion Puerto trial went underway, and Eufemiano Fuentes offered to reveal the names of all the athletes who were his clients. Julia Santamaria, the judge presiding the trial, told Fuentes that he was not under obligations to name any athlete other than the cyclists implicated. Fuentes stated that he supplied athletes in other sports with drugs and said: "I could identify all the samples [of blood]. If you give me a list I could tell you who corresponds to each code on the [blood] packs."

On the 30 April 2013 Fuentes was found guilty and given a one-year suspended prison sentence. The judge also ruled on a request to hand over blood bags to the Spanish Anti-Doping Agency. The judge ordered the blood bags destroyed, but the anti-doping agency has appealed. Additional appeals were filed by the Union Cycliste Internationale, the Italian National Olympic Committee and the World Anti-Doping Agency (WADA), as well as by the prosecution. On 14 June 2016, the original verdict against Fuentes was overruled and he was cleared of all charges. However, 211 blood bags from his laboratory are set to be handed over to anti-doping authorities for investigation. />In 2019, WADA announced that its tests on the bags have led to the identification of 11 athletes, but stated that it was not allowed to identify them.

== List of athletes named ==
According to the Guardia Civil, the following athletes have been named.

=== Cyclists ===
==== Teams ====
Astana–Würth
- Alberto Contador – removed from the case by Spanish courts (26 July 2006).
- Allan Davis – removed from the case by Spanish courts (26 July 2006), investigation closed by the Australian Sports Anti-Doping Authority (14 December).
- Joseba Beloki – removed from the case by Spanish courts (26 July 2006).
- David Etxebarría
- Isidro Nozal – removed from the case by Spanish courts (26 July 2006).
- Unai Osa
- Sérgio Paulinho – removed from the case by Spanish courts (26 July 2006).
- Michele Scarponi – admitted he is Zapatero in Fuentes' files. Scarponi was suspended on 16 May 2007.
- Marcos Serrano
- Ángel Vicioso

Comunidad Valenciana
- Vicente Ballester – removed from the case by Spanish courts (28 July 2006).
- David Bernabeu – removed from the case by Spanish courts (28 July 2006).
- David Blanco – removed from the case by Spanish courts (28 July 2006).
- José Adrián Bonilla – removed from the case by Spanish courts (28 July 2006).
- Juan Gomis – removed from the case by Spanish courts (28 July 2006).
- Eladio Jiménez – removed from the case by Spanish courts (28 July 2006).
- David Latasa – removed from the case by Spanish courts (28 July 2006).
- Javier Pascual Rodríguez – removed from the case by Spanish courts (28 July 2006).
- Rubén Plaza – removed from the case by Spanish courts (28 July 2006).

==== Others in the cycling world ====
AG2R Prévoyance
- Francisco Mancebo – initially retired from cycling, but having severed ties with AG2R, joined Spanish professional continental team Relax–GAM. In 2009 he raced with USA-based Rock Racing.

Caisse d'Epargne-Illes Balears
- Constantino Zaballa
- Alejandro Valverde – the source of blood marked VALV.(PITI) (Piti being believed to be the name of Valverde's dog at the time). Valverde was suspended from racing in Italy from May 2009, and in May 2010 a two year suspension, backdated to 1 January 2010, was applied.

Team CSC
- Ivan Basso – Basso's contract with CSC was terminated by mutual agreement on 18 October 2006. On 27 October 2006 the case was dropped by the Federazione Ciclistica Italiana due to lack of evidence, and he was then employed in December 2006 by Discovery Channel. On 24 April 2007 Basso was suspended by Discovery Channel when the Italian National Olympic Committee (CONI) reopened his case. On 1 May 2007 Basso requested to be released from his Discovery Channel contract. This was granted. Basso attended a hearing on 2 May, and on 7 May 2007, admitted that he was Birillo. Basso was suspended on 16 May 2007.
- Fränk Schleck – Schleck admitted transferring nearly 7000 euros to a bank account held by Dr. Fuentes, but denied any doping or personal contact with Fuentes.

Phonak Hearing Systems
- José Ignacio Gutiérrez
- José Enrique Gutiérrez
- Santiago Botero – case dropped by disciplinary committee of the Federación Colombiana de Ciclismo (2 October 2006).

Rabobank
- Thomas Dekker – confirmed he was codename "Classicomano Luigi" (number 24). A reference to cycling coach Luigi Cecchini

Saunier Duval–Prodir
- Carlos Zárate
- Koldo Gil

T-Mobile Team
- Óscar Sevilla – codename Sevillano.
- Jan Ullrich – DNA tests confirmed that the 9 bags that were marked Jan, number 1 or Hijo Rudicio (Son of Rudy) all contained Jan Ullrich's blood. An alleged doping plan was published in the newspaper, Süddeutsche Zeitung, where Ullrich's suspected doping during the first week of the 2005 Tour de France was described. In 2013, Ullrich admitted to cooperating with Dr. Fuentes, saying it was a mistake.

Tinkoff Credit Systems
- Tyler Hamilton – at the time of the initial investigation, Hamilton was suspended for a prior doping offence. Politiken, a Danish newspaper, published details of alleged doping diary of Hamilton during the 2003 season when he rode for Team CSC. It described intake of EPO, growth hormones, testosterone and insulin on 114 days during the 200-day season of 2003. According to allegations originally published in El País, Hamilton is to have paid over €43,000 to Fuentes and that in 2003 Hamilton took erythropoietin, blood transfusions, growth hormone, a hormone taken by menopausal women and anabolic steroids.
- Jörg Jaksche – at the time of the initial investigation, Jaksche rode for Astana-Würth. On 30 June 2007, Jaksche admitted to Der Spiegel that he used Fuentes' services. He said that he was Bella, or number 20. Jaksche had been under suspension by Tinkoff Credit Systems since May.

Unibet
- Carlos García Quesada

==== Already retired or suspended ====
- Michele Bartoli – on 25 May 2007 La Gazzetta dello Sport reported that Bartoli was connected to Fuentes with the code name Sansone. Bartoli has not commented on this accusation.
- Ángel Casero
- Roberto Heras
- Santiago Pérez
- Marco Pantani (deceased) Corriere della Sera reported that Pantani was connected to Fuentes with the code name PTNI in 2003.
- Mario Cipollini, Fuentes' codename "Maria", according to the Gazzetta dello Sport.

=== Other athletes ===
On 5 July 2006, Fuentes was indignant that only cyclists had been named and said he also worked with tennis and football players. On 27 July 2006, IAAF was assured by Spanish prosecutors that no track and field athletes were involved. On 23 September 2006, former cyclist Jesús Manzano told reporters from France 3 that he had seen "well-known footballers" from La Liga visit the offices of Dr Fuentes.

In May 2007 Sepp Blatter, president of FIFA, at a World Anti-Doping Agency meeting in Montreal, was reportedly interested in the contents "of the Puerto file". Le Monde had reported in December 2006 that they had possession of documents of Fuentes detailing "seasonal preparation plans" for Spanish football clubs FC Barcelona and Real Madrid. These plans did not specifically name any players. No other athletes had been named.

It had also been discovered that Fuentes received over €327,000 annually from Real Sociedad. The documentation of the doctor also contained the inscriptions "RSOC" a couple of times and "Cuentas [bills] Asti" which most probably stands for Astiazarán, president of the club from 2001 to 2005. In the 2002–03 La Liga season Real Sociedad finished second in the Spanish League, missing the championship by two points.
