= Michele Ferrari =

Italian cyclist, coach, and author

- Born: 26 March 1953 (age 73); Ferrara, Emilia-Romagna, Italy
- Education: University of Ferrara
- Occupations: Physician, cycling coach, author
- Known for: Committing numerous anti-doping violations

Michele Ferrari is an Italian physician, cycling coach and author, who is mostly known for his role in supplying bicycle racers with performance-enhancing drugs, notably EPO. His most famous client was Lance Armstrong.

== Biography ==
Ferrari was born in Ferrara, Emilia-Romagna, Italy, on 26 March 1953, where he still lives.

In 1978, he obtained his degree in Medicine and Surgery at the University of Ferrara. His doctoral thesis concerned the measurement of anaerobic threshold in the sport of running.

Ferrari was a consultant to the Italian Track and Field Federation (FIDAL) from 1977 to 1980. He became a specialist in sports medicine at the Sapienza University of Rome in 1981. He was a co-author of more than 20 papers in journals of sports physiology. He studied parameters of athletes in a variety of sports, such as track and field, cycling, swimming, skiing, and speed skating. Subsequently, until 1983, he was the sports physician of the Italian National Biathlon team (FISI).

Eventually, he settled on his lifelong interest: the development of training programmes for professional cyclists. One of Ferrari's earliest successes was coaching Francesco Moser to achieve the hour record in 1984, crushing Eddy Merckx's mark by more than a mile.

Initially, Ferrari worked with Professor Francesco Conconi at the University of Ferrara, who developed testing techniques for human performance, using methods such as monitoring the heart rate during exercise and recovery. Another controversial Italian doctor, Luigi Cecchini, is their common disciple.

From 1984 onwards, Ferrari achieved extraordinary improvements in the fitness of many cyclists. Ferrari popularised the use of VAM, a parameter now used in cycling as a measure of fitness and speed.

=== Cycling team doctor and increasing prominence ===
In 1994, Ferrari was the team doctor for Gewiss. The team had an excellent season, winning many races. In the Flèche Wallonne, the team realized a historic triple victory. Concerned by the domination of the Italian team, some observers pointed a finger of suspicion at the team doctor. Far from calming this controversy, Ferrari compared erythropoietin to orange juice. "EPO is not dangerous, it's the abuse that is. It's also dangerous to drink 10 liters of orange juice". This statement cost him his job as team physician. But his reputation was made, and his name thereafter was associated with the use of EPO in particular. In 1995, Ferrari started his own private medical practice.

=== Clientele ===
Professional bicycle racers who were clients, in some capacity, of Ferrari include: Lance Armstrong, Michael Rogers, Alexander Vinokourov, Michele Scarponi, Denis Menchov, Giovanni Visconti, Yaroslav Popovych, Alessandro Bertolini, Gianluca Bortolami, Gianni Bugno, Mario Cipollini, Claudio Chiappucci, Roman Kreuziger, Armand de Las Cuevas, Fernando Escartín, Gianni Faresin, Giorgio Furlan, Ivan Gotti, Andreas Kappes, Kevin Livingston, Eddy Mazzoleni, Axel Merckx, Thomas Dekker, Abraham Olano, Daniele Pontoni, Tony Rominger, Paolo Savoldelli, Filippo Simeoni, Pavel Tonkov, Enrico Zaina and Beat Zberg.

Perhaps the most famous athlete to have been coached or advised by Ferrari is Lance Armstrong. Ferrari claims they were introduced to each other by Eddy Merckx in 1995. Earlier that year, Armstrong had begun doping. Ferrari was involved with the US Postal Service Cycling Team until October 2004, helping Armstrong train during several of his seven consecutive Tour de France victories. Tyler Hamilton, Armstrong's teammate who later confessed to doping, worked with Ferrari for one year, according to his own account in a television interview.

=== Sporting fraud trial ===
In October 2004, Ferrari was sentenced to one year's prison (suspended) and a fine of 900 euros, for sporting fraud and abusive exercise of the profession of pharmacist. Ferrari's conviction in Italian court was based partly on testimony from Italian bicycle racer Filippo Simeoni. Admitting he had been doped since 1993, Simeoni told how he became affiliated with Ferrari in 1996. Simeoni testified that, in addition to a prescription of EPO hormone, "we spoke about Andriol (testosterone), which I was to use after hard training sessions, with the aim of increasing my muscular power. Dr. Ferrari recommended I use Emagel the morning before controls, and another product to decrease my hematocrit." Ferrari argued, in his defence: "Andriol is easily detectable for several days in a normal urine test, so, it is impossible that I suggested he take one Andriol 20 hours before another race."

Lance Armstrong responded to Ferrari's guilty verdict for malpractice in the Italian Court case:

"I was disappointed to learn of the Italian court's judgment against Dr. Michele Ferrari. Dr. Ferrari has been a longtime friend and trusted adviser to me and the USPS team, during which time he never suggested, prescribed or provided me with any performance-enhancing drugs... However, I have always said that I have zero tolerance for anyone convicted of using or facilitating the use of performance-enhancing drugs. As a result of today's developments, the USPS team and I have suspended our professional affiliation with Dr. Ferrari as we await the release of the full verdict..."

Ferrari then announced his intention to appeal his sentence. Ferrari was acquitted of all charges against him on 27 May 2006, because, according to the court, "the facts do not exist" to support the charges.

=== 2012 USADA indictment and lifetime ban ===
On 13 June 2012, Ferrari was officially charged by USADA with administration and trafficking of prohibited substances. As Ferrari did not formally contest this indictment, he was issued a lifetime ban from professional sport in July 2012. In December 2012, Ferrari still protested his innocence in an interview with Al Jazeera. He notably stated about Lance Armstrong in that interview: “So, either he was clean – and in my opinion, he was clean and he says he was clean – or the tests are not powerful,” Ferrari added, before laughing: “Or the UCI was corrupt.” In January 2013, after Lance Armstrong had confessed to using PEDs, Ferrari claimed on his blog that the cyclist could have achieved similar blood values and performance with altitude training.

=== 2013 revelation ===
In November 2013, Armstrong settled a lawsuit with Acceptance Insurance Company (AIC). AIC had sought to recover $3 million it had paid Armstrong as bonuses for winning the Tour de France from 1999–2001. The suit was settled for an undisclosed sum one day before Armstrong was scheduled to give a deposition under oath. In written testimony for the suit, Armstrong admitted under oath that Ferrari had been one of four individuals who had supplied him with PEDs during his cycling career.
