= Francesco Conconi =

Italian sports doctor

Francesco Conconi (born 19 April 1935) is an Italian sports doctor and scientist, with disciples such as Michele Ferrari and Luigi Cecchini. Conconi is a professor at the University of Ferrara in Italy, where he heads the Centro Studi Biomedici Applicati allo Sport or Biomedical Research Institute. His research focused on tracing techniques for doping substances, but he is better known for his doping activities and is said to have introduced Erythropoietin or EPO to the sport of cycling. Conconi is most famous for having prepared Francesco Moser for his successful attempt to break the world hour record in Mexico, 1984.

== History ==
Born in Como, Italy, it was on 14 August 1980 that Conconi submitted a proposal to the Italian National Olympic Committee (CONI) proposing that selected Italian athletes be assisted by the staff of the university to improve their performance. Conconi proposed that he help athletes in the sports of cycling, canoeing, rowing, long-distance skiing, speed skating, swimming and wrestling. CONI accepted the offer. According to Sandro Donati, a coach of the middle distance running team from 1981 onwards, this method of preparation was blood doping. Professor Conconi approached Donati regarding improving the performances of his athletes with estimations of the improvements at 3 to 5 seconds for 1,500 metre races, 15 to 20 seconds for 5,000 metre races and 30 to 40 seconds for 10,000 metre races. There was a partnership between the Olympic Committee and Professor Conconi's biomedical research centre at the University of Ferrara and the Olympic Committee financed his research. According to Donati, Professor Conconi together with the Italian Athletics Federation and a major Italian Research Institute administered testosterone and anabolic steroids to athletes for events in the 1980s. Over several years, CONI funded the research of Conconi with over two million euros. The work of Conconi and his many assistants at the Ferrara University produced great results in sport. In the 1992 and 1994 Winter Olympics, Italy won 34 medals. Many of the athletes had hematocrit levels of over 50%.

=== Conconi test and Francesco Moser ===
Conconi, together with his assistant,s including Michele Ferrari, prepared Francesco Moser in his attempt to break the World Hour Record in January 1984. Conconi theorized that heart rate could be correlated with perceived exertion in order to allow Moser to cycle at the absolute maximum of his capability. Conconi found a point at which aerobic efficiency was overcome by the accumulation of lactic acid. At this "threshold" level, the ability of the athlete to sustain a maximum effort would be compromised. Conconi then set about developing a method to extend the "Anaerobic Threshold." Conconi developed The Conconi test, which is also known as the ramp test, which measures heart rate at different predefined intensity levels. The Conconi Point is the point of maximal steady state or maximum heart rate a subject can have. Professor Conconi was a great innovator in sports science and in his preparation of Moser. This preparation included blood doping, as Moser would later admit. Conconi wrote a book about preparing Moser called Moser's Hour Records: A Human and Scientific Adventure (ISBN 9780941950268) in 1991. Ten years after breaking the Hour record, Conconi coached Moser to attempt to break the record a second time. This idea came from a gentleman's bet between the two to see if Moser, under the guidance of Conconi, would be able to break his 1984 record ten years later. Moser was 43 years of age when he rode 51.840 kilometres in 60 minutes, thereby riding 689 metres beyond his record set in 1984.

=== Introduction of EPO to cycling ===
At the Winter Olympics in 1994 in Lillehammer, Conconi gave a talk to members of the International Olympic Committee (IOC) and informed them about his work on an EPO test. He described how he had carried out controlled experiments with 23 amateur triathletes and other athletes with EPO treatments, but that he had not come up with a test to detect EPO use. The details of Conconi's subjects were later discovered by police after a raid at the University of Ferrara and revealed to be not amateurs but elite professionals, six of whom were from the Carrera Jeans–Tassoni cycling team.

Conconi had listed subjects' names, gender, sport, date of analysis, as well as whether or not they were treated with EPO. Despite funding by CONI and the IOC to come up with an EPO detection test, Conconi was using the money to buy the drug and then administered it to athletes who were also paying Conconi. Conconi is said to have made a technique to balance EPO, Blood Thinner and Human Growth Hormone in a mixture that Athletes could take safely and pass doping tests without testing positive. With this ability to safely take EPO, Donati estimated that 60 to 70% of the peloton used EPO in the mid-1990s.

The team doctor of the Carrera cycling team, Dr. Giovanni Grazzi, worked with Conconi at the university in 1993 while the following year, 1994, another professional cycling team, Gewiss–Ballan, were connected to Conconi via doctors Michele Ferrari and Ilario Casoni. In addition, a number of well-known cycling stars were clients of the Institute. The Gewiss team attracted a lot of negative attention when, after taking the whole podium in the La Flèche Wallonne Classic in 1994, Ferrari, in an interview with the French sports newspaper L'Équipe, was critical of the drug. He claimed that EPO had no "fundamental" effect on performance and that if a rider used it wouldn't "scandalize" himself. He also claimed EPO was not dangerous, only the abuse of it was dangerous, saying, "It's also dangerous to drink 10 litres of orange juice." The 'orange juice' comment has been widely misquoted. Bjarne Riis the 1996 Tour de France winner was a rider of the Gewiss team and was treated with EPO in 1994 and 1995 in Conconi's Institute in Ferrara. During the 1996 season, Riis was coached with one of Conconi's assistants Cecchini and would win the Tour de France.

It would be reported in the Rome-based newspaper, La Repubblica, in January 2000 that Conconi was involved with administering EPO to riders on the Carrera. In March 2000 the Italian Judge Franca Oliva published a report detailing the conclusions of an investigation into a number of sports doctors including Professor Conconi. This official judicial investigation concluded that the riders of the Carrera team were administered EPO in 1993. The riders included Stephen Roche, Claudio Chiappucci, Guido Bontempi, Rolf Sørensen, Mario Chiesa, Massimo Ghirotto and Fabio Roscioli.

Files seized as part of the judicial investigation allegedly detail a number of aliases for former Tour de France, Giro d'Italia winner and World Champion Stephen Roche including Rocchi, Rossi, Rocca, Roncati, Righi and Rossini.

In 1997, Claudio Chiappucci told prosecutor Vincenzo Scolastico that he had been using EPO since 1993, but later he recalled that statement. Marco Pantani was part of the Carrera Jeans–Tassoni team and his hematocrit level displayed rises and falls which looked very suspicious. On 18 October 1995, Pantani was taken to hospital after an accident in the Milano–Torino race, where his hematocrit percentage of 60.1% whereas in the previous June it had been 45%. At this time, there was no limit to the hematocrit level but the large fluctuation was suspicious.

== Appointment to Medical Committee of CONI ==
Alexandre de Merode, a former President of the IOC's Medical Committee, appointed Conconi as a member of the medical committee and funded Conconi's alleged research into a test to detect the use of EPO. During this time, the President of CONI from 1993 to 1998, Dr. Mario Pescante, suppressed a report by Donati which indicated Conconi's involvement in doping.

== Investigations ==
In 1999, the investigations into the doping activities of Conconi began. About twenty doctors and researchers from Conconi's biomedical research centre were under investigation. In an investigation in front of Judge Piero Messini D'Agostini, two haematologists submitted a report in which they concluded that the blood values of athletes treated by Conconi indicated doping. In 2000, Italian public prosecutor Pierguido Soprani alleged that Conconi drugged himself. This was because Conconi, at the age of 59, recorded a hematocrit value of 57% while competing in a mountain bike race on 3 September 1994. Computer files of Conconi that were seized in the investigation were later reported in the press. These files were for patients of Conconi and included Ivan Gotti, Pavel Tonkov, Abraham Olano, Marco Pantani, Tony Rominger, Gianluca Bortolami and Giorgio Furlan. These files showed hematocrit variations in individuals during treatments. Tonkov's hematocrit went from 51.5% in June 1996 to 40.9% in September. Ivan Gotti's hematocrit went from 35.2% in January 1997 to 50.7% in June 1998. Marco Pantani's level went from 40.7 in March 1994 to 58% in June and July 1994. During the 1995 Tour de France, Pantani had a level of 56% and after his accident in Milano–Torino, it was 60%. Claudio Chiappucci had a hematocrit level of 35% in January 1994 to 60% in June 1994 after he came fifth in the 1994 Giro d'Italia.

In 2004, Judge Oliva alleged that the athletes treated at the Institute indeed had taken EPO during the 1993 season but due to the statute of limitations, none would be prosecuted. The Judge found Conconi 'morally guilty'. The judge had looked at medical reports of 33 cyclists in the period 1993-1995, including Chiappucci's, and all blood tests showed largely fluctuating hematocrit-values, indicative for EPO-use.

== Assistants at the Biomedical Research Centre at Ferrara University ==
Conconi had many assistants (doctors and researchers) with whom he performed his tests. Several of these would be charged in connection with doping activities or would continue working as sports scientists after leaving the Institute. The most well-known is Michele Ferrari, who worked with Conconi during the 1980s until the mid-1990s.

- Ilario Casoni
- Luigi Cecchini
- Michele Ferrari
- Giovanni Grazzi
- Gianni Mazzoni
- Carlo Santuccione

== List of racers ==
He took care of some well-known pro cyclists, although only a few of them have actually been found guilty of doping offences. A possible cause is the gap between the development of doping and the means to trace its use in sportsmen. However, in the light of recent revelations, this list may well point in the direction of certain medicinal networks, notably in Italy, but not of proven doping networks.

=== Clients of Conconi, Casoni, and Grazzi ===
- Guido Bontempi
- Maurizio Fondriest, 1988 World Champion

=== Clients of Conconi and Casoni ===
- Marco Albarello
- Eugeni Berzin, winner of the 1994 Giro d'Italia
- Vladislav Bobrik
- Bruno Cenghialta
- Maurilio De Zolt
- Manuela Di Centa
- Silvio Fauner
- Francesco Frattini
- Giorgio Furlan, winner of the 1994 Milan–San Remo
- Ivan Gotti, winner of the 1997 Giro d'Italia
- Nicola Minali
- Gianfranco Polvara
- Mauro-Antonio Santaromita
- Piotr Ugrumov
- Giorgio Vanzetta
- Alberto Volpi

=== Clients of Conconi and Grazzi ===
- Stefano Checchin
- Claudio Chiappucci
- Mario Chiesa
- Massimo Ghirotto
- Marco Pantani, winner of 1998 Tour de France
- Vladimir Poulnikov
- Stephen Roche, winner of 1987 Tour de France
- Fabio Roscioli
- Marcello Siboni
- Rolf Sørensen
- Enrico Zaina

=== Clients of Conconi ===
- Gianni Bugno, former World Champion and Giro d'Italia winner
- Maurizio Damilano
- Luigi Della Bianc
- Emma Scaunich
- Mario Cipollini, former world champion
- Laurent Fignon, Tour de France winner
- Francesco Moser
- Denis Zanette, died suspiciously at the dentist's

== See also ==
- Conconi test
