= Thomas Dekker (cyclist) =

Dutch road bicycle racer

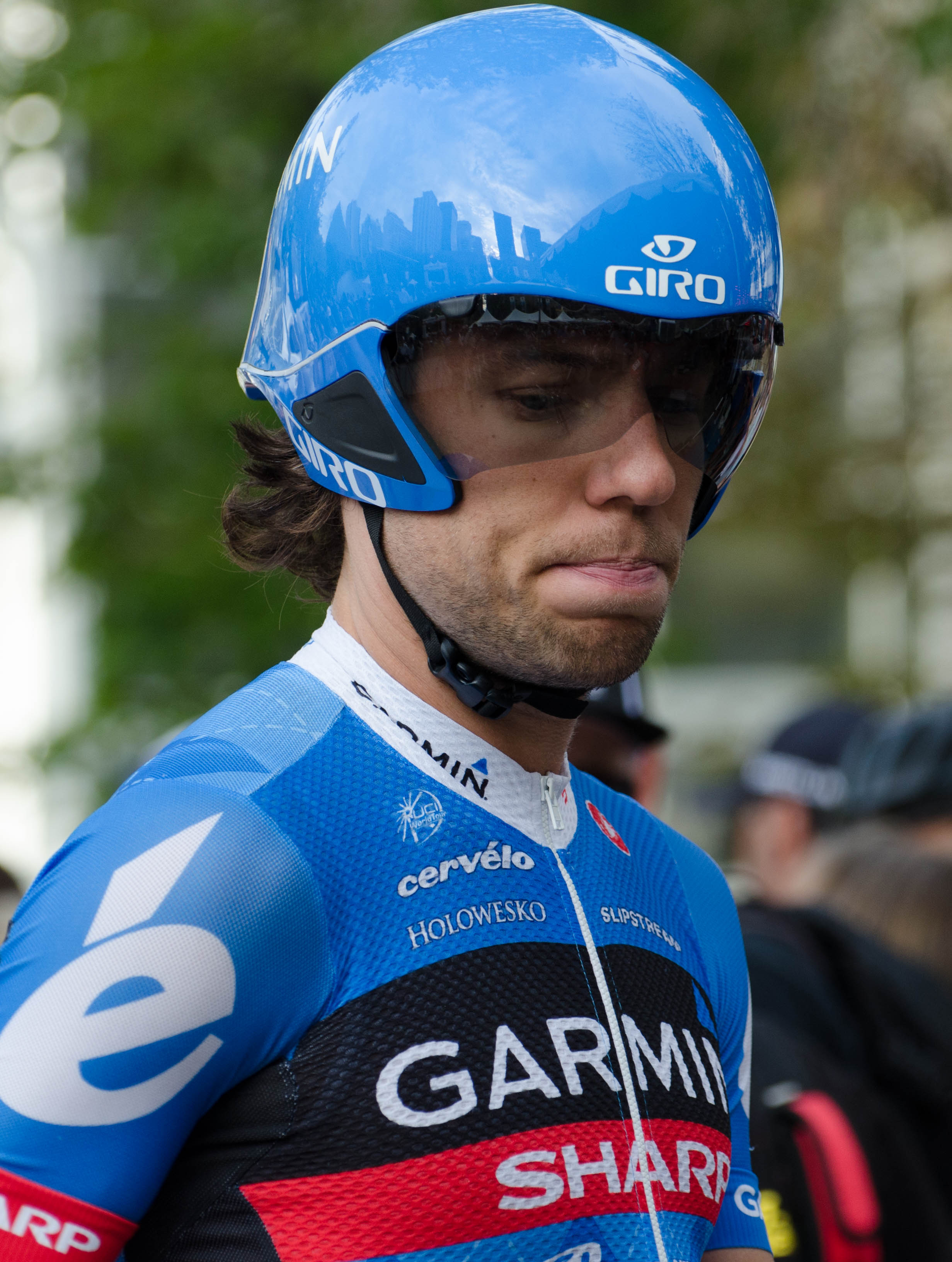
- Dekker at the 2013 Tour of Alberta

Personal information
- Full name: Thomas Dekker
- Born: 6 September 1984 (age 42) Dirkshorn, Netherlands
- Height: 1.88 m (6 ft 2 in)
- Weight: 69 kg (152 lb; 10.9 st)

Cycling career
- Sport: Cycling
- Discipline: Road
- Role: Rider
- Rider type: All-rounder

Professional teams
- 2003–2004: Rabobank GS3
- 2004: → Rabobank (stagiaire)
- 2005–2008: Rabobank
- 2009: Silence–Lotto
- 2011: Chipotle–Garmin Development Team
- 2012–2014: Garmin–Barracuda

Major wins
- Stage races Tirreno–Adriatico (2006) Tour de Romandie (2007) Single-day races and Classics National Time Trial Championships (2004, 2005)

Thomas Dekker (born 6 September 1984) is a Dutch former professional road racing cyclist. His career highlights included winning Tirreno–Adriatico in 2006 and Tour de Romandie in 2007. He won two Dutch National Time Trial Championships and represented his country at the 2004 Summer Olympics held in Athens, Greece.

A few days before the start of the 2009 Tour de France, it was announced that Dekker had tested positive for EPO in a retroactive test carried out on a urine sample taken in December 2007. Dekker initially protested his innocence, but he later admitted to using EPO, claiming it was a one-time mistake. He eventually admitted to using EPO over at least parts of the 2007 and 2008 seasons, although he declined to give exact dates. Dekker was suspended for two years, from 1 July 2009 to 30 June 2011.

Dekker's career has been marked by other doping allegations. He was a client of Luigi Cecchini, an Italian doctor who was investigated in relation to doping matters, though Dekker adamantly denies that Cecchini was involved in his doping. In 2009 he was also questioned in the Humanplasma doping scandal, a suspected doping ring connected to Austrian manager Stefan Matschiner. Dekker retired in March 2015 after narrowly failing to set a new world hour record.

== Career ==
=== Early years ===
Dekker was born and raised in Dirkshorn, North Holland, Netherlands. He was nicknamed "The hulk from Dirkshorn" and joined the Rabobank junior team in 2002, winning the Junior National time trial championships, among other races. In 2003 he joined Rabobank GS3, the continental team of Rabobank, winning two stages of Ster Elekrotoer, and the national under-23 titles in the Road Race and Time Trial disciplines. He also finished third in the Men's under-23 road race of the 2003 UCI Road World Championships.

In 2004 he won the Tour de Normandie, Olympia's Tour, the Dutch National Time Trial Championships and also participated in the 2004 Summer Olympics at the age of 19, finishing 21st in the individual time trial. Later in the season, he also won the Grand Prix Eddy Merckx with Koen de Kort but crashed out of the Tour de l'Avenir while he was leading the race. In September, he joined the Rabobank UCI ProTeam for the rest of the 2004 season as a stagiaire. He won a stage of Rheinland-Pfalz Rundfahrt, finished second in both the U23 individual time trial and U23 road race of 2004 UCI Road World Championships and finished first in the UCI U23 Classification of 2004.

=== Rabobank ===
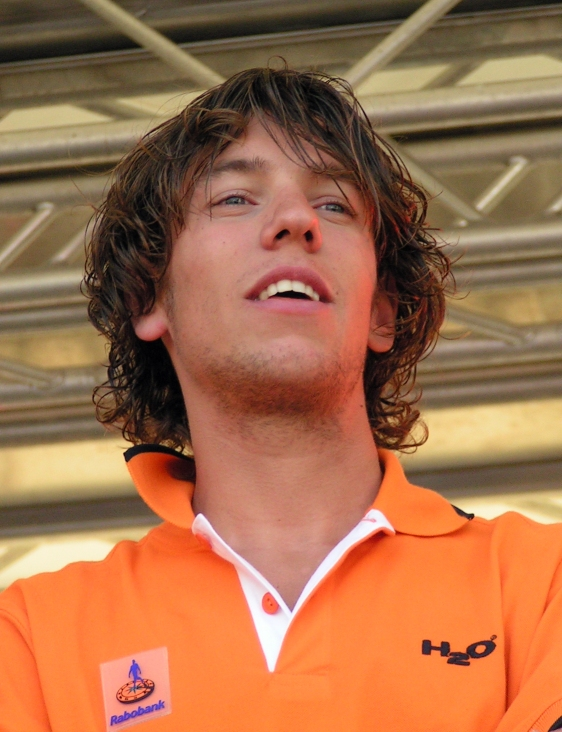
Dekker at the 2006 Deutschland Tour

Dekker turned professional in 2005 with Rabobank. In his first season as a professional, he won Grote Prijs Stad Zottegem and stages of Critérium International and Tour de Pologne. He also repeated his victory in the Dutch National Time Trial Championships and rode the Giro d'Italia.

In 2006 Dekker won the Tirreno–Adriatico stage race, making him the third Dutch cyclist to win the event, after Joop Zoetemelk (1985) and Erik Dekker (2002) and in 2007 the Tour de Romandie stage race, which featured two time trials and several difficult climbing stages in the Alps and Jura Mountains.

In 2007, Dekker debuted in the Tour de France. Although he had been dreaming of winning the young rider classification, he did not win it. He eventually reached the 35th place in the overall final standings, and sixth in the young rider classification, in the Tour. Dekker finished his 2007 season with his first top ten finish in a 'Classic,' the 2007 Giro di Lombardia.

The 2008 season got off to a promising start, with Dekker coming in 3rd place overall in both the Vuelta a Castilla y León and Tour of the Basque Country and achieving three top-ten finishes in the Ardennes classics. However, after a poor showing in the Tour de Suisse, Dekker was not selected by Rabobank for its 2008 Tour de France line-up.

On 14 August 2008 Dekker officially announced on his web page that he had split from Rabobank. Although an early report in SportWereld said Dekker was on the verge of signing with Garmin-Chipotle, team manager Jonathan Vaughters later denied this rumour. Dekker later revealed in an interview and in his book Schoon Genoeg that Vaughters had been on the verge of signing him, but the deal fell through when Dekker's blood values indicated he'd been doping. According to Dekker, this was the wake-up call he needed to quit using performance-enhancing drugs. On 27 September 2008, it was announced that Dekker had signed a contract with Silence–Lotto for two years.

=== Silence-Lotto ===
In 2009, Dekker finished a respectable 16th in the Tour of Switzerland, with a highlight of 3rd place in the second, 39 km long, individual time trial.

On 1 July 2009, it was announced that a re-test of an out-of-competition sample taken in December 2007, while Dekker was with Rabobank, was found to contain the banned substance EPO. Silence–Lotto immediately removed him from their team for the 2009 Tour de France. Once his B-sample confirmed the EPO positive, Silence-Lotto fired Dekker, who admitted doping, apologizing and calling it "a mistake". The Monaco Cycling Federation, where Dekker held his racing license, announced on 3 March 2010 that Dekker had been suspended for two years, until 1 July 2011. In addition, the UCI stripped Dekker of all of his results from 24 December 2007, the date of his positive. According to UCI, Dekker was singled out as a result of the biological passport programme, prompting the UCI to conduct a detailed review of past doping controls.

=== Return with Garmin ===
Even if Jonathan gave me a difficult mission, he was and is always there to support me. He came up with the combination Dekker-Van Summeren for Duo Normand. It reminds him of the duo he was with Jens Voigt, when they won Duo Normand in 2001. He challenged me and Johan to beat the time he had set with Voigt in 2001. And we did it! How cool is that?

— Dekker, after winning Duo Normand, Cyclingnews.com

Dekker returned to racing on 6 July 2011 in the Grote Prijs Stad St. Niklaas, where he finished 70th. On 1 August he announced that he had signed with the Chipotle–Garmin Development Team, the development team of Garmin–Cervélo. On 18 September he won his first race after his comeback. He won the Duo Normand Team Time Trial together with Paris–Roubaix winner Johan Vansummeren. Garmin–Cervélo team manager Jonathan Vaughters challenged the two to beat the time he himself rode in 2001 with Jens Voigt. Dekker and Vansummeren beat the time of Vaughters and Voigt.

On 18 November 2011, Dekker was confirmed as a Garmin–Barracuda rider for the 2012 season. He left the team in November 2014. Dekker subsequently announced that he would focus on an attempt to break the world hour record in the spring of 2015 instead of finding a new team for the road cycling season.

== Doping ==
In a 2013 interview with Dutch daily newspaper NRC Handelsblad, Dekker stated that he started using performance-enhancing drugs when he joined Rabobank in 2005. In that team doping (including EPO) had been used since the mid-1990s, and Dekker stated that it was part of the profession: "doping was a way of life". Documents obtained during the Operación Puerto doping case proved that Dekker had been a customer of Eufemiano Fuentes, a well-known sports doctor who had assisted the Kelme team and many cycling professionals with blood doping; Spanish police found bags of Dekker's blood (Dekker was code-named "rider 24" and "Clasicómano Luigi"), and it turned out that he had had at least two transfusions in the spring of 2006, one four days before winning the Tirreno–Adriatico and another before riding the Tour of the Basque Country. In his interview with NRC, he admitted to having used EPO as well.

== Career achievements ==
=== Major results ===
2003
National Under-23 Road Championships

1st Road race
1st Time trial

3rd Road race, UCI Road World Under-23 Championships
3rd De Vlaamse Pijl
7th Overall Ster Elektrotoer

1st Prologue & Stage 2

2004
1st Time trial, National Road Championships
1st Overall Le Triptyque des Monts et Châteaux

1st Stage 2

1st Overall Tour de Normandie
1st Overall Olympia's Tour
1st Grand Prix Eddy Merckx
1st Stage 1 Tour de l'Avenir
UCI Road World Under-23 Championships

2nd Road race
2nd Time trial

3rd Grand Prix Pino Cerami
4th Overall Volta ao Algarve
2005
1st Time trial, National Road Championships
1st Grote Prijs Stad Zottegem
2nd Overall Critérium International

1st Stage 2

3rd Overall Tour de Pologne

1st Stage 7 (ITT)

4th Overall Eneco Tour

1st Young rider classification

6th Overall Tour Méditerranéen
2006
1st Overall Tirreno–Adriatico
9th Overall Eneco Tour
2007
1st Overall Tour de Romandie

1st Points classification
1st Stage 5 (ITT)

1st Overall 3-Länder-Tour

1st Stages 2 & 4 (ITT)

1st Trofeo Pollença
1st RaboRonde Heerlen
1st Stage 6 Tour de Suisse
5th Overall Eneco Tour
8th Giro di Lombardia
9th Gran Premio Bruno Beghelli

Voided results from 24 December 2007 to 1 July 2009.

2008
~~3rd Overall Tour of the Basque Country~~
~~3rd Overall Vuelta a Castilla y León~~

~~1st Points classification~~

~~5th Amstel Gold Race~~
~~5th La Flèche Wallonne~~
~~6th Liège–Bastogne–Liège~~
2009
~~4th Overall Tour of Belgium~~

2011
1st Duo Normand (with Johan Vansummeren)
7th Chrono Champenois
2012
1st Stage 2 (TTT) Tour of Qatar
5th Overall Circuit de la Sarthe

1st Stage 5

2013
8th Overall Ster ZLM Toer
2014
5th Overall Ster ZLM Toer

=== General classification results timeline ===
Grand Tour general classification results timeline
Grand Tour	2005	2006	2007	2008	2009	2010	2011	2012	2013	2014
Giro d'Italia	75	—	—	—	—	—	—	—	136	DNF
Tour de France	—	—	35	—	—	—	—	—	—	—
/ Vuelta a España	—	—	—	—	—	—	—	149	—	—
Major stage race general classification results
Major stage race	2005	2006	2007	2008	2009	2010	2011	2012	2013	2014
/ Paris–Nice	31	—	—	—	—	—	—	88	—	—
/ Tirreno–Adriatico	—	1	49	—	98	—	—	—	DNF	106
Volta a Catalunya	—	—	—	—	54	—	—	—	—	—
Tour of the Basque Country	—	75	DNF	3	DNF	—	—	—	—	—
/ Tour de Romandie	33	—	1	DNF	—	—	—	—	—	—
Critérium du Dauphiné	—	71	—	—	—	—	—	—	—	—
Tour de Suisse	—	—	39	DNF	16	—	—	DNF	—	—

Legend
—	Did not compete
DNF	Did not finish

== See also ==
- List of Dutch Olympic cyclists

Sporting positions
Preceded by	Dutch National Time Trial Champion; 2005	Succeeded by Stef Clement
