= Virtual Antenna Mapping =

Method used in wireless telecom products

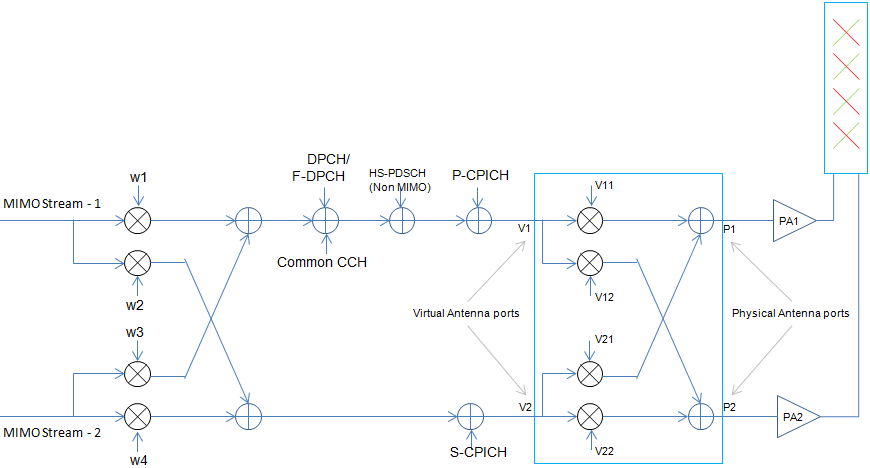
VAM architecture

Virtual Antenna Mapping (VAM) is used in wireless telecom networks. Typically when MIMO is deployed using two power Amplifier for two transmit antennae, there is a risk that both power amplifiers are not optimally used. Non-MIMO traffic would be using up to half of the available power whereas MIMO traffic could use the full power. This could potentially have an adverse impact on the overall cell throughput.

VAM is used to achieve the goal of power balancing the physical channels across the multiple physical antennas especially when MIMO is deployed in the downlink. VAM gives an illusion to the UE that there are actually fewer antennas at the base station than it actually has. The unbalanced balanced power across two transmits paths are transformed into balanced power at physical antenna ports by VAM. This is achieved using phase and amplitude coefficients (V_{11}, V_{12}, V_{21}, V_{22}) as depicted in the figure. Thus both the power amplifiers are optimally used even for signals transmitted on the first antenna.

== See also ==
- Radio
- Beam forming
- Precoding
- Spatial multiplexing
- Diversity coding
