= Stefan Matschiner =

Austrian middle-distance runner

Stefan Matschiner is a former Austrian track athlete and sports agent, and a convicted enabler of blood doping. After a brief career as a middle-distance runner (competing in the 800 and 1500 metres for the University of Memphis, and in the 1500 metres event at the 2002 European Athletics Indoor Championships), he became a manager for a number of world-class athletes and helped some of them with blood transfusions and, allegedly, supplied them with EPO. He was arrested in 2009 and convicted in 2010. Since then he has published a tell-all book and given interviews about his career as a doping-enabler.

== Biography ==
=== Athletics ===
Matschiner was born 14 May 1975 in Laakirchen, Austria, and attended the Höhere Technische Lehranstalt in Vöcklabruck. He was a middle-distance runner at the University of Memphis. He claimed, in a 2011 interview, to have started using performance-enhancing drugs at the age of 25, when he was a 1500 metres runner. He ran in the second heat of the 1500 metres race at the 2002 European Athletics Indoor Championships but did not qualify for the semi-final.

=== Management and doping ===
After he retired as an athlete he worked as a manager and sports agent, founding the "International Sports Agency" in 2003. His first clients were Kenyan runners, with whom he says he discussed doping openly. His name came up in a doping scandal during the 2006 Winter Olympics in Turin when he was staying at the Turin house of Walter Mayer, a former skier and coach banned from all Olympic events; Matschiner at the time was working with Manfred Kiesl, in whose home doping substances were found in 1997.

=== Doping conviction ===
His agency began managing high-profile clients such as Michael Rasmussen and Bernhard Kohl, and Matschiner helped his athletes by administering blood transfusions in the Austrian village of Steyrermühl between the spring of 2007 and May 2008. Kohl had finished third in the 2008 Tour de France and won the polka dot jersey for best climber, but was later found to have used the performance-enhancing drug EPO (specifically, the class known as CERA) and stripped of his position and jersey. Kohl stated in early 2009 that he had met Matschiner in 2005 and started doping after their first meeting. Matschiner was arrested shortly thereafter, and during the investigation by the special doping task force of the Vienna Bundeskriminalamt (BKA), many other names were turned up and accusations made. At the time of his arrest, his website listed a number of Kenyan athletes as clients; Athletics Kenya chairman Isaiah Kiplagat claimed that Matschiner "is a total stranger to us". Swiss cyclist Markus Zberg was, according to the BKA, given Dynepo by Matschiner on orders of Kohl; Matschiner named Zberg again in his guilty plea in 2010. During the trial, Kohl admitted having discussed doping with Zberg in March or April 2008 and to have given him Matschiner's number. Zberg did not comment in 2009, when the allegations were first made, nor in 2010, when they were repeated, though he hired an attorney. Also named in the investigation and in Matschiner's plea was Austrian triathlete Lisa Hütthaler. Hütthaler's name had been mentioned in early 2009 and she confessed to the Austrian media in March of that year, though Matschiner at that time denied; she stated she had paid Matschiner more than $20,000 for doses of EPO. Matschiner stated he had provided five other athletes with "EPO, testosterone, and growth hormones", but did not name them.

Documents uncovered during the investigation incriminated other athletes as well. These included Dutch cyclists Michael Boogerd and Thomas Dekker, and were part of the dossier that led to Dekker's suspension from professional cycling in 2009.

In 2010, Matschiner was sentenced by an Austrian court to a 15-month jail term; one month was taken off because he had spent five weeks in jail after his arrest and the rest of the sentence was suspended. During the trial, Matschiner explained in detail how he gave Kohl blood transfusions, though he denied having given Kohl CERA. He was placed on probation for three years. After the trial he showed no remorse, and announced a tell-all book, Borderline, to be published in January 2011.

The publication of Matschiner's book (with Riva Verlag) in 2011 led to more media interviews, in which he stated he had no regrets and downplayed the health risks of doping. In an interview with Die Zeit, he said that doping is ubiquitous in all sports in all countries, and that athletes are very much aware of the risks: "only the stupid ones get caught." From 2005 to 2007, he operated a blood bank, Humanplasma, which was responsible for delivering blood to various cycling professionals and other athletes; he claimed he stopped doing that in 2008 when the Austrian authorities enacted stronger anti-doping measures. In February 2013, Matschiner claimed to have given blood to a number of riders from the Dutch Rabobank team (including Denis Menchov, Michael Boogerd, who denied having used doping, and Thomas Dekker).
