= VAM (bicycling) =

Metric used to measure the speed of elevation gain in cycling

VAM is the abbreviation for the Italian term velocità ascensionale media, translated in English to mean "average ascent speed" or "mean ascent velocity", but usually referred to as VAM. It is also referred to by the English backronym "Vertical Ascent in Meters". The term, which was coined by Italian physician and cycling coach Michele Ferrari, is the speed of elevation gain, usually stated in units of metres per hour.

== Background ==
VAM is a parameter used in cycling as a measure of fitness and speed; it is useful for relatively objective comparisons of performances and estimating a rider's power output per kilogram of body mass, which is one of the most important qualities of a cyclist who competes in stage races and other mountainous events. Dr. Michele Ferrari also stated that VAM values exponentially rise up with every gradient increase. For example, a 1180 VAM of a 64 kg rider on a 5% gradient is equivalent to a VAM of 1400 m/h on a 10 % or a VAM of 1675 m/h on a 13% gradient. Ambient conditions (e.g. friction, air resistance) have less effect on steeper slopes (absorb less power) since speeds are lower on steeper slopes

The acronym VAM is not truly expanded in English, where many think the V stands in some way for vertical, and the M represents metres, for instance "Vertical Ascent Metres/Hour." Ferrari says,

I called this parameter Average Ascent Speed (‘VAM’ in its Italian abbreviation from Velocità Ascensionale Media).

A direct translation of "velocità ascensionale media" is "mean (average) ascent velocity" leading to an expansion of the acronym in English as Velocity, Ascent, Mean.

== Definition ==
VAM is calculated the following way:

VAM = (metres ascended × 60) / minutes it took to ascend

A standard unit term with the same meaning is Vm/h, vertical metres per hour; the two are used interchangeably.

== Relationship to relative power output ==
Relative power means power P per body mass m. Without friction and extra mass (the bicycle), the relative power would be VAM times acceleration of gravity g:

$$\frac P m = \mathrm{VAM}\cdot g$$

With g = 9.81 m/s^{2}, this is equivalent to

Relative power (watts/kg) = VAM (metres/hour) $\cdot\frac{9.81}{3600}\approx$ VAM (metres/hour) / 367

Including the power necessary for the extra mass and dissipated by friction leads to a lower number in the denominator. An empirical relationship is

Relative power (watts/kg) = VAM (metres/hour) / (200 + 10 × % grade)

== Examples ==
Examples:

- 1800+ Vm/h: Chris Froome.
- 1650-1800 Vm/h: Top 10 / Tour de France GC or mountain stage winner.
- 1450-1650 Vm/h: Top 20 / Tour de France GC; top 20 on tough mountain stage.
- 1300-1450 Vm/h: Finishing Tour de France mountain stages in peloton
- 1100-1300 Vm/h: The Autobus Crew
