= Conconi test =

Sports medicine test

- Purpose: measure aerobic threshold heart rates.

The Conconi Test is a sports medicine test intended to measure an individual's maximum anaerobic and aerobic threshold heart rates.

The test measures a person's heart rate at different loads (e.g. faster speeds on a treadmill). The points are plotted on a graph with heart rate on one axis and power (or some correlated measurement such as running speed) on the other axis; the graph's deflection point indicates the aerobic threshold. The heart rate increases (approximately) linearly up to the deflection point, where the heart rate reaches AT (also known as LT, lactate threshold, in more modern nomenclature). The test continues for a while, under increasing load, until the subject has gone well past the anaerobic threshold.

== Accuracy ==
Two studies from the mid 90s showed the Conconi test to be inaccurate and impractical in assessing the anaerobic threshold, while other recent studies are disputing or have disputed this contention, and still others proposed modifications to improve the test.

== See also ==
- Cardiac stress test
