= Conseil de prévention et de lutte contre le dopage =

The Conseil de prévention et de lutte contre le dopage (French for "council to prevent and counteract doping") was created by law 99–223 of March 23, 1999, relating to the protection of the health of athletes and the fight against doping. Its operations are defined by articles R3612-1 to D3612-4 of the French public health code.

The Laboratoire national de dépistage du dopage (LNDD - national laboratory for the detection of doping) was created in 1966 in accordance with a law of June 1, 1965, for the suppression of the use of stimulants in competitive sports, also known as the Herzog law. Since 1989 it has been located at Châtenay-Malabry, a suburb of Paris. It is a division of the Ministry of Sport; its operations are defined by articles R3632-18 to 3632-43 of the French public health code.

As of August 2006, Jacques de Ceaurriz is the director.

Both organizations were subsumed in 2006 by the Agence Française de Lutte contre le Dopage.
