= Luigi Cecchini =

Italian sports doctor

Luigi Cecchini (born 1944) is an Italian sports doctor who is active in road bicycle racing. He is well known as a maker of training schemes that he writes for his clients as well as for the use of the SRM cycle computer.

Cecchini is a former motor-racing pilot and the son of a millionaire shirt manufacturer, who had specialised as a sports scientist who studied in Pisa. In an interview in May 1997, Cecchini was referred to as Bjarne Riis’s coach, medic, and personal advisor whom he started to work with in 1992. With Cecchini at his side Riis won the 1996 Tour de France.

== Involvement with cycling ==
Cecchini has worked with many of the most successful cyclists of the late 1990s, including Tour de France winners Riis and Jan Ullrich, Classic specialists Michele Bartoli, Olympic time trial gold medallists Tyler Hamilton and the super sprinter Alessandro Petacchi. In 1996, three of his clients, Pascal Richard, Rolf Sørensen and Max Sciandri took the podium at the Olympics road race. Cecchini was a coach to Jan Ullrich since the winter of 2002/2003. David Millar trained under Cecchini’s guidance in May and June 2006. Damiano Cunego was also a client of Cecchini. Thomas Dekker started working with Cecchini in January 2006 but only on training programs. Dekker was under pressure and broke his association with Cecchini. Linus Gerdemann trained with Cecchini until May, 2006. In 1996 Cecchini’s clients were very successful with Riis winning the Tour and his other clients dominating the first professional Olympic road race. In 2002, many of his clients obtained success. Bartoli won the Amstel Gold Race and the Giro di Lombardia. Andrea Tafi won the Tour of Flanders. Mario Cipollini won Milan–San Remo, Gent–Wevelgem and the World Championship road race.

=== Team CSC ===
When Riis moved into team management with Team CSC, he took Cecchini with him. Tyler Hamilton joined CSC in 2002 and Riis introduced Hamilton to Cecchini in 2002. Hamilton worked with him until his positive doping test for blood doping. After winning the gold at the Olympics time trial event, Hamilton thanked Cecchini

When Ivan Basso joined Team CSC in 2004, Team Manager Riis employed Luigi Cecchini as Basso's personal trainer. Basso parted ways with Cecchini in April 2006. Basso maintained a private relationship with Dr Luigi Cecchini, who was also Riis' coach in 1996 and involved with CSC until 2004. Cecchini had not been his team's doctor for some years and that he acted as the sporting adviser and trainer to just four CSC riders: Fabian Cancellara, Matti Breschel, Michael Blaudzun and Nicki Sorensen during the 2006 season.

== Clients ==
- Michele Bartoli, two-time winner of the Giro di Lombardia and Liège–Bastogne–Liège
- Ivan Basso, winner of the Giro d’Italia of 2006.
- Paolo Bettini, Olympic road race champion 2004, world champion in 2006 & 2007
- Michael Blaudzun, Denmark national road race champion 1994, 2004; Denmark national time trial champion 2001, 2003, 2005
- Matti Breschel, winner stage 21 of the 2008 Vuelta a España; Bronze medalist 2008 World Championships road race
- Gianni Bugno, winner of Giro d’Italia 1990, world champion in 1991 and 1992
- Fabian Cancellara, Time trial champion 2006 & 2007; Gold Medalist 2008 Olympic time trial; Bronze Medalist 2008 Olympic road race; Gold Medalist 2016 Olympic time trial
- Francesco Casagrande, runner-up at the Giro d’Italia 2001
- Angel Casero, winner Vuelta a España 2001
- Mario Cipollini, world champion 2002
- Damiano Cunego, winner of the Giro d’Italia of 2004
- Thomas Dekker, winner Tirreno–Adriatico 2006 and Tour de Romandie 2007.
- Juan Antonio Flecha
- Linus Gerdemann, winner of the 2008 Tour of Germany (Deutschland Tour); winner of stage 7 in the 2007 Tour de France
- Tyler Hamilton, Olympic time trial champion 2004.
- Jörg Jaksche
- Kim Kirchen, winner La Flèche Wallonne 2008, held green and yellow jerseys in 2008 Tour de France
- Alessandro Petacchi, winner of Milan–San Remo 2005 and Paris–Tours 2007
- Pascal Richard, Olympic road race champion 1996
- Bjarne Riis, winner 1996 Tour de France
- Maximilian Sciandri, bronze medal Olympic road race 1996
- Nicki Sørensen, Denmark national road race champion 2003 & 2008
- Rolf Sørensen, winner Tour of Flanders 1997
- Andrea Tafi, winner Paris–Roubaix 1999
- Jan Ullrich, winner 1997 Tour de France, 1999 Vuelta a España, World champion time trial 1999, 2001 and Olympic road race champion 2000.
