= Doping at the 1998 Tour de France =

Use of illegal drugs in the cycling event

The year in which the 1998 Tour de France took place marked the moment when cycling was fundamentally shattered by doping revelations. Paradoxically no riders were caught failing drug tests by any of the ordinary doping controls in place at the time. Nevertheless, several police searches and interrogations managed to prove existence of organized doping at the two teams Festina and TVM, who consequently had to withdraw from the race. After stage 16, the police also forced the virtual mountain jersey holder Rodolfo Massi to leave the race, due to having found illegal corticosteroids in his hotel room. The intensive police work then led to a peloton strike at stage 17, with a fallout of four Spanish teams and one Italian team deciding to leave the race in protest.

Many years later, retrospective tests and rider confessions confirmed the common suspicion that consumption of EPO had not been limited to those being caught by the police, but in fact was something the majority of the peloton had used at this point of time.

== Police investigations and arrests ==
Three days ahead of the Tour start, the masseur of Team Festina, Willy Voet, was found at the Belgian border to have his car full of large quantities of syringes and controlled substances, including narcotics, erythropoietin (EPO), growth hormones, testosterone and amphetamines. When raiding the Festina headquarters in France, the police also found a document with systematic drug programmes for the Festina riders. As the Tour had started in Ireland, the French police waited to the first stage in France before arresting the Festina Team's directeur sportif and doctor: Bruno Roussel and Eric Rijckaert. Faced by the evidence, Roussel and Rijckaert soon confessed, leading to all nine Festina riders (incl. notable riders such as 1997 runner-up Richard Virenque, Alex Zülle and Christophe Moreau), being forced to withdraw after stage 6.

At the first rest day, after stage 11, the Festina affair got extended, with several other teams being searched by the police, and a second police investigation leading to long interrogations of TVM riders and imprisonment of the three TVM staffs: Cees Priem (manager), Andrei Mikhailov (doctor) and Jan Moors (soigneur). As a reaction to the treatment by the French police, the peloton staged a solidarity sit-down protest both during stage 12 and stage 17. The Tour directors later nullified the results of stage 17, as the peloton in a gesture had let all TVM-riders pass the finish line a couple of seconds ahead of the peloton. All four Spanish teams (ONCE, Banesto, Vitalicio Seguros, Kelme) and one Italian team (Riso Scotti) even decided to pull out of the race, at the urging of the ONCE team, led by the French National Champion Laurent Jalabert. After the stage, the police due to a suspicion of organized doping also at other teams, decided to search their hotels and arrested rider Rodolfo Massi (Casino) and the two team managers Marc Madiot (Française des Jeux) and Vincent Lavenu (Casino). Massi was at this point of time nr.7 in the GC and wearing the mountain jersey, but had to leave the race due to the police finding illegal corticosteroids in his hotel room. He was also charged by the police for having sold EPO and other medicines to some riders in the peloton, as Voet had named him as one of his "business relationships", but this criminal charge was later dropped — due to no additional proof found by police. The Italian Olympic Committee subsequently only banned him six months for doping possession.

After stage 17, all the six remaining TVM-riders in the race were escorted by the police to the nearest hospital, for submission of samples to an extra judicial ordered doping control. One day later, the TVM team decided also collectively to withdraw from the race, and thus became the final 7th team to withdraw.

== Festina riders tested by police ==
According to the doping test analysis result for the nine Festina riders, with samples withdrawn by police on 23 July 1998, the following doping substances had been detected:

- Richard Virenque (EPO).
- Alex Zülle (EPO).
- Laurent Dufaux (EPO).
- Armin Meier (EPO).
- Neil Stephens (EPO).
- Pascal Hervé (EPO and amphetamines).
- Laurent Brochard (EPO and amphetamines).
- Didier Rous (EPO and amphetamines).
- Christophe Moreau (EPO* and amphetamines) *NB: His EPO-test was inconclusive, but he admitted also using EPO.

Not all of the nine Festina-riders immediately confessed. While the first seven riders all opted to admit using performance-enhancing drugs when confronted with their failed test results in November 1998, the last two riders Virenque and Herve continued to maintain their innocence, until they in October 2000 finally admitted during the final court proceedings. All riders with failed tests were punished with a half-year suspension, except Neil Stephens, who escaped a sanction by choosing to retire.

== TVM riders tested by police ==
In the TVM investigation, the police did not limit the extra doping test for samples withdrawn 29 July of the six remaining TVM-riders in the race (Jeroen Blijlevens, Bart Voskamp, Servais Knaven, Steven de Jongh, Serguei Outschakov and Sergei Ivanov). On 20 August 1998 they also called in these seven riders for interrogation and submission of samples for additional doping control: Michel Lafis, Tristan Hoffman, Hendrik Van Dijck, Peter Van Petegem, Laurent Roux, Johan Capiot and Lars Michaelsen. As one of these riders, it was either Capiot or Michaelsen, refused to submit samples, the total number of tested TVM riders was 12. In May 2001, during the final court hearing in the TVM trial, the medical expert witnesses stated, that from this tested group the test results had proofed, that the following six were "very likely" to have injected the specified doping substances:

- Jeroen Blijlevens (EPO and corticosteroids).
- Bart Voskamp (EPO and corticosteroids).
- Serguei Outschakov (EPO and corticosteroids).
- Servais Knaven (EPO).
- Laurent Roux (amphetamines, corticosteroids and cannabis).
- Tristan Hoffman (amphetamines). *NB: Did not race in the 1998 Tour de France.

All of the six riders who failed drug tests, refused in court ever to have used doping. The court however found sufficient amount of evidence had been presented (104 EPO vials seized from a TVM-car in March 1998, syringes with EPO remainings found in dustbins located in TVM rented hotel rooms during the Tour de France, as well as other doping products seized from TVM's Tour bus), to conclude that organized doping at the TVM team was conducted in the preparation and during the 1998 Tour de France. Consequently, the court handed out suspended sentences from 6–18 months to the team's manager, sports director and soigneur. For unknown reasons, none of the six riders with failed tests had their cases evaluated by a sports court, and thus none of them ever received suspensions for their failed tests.

Later confessions of the nine TVM-riders in the 1998 Tour de France:

- Laurent Roux subsequently also failed tests for amphetamines twice, in April 1999 and April 2002, and for the second offence he got a four-year suspension. In June 2006 he confessed at a doping trial in Bordeaux, that while being suspended he had both consumed and sold the drug known in the peloton as "pot Belge" (a mixture of amphetamines, caffeine, and cocaine/heroin), and he also confessed, that throughout his active career from 1994 to 2002 he had used EPO, human growth hormone, cortisone and testosterone.
- Steven de Jongh, admitted using EPO "on a few occasions" in 1998–2000. When UCI introduced the EPO-test in April 2001, he decided to compete clean in the rest of his career.
- Jeroen Blijlevens confessed in 2013, after the publication of results from a retrospective EPO-test, to have used this drug in the 1997 and 1998 edition of the Tour.

== Retrospective EPO test ==
At the time of the race there was no official test for EPO. In 2004, 60 remaining antidoping samples given by riders during the 1998 Tour, were tested retrospectively for recombinant EPO by using three recently developed detection methods. More precisely the laboratory compared the result of test method A: "Autoradiography — visual inspection of light emitted from a strip displaying the isoelectric profile for EPO" (published in the Nature journal as the first EPO detection method in June 2000), with the result of test method B: "Percentage of basic isoforms — using an ultra-sensitive camera that by percentage quantify the light intensity emitted from each of the isoelectric bands" (pioneered at the Olympics in September 2000, with values above 80% classified as failed, but the laboratory applying an 85% threshold for retrospective samples – to be absolutely certain that no false-positives (incorrectly failed tests) can occur when analyzing on samples stored for multiple years). For those samples with enough urine left, these results of test method A+B were finally also compared with the best and latest test method C: "Statistical discriminant analysis — taking account all the band profiles by statistical distinguish calculations for each band" (which feature both higher sensitivity and accuracy compared to test method B).

The results of test method A applied retrospectively in 2004, were published to have returned 44 positives (failed) and 9 negatives (not failed), while the last 7 samples did not return any readable results due to sample degradation. At first, the rider names with a positive sample were not made public, as it had only been conducted as scientific research. In July 2013, the antidoping committee of the French Senate however decided it would benefit the current doping fight to shed full light on the past, and so decided — as part of their "Commission of Inquiry into the effectiveness of the fight against doping" report — to publish all sample IDs along with the result of the retrospective test. This publication revealed, that the 9 negative samples belonged to 5 riders, of which 2 have admitted to have used EPO before or during the 1998 Tour de France (George Hincapie and Stuart O'Grady), while the 44 positive samples belonged to 33 riders — including race winner Marco Pantani, runner-up Jan Ullrich, third on the podium Bobby Julich, and points-competition winner Erik Zabel.

44 Positive samples for Recombinant EPO (Note: Positive samples marked with a *, were only analyzed by the visual inspection test "autoradiography" (referred to as "test method A"), and not by one of the later WADA approved EPO detection test methods (referred to as test method B and C). Some press sources consequently decided to label those samples only as "suspicious", rather than "positive".)
Sample ID	Date	Rider	Team
066-211	19 July	Abraham Olano (ESP)	Banesto
066-191*	14 July	Alain Turicchia (ITA)	Asics–CGA
066-197	12 July	Andrea Tafi (ITA)	Mapei
066-189*	21 July	Axel Merckx (BEL)	Polti
066-199	13 July	Bo Hamburger (DEN)	Casino-Ag2r
066-092*	21 July	Bobby Julich (USA)	Cofidis
064-424	31 July	Eddy Mazzoleni (ITA)	Saeco
066-083	19 July	Eddy Mazzoleni (ITA)	Saeco
066-200	12 July	Erik Zabel (GER)	Telekom
066-216	21 July	Erik Zabel (GER)	Telekom
066-205*	11 July	Ermanno Brignoli (ITA)	Riso Scotti–MGM
066-084	19 July	Fabio Sacchi (ITA)	Polti
066-209*	17 July	Frédéric Moncassin (FRA)	GAN
066-090	26 July	Giuseppe Calcaterra (ITA)	Saeco Macchine
066-086	19 July	Jacky Durand (FRA)	Casino-Ag2r
064-421*	28 July	Jan Ullrich (GER)	Telekom
065-110	02 Aug	Jan Ullrich (GER)	Telekom
066-101	24 July	Jan Ullrich (GER)	Telekom
066-210*	18 July	Jan Ullrich (GER)	Telekom
066-224	26 July	Jan Ullrich (GER)	Telekom
066-198	14 July	Jens Heppner (GER)	Telekom
066-085	15 July	Jeroen Blijlevens (NED)	TVM–Farm Frites
066-087	25 July	Kevin Livingston (USA)	Cofidis
066-094	20 July	Laurent Desbiens (FRA)	Cofidis
066-219	22 July	Laurent Jalabert (FRA)	ONCE
066-183	22 July	Manuel Beltrán (ESP)	Banesto
064-408	28 July	Marco Pantani (ITA)	Mercatone Uno
066-095	22 July	Marco Pantani (ITA)	Mercatone Uno
066-096*	21 July	Marco Pantani (ITA)	Mercatone Uno
066-222	27 July	Marco Pantani (ITA)	Mercatone Uno
066-099	13 July	Marcos Serrano (ESP)	Kelme–Costa Blanca
066-212	17 July	Mario Cipollini (ITA)	Saeco Macchine
066-230*	21 July	Michael Boogerd (NED)	Rabobank
066-105	15 July	Nicola Minali (ITA)	Riso Scotti-MGM
066-215	17 July	Nicola Minali (ITA)	Riso Scotti-MGM
066-192*	16 July	No ID	N/A
066-082*	18 July	Pascal Chanteur (FRA)	Casino-Ag2r
066-223*	22 July	Roland Meier (SUI)	Cofidis
065-112	02 Aug	Stefano Zanini (ITA)	Mapei
066-098	24 July	Stéphane Barthe (FRA)	Casino-Ag2r
064-415	26 July	Stuart O'Grady (AUS)	GAN
066-201*	12 July	Tom Steels (BEL)	Mapei
066-213	17 July	Udo Bölts (GER)	Telekom
066-103*	15 July	Xavier Jan (FRA)	Française des Jeux

9 Negative samples for Recombinant EPO (Note: Despite submitting negative samples, both George Hincapie and Stuart O'Grady recently confessed also having used EPO before/during the 1998 Tour de France.)
Sample ID	Date	Rider	Team
066-102	15 July	George Hincapie (USA)	US Postal
064-423	02 Aug	George Hincapie (USA)	US Postal
066-181	17 July	Ján Svorada (CZE)	Mapei
064-410	31 July	Maarten den Bakker (NED)	Rabobank
066-195	13 July	No ID (either 066-195 or 066-104 belong to stage winner Ján Svorada)	N/A
066-104	13 July	No ID (either 066-195 or 066-104 belong to stage winner Ján Svorada)	N/A
066-196	12 July	Robbie McEwen (AUS)	Rabobank
064-411	30 July	Stuart O'Grady (AUS)	GAN
066-431	02 Aug	Stuart O'Grady (AUS)	GAN

Prior of the published retrospective test, the following riders had already admitted using EPO in preparation/during the 1998 Tour:

- Bobby Julich admitted "to use EPO several times from August 1996 until July 1998".
- Michael Boogerd confessed using cortisone, EPO and blood doping throughout 1997–2007.
- George Hincapie, who tested negative twice, confessed nevertheless in his affidavit to the USADA that he used EPO and other doping substances throughout 1996–2006 (incl. blood doping throughout 2001–2005), and made this specific statement about his doping use in the 1998 Tour de France: "During the Tour that year I recall using testosterone pills and hGH to recover after stages of the race and using EPO."

After the release of the retrospective test report, the following riders also admitted using EPO in preparation/during the 1998 Tour:

- Erik Zabel admitted having doped with cortisone, "magic potion" (caffeine+Persantine+Alupent), painkillers and EPO, throughout 1996–2002. In 2003 he used the same doping substances, but replaced EPO with autologous blood doping ahead of the Tour de France. For the years 2004–2005, he wanted to race clean and did not take any doping substances, except for the "magic potion", which he claim at that point of time not knowing the exact content of. After changing team from Telekom to Milram, he always competed entirely clean in the remaining part of his career, stretching from 2006 to 2008. Explicitly about his EPO abuse in the Tour de France, he explained he abused it both during the Tour and in the 2-3 week preparation phase ahead, in 1997 and 1998. For the years in 1996 and 1999–2002 his EPO abuse did not happen during the race, but was limited to the 2-3 week preparation phase ahead of the Tour. When he blood doped in 2003, this also took place shortly ahead of the Tour start, and not during the race.
- Stuart O'Grady admitted using EPO during 2 weeks ahead of the Tour de France 1998 prologue, but claimed never using it again after the Festina affair.
- Jacky Durand admitted using EPO in July 1998, and pointed out that doping back then was a standard practice among all riders in the peloton.
- Jeroen Blijlevens admitted he started to use EPO in Tour de France 1997, and continued to use the drug in Tour de France 1998.
- Laurent Jalabert's lawyer released this statement on behalf of the rider: "... he followed the prescriptions of the medical staff at his successive teams. Although no element of law has been officially notified to him, Laurent Jalabert today assumes responsibility for it and bears the consequences. He regrets that through the excesses of a past period, the image of contemporary cycling and that of the Tour de France have again been besmirched when he has always worked to promote them."

When combining the EPO abuse confessions of the two riders testing negative with all the positive test results, it was indicated that 35 out of the 38 retrospectively tested riders (92%) had been using EPO in the 1998 Tour de France. A number, which came on top of the additional 9 out of 9 Festina riders and 2 out of 9 TVM riders, who already had confessed EPO abuse due to their implication in the prior police investigations.

== Additional doping confessions ==
Among the riders who were never tested for EPO abuse, the following nevertheless later on confessed also having doped with EPO in preparation/during the 1998 Tour de France:

- Jörg Jaksche (Polti), who competed six times in the Tour (1998, 1999, 2001, 2002, 2003, 2005), confessed using EPO in 1997–2004 and then blood doping in 2005–2006. Through his career he only raced the Tour de France without being doped one time, and this was in 1999 where he finished as nr.80 in the overall. For the 1998 Tour he confessed, that his Polti team had stored cooled EPO vials inside a vacuum cleaner in the team bus, and beside of injecting himself daily with growth hormones and insulin, he also during the first 10–12 days of the Tour injected himself with 2000 EPO units every second day. He explained, that due to the many police raids, it was too dangerous to continue doping during the second half of the 1998 Tour.
- Luc Leblanc (Polti), the 1994 world champion, admitted to the court in the Festina trial (after having retired in 1999), that he had used EPO to prepare for the Tour de France, Giro d'Italia and Spanish Vuelta throughout 1994–1998. He claimed the reason he started to use EPO in 1994, while riding at the Festina team, was because he achieved a clean 5th place in the 1991 Tour de France, and then for the subsequent two years suddenly found he could not keep up with the pace of the peloton without. "It is true, but I could have taken a lot more to win these races", said Leblanc. He was riding for Team Polti in the 1998 Tour, where he opted to abandon the race in sympathy with the Festina riders. Despite confessing to doping use when riding all the Grand Tours, he insisted to have won the Rainbow Jersey in 1994 without any help of illegal substances.
- Bjarne Riis (Telekom), confessed he started doping with corticosteroids in the 80s, and that he used a package of EPO, growth hormones and corticosteroids throughout his six seasons from 1993 to 1998. After receiving a tip during the 1998 Tour de France, that his Telekom team would be searched by police as part of the probe into the Festina doping scandal, Riis stated: "In my room I didn’t have a choice. My vials of doping products had to disappear quickly. In just a few minutes I gathered all my doses of EPO and threw them down the toilet". This was the last time he doped, and he retired as a rider in June 1999.
- Rolf Aldag (Telekom), confessed using EPO throughout four seasons from 1995 to 1998. Claim he never used EPO again after the Festina affair in July 1998. In 2002 he got tempted to begin again, and bought some EPO over the Internet from the Netherlands. But when he received the package it was of so low quality, that he decided it was too dangerous and trashed it — along with the thought of ever doping again.
- Christian Henn (Telekom), confessed using EPO throughout his last five seasons from 1995 to 1999, and according to the Freiburg report began with testosterone doping in 1987.

== Riders in the top 10 of the final general classification, accused of doping ==
Chris Boardman was the only rider to wear the yellow jersey in 1998 who has not been accused of doping. Of the top ten riders to finish the 1998 Tour, eight were later accused or convicted of doping:

Rank	Name	Team	Time	Notes
1	Marco Pantani	Mercatone Uno	92h 49' 46"	Retrospectively tested positive for EPO use in July 1998. In the 1999 Giro d'Italia, while wearing the leader jersey, he was forced to take a two-week break from racing due to a hematocrit value above 50%. Died of cocaine overdose in 2004.
2	Jan Ullrich	Telekom	+ 3' 21"	Retrospectively tested positive for EPO use in July 1998. Implicated in the Telekom affair, where Jef d'Hont named him as one of the riders he injected with EPO in 1996. Involved in Operación Puerto, where he in 2011 was suspended two years, for using blood doping throughout 1 May 2005 until his last active day in June 2006. Admitted in 2013, to have used blood doping from 1 May 2005 until June 2006.
3	Bobby Julich	Cofidis	+ 4' 08"	Retrospectively tested positive for EPO use in July 1998. Accused by teammate Philippe Gaumont in the book Prisonnier du dopage, for using EPO and growth hormones as preparation ahead of the 1998 Tour. Admitted in 2012, to have used EPO several times from August 1996 until July 1998.
4	Christophe Rinero	Cofidis	+ 9' 16"	Accused by teammate Philippe Gaumont in the book Prisonnier du dopage, for using EPO and growth hormones as preparation ahead of the 1998 Tour.
5	Michael Boogerd	Rabobank	+ 11' 26"	Retrospectively tested positive for EPO use in July 1998. Accused by Floyd Landis of blood doping in 2003. Involved in the Humanplasma affair around 2006–2007. After ending his career, he admitted a previous use of cortisone at a talkshow in 2008. Admitted in March 2013, that he used cortisone, EPO and blood doping throughout 1997–2007.
6	Jean-Cyril Robin	US Postal	+ 14' 57"	
7	Roland Meier	Cofidis	+ 15' 13"	Retrospectively tested positive for EPO use in July 1998. Tested positive for EPO at the Flèche Wallonne race in April 2001.
8	Daniele Nardello	Mapei	+ 16' 07"	
9	Giuseppe Di Grande	Mapei	+ 17' 35"	Caught in the "San Remo raid" (June 2001) for using growth hormone and insulin, and by the same event sentenced to 6 months imprisonment.
10	Axel Merckx	Polti	+ 17' 39"	Retrospectively tested positive for EPO use in July 1998. Named in the Giardini Margherita criminal investigation (August 1998), as an EPO-receiving client of the doping doctor Michele Ferrari.
