= Festina affair =

Doping scandal in cycling

- Native name: affaire Festina
- Date: July 8, 1998 – July 17, 2001
- Location: Initially at Neuville-en-Ferrain, near Lille, France–Belgium border; Then throughout France including Cholet, Albertville, Toulouse and Metz
- Type: Use of erythropoietin (EPO) and other substances during the 1998 Tour de France
- Theme: Doping scandal
- Participants: Festina cycling team; Laurent Brochard; Laurent Dufaux; Pascal Hervé; Armin Meier; Christophe Moreau; Neil Stephens; Richard Virenque; Alex Zülle; TVM cycling team
- Accused: Richard Virenque (Festina cyclist; cleared from the criminal charge of "inciting the administration of doping and masking products to others and complicity in the importation of drugs"); Dr Eric Rijkaert (Former Festina doctor; charges dropped due to ill health)
- Convicted: 1. Willy Voet (Festina soigneur); 2. Bruno Roussel (Festina Directeur sportif); 3. Jef d'Hont (La Française des Jeux soigneur); 4. Jean Dalibot (former Festina soigneur); 5. Joel Chabiron (Festina communication officer); 6. Christine and Éric Paranier (Pharmacists); 7. Dr Nicolas Terrados (Team ONCE doctor); 8. Cees Priem (TVM Directeur sportif); 9. Andrei Mikhailov (TVM doctor); 10. Jan Moors (TVM soigneur)
- Sentence: 1. Voet: 10-month suspended sentence; fined F30,000; 2. Roussel: 1-year suspended sentence; fined F50,000; 3. d'Hont: nine-month suspended sentence; fined F20,000; 4. Dalibot: five-month suspended sentence 5. Chabiron: five-month suspended sentence 6. C. Paranier: fined F30,000; É. Paranier: fined F10,000; 7. Terrados: fined F30,000; 8. Priem: 18-month suspended sentence; fined F80,000; 9. Mikhailov: 1-year suspended sentence; fined F60,000; 10. Moors: six-month suspended sentence; fined F40,000
- Suspensions: Virenque: nine-month ban by the Swiss cycling federation and fined CHF4,000

The Festina affair was a series of doping scandals within the sport of professional cycling that occurred during and after the 1998 Tour de France. The affair began when a large haul of doping products was found in a support car belonging to the Festina cycling team just before the start of the race. A resulting investigation revealed systematic doping involving many teams in the Tour de France. Hotels where teams were staying were raided and searched by police, confessions were made by several retired and current riders, and team personnel were arrested or detained. Several teams withdrew completely from the race.

By December 2000, all nine Festina riders had confessed to using erythropoietin (EPO) and other substances during the 1998 Tour de France, and suspended sentences ranging from 5–12 months were handed out to Festina soigneur Willy Voet, Festina manager Bruno Roussel, La Française des Jeux soigneur Jef d'Hont, former Festina soigneur Jean Dalibot, and Festina communication officer Joel Chabiron. The two accused pharmacists, Éric Paranier and Christine Paranier, along with Team ONCE physician Nicolás Terrados, were only given fines, while the case against Festina doctor Eric Rijckaert was dropped because of his deteriorating health.

== Events ==
=== Doping in the Festina team ===
On July 8, 1998, Festina soigneur Willy Voet was stopped by customs officers at the French-Belgian border close to Neuville-en-Ferrain, near the city of Lille. Officers discovered several hundred grams and capsules of anabolic steroids, erythropoietin (EPO), syringes, and other doping products. Voet was taken into police custody. Festina offices were searched in Lyon and seized other suspect products, including perfluorocarbon.

Two days after the arrest, Bruno Roussel, directeur sportif of Festina, denied any involvement with the uncovered drugs. However, the following day, French police announced that on top of the contraband items found in Voet's car, a document was discovered at Festina's headquarters which detailed systematic drug programmes for the team's riders. As the Tour de France began in Dublin, it was announced that the Festina riders Richard Virenque, Alex Zülle and Laurent Dufaux would face questioning when they returned to France.

On July 15, Roussel and Festina team doctor Eric Rijckaert were arrested in Cholet, and the team's hotel was searched by eight gendarmes. Roussel lost his licence as a manager of a cycling team from the Union Cycliste Internationale (UCI), but Virenque, Dufaux and Brochard called a press conference and stated that the Festina team would not withdraw from the race. However, Tour de France race directeur Jean-Marie Leblanc expelled Festina from the Tour after Roussel confessed to systematic doping on the team. The following day, Virenque left the Tour in tears.

Nine riders and three officials from Festina were taken into police custody on July 23; of the entire team, only Christophe Bassons was not arrested nor implicated in doping. Eric van de Sijpe, a Belgian judge, ordered a search of Rijckaert's office, whereby the police obtained computer files proving the riders were using EPO. Virenque, Dufaux, Pascal Hervé, Didier Rous, Alex Zülle, and Armin Meier were questioned in Lyon and held in police custody. All nine of the implicated riders were escorted to a hospital and made to undergo extensive tests and give blood, hair and urine samples.

Upon release the following day, five Festina riders (Zülle, Dufaux, Moreau, Brochard and Meier) admitted to doping while Virenque and Hervé maintained their innocence. Zülle claimed that he needed to engage in doping to satisfy Festina's corporate sponsors, while Dufaux stated that he confessed due to overwhelming evidence collected by police. In custody, Voet and Roussel explained how doping was organised on the Festina team, and claimed that the other cycling teams are involved in smuggling banned substances. On July 27, Festina rider Neil Stephens admitted taking performance-enhancing drugs but claimed that he thought the EPO injections were legal supplements.

=== Doping in TVM ===
On July 19, 1998, the day after Festina left the Tour, the French daily Aujourd’hui reported that police had found 104 ampules of EPO in a vehicle belonging to the TVM team during a routine customs check close to Reims in northeast France. On the same day as the Festina arrests, French police raided TVM's hotel in Pamiers, resulting in the arrest and detainment of TVM manager Cees Priem and TVM doctor Andrei Michailov. Four other TVM officials, including directeur sportif Hendrik Redant, were interrogated and released. Police found drug evidence in a suitcase and a rubbish bin in TVM's hotel rooms in Toulouse and Metz. An investigation into TVM was launched on July 24.

On July 28, the TVM team was met by police in Albertville. Six TVM riders, including Jeroen Blijlevens, Bart Voskamp, Servais Knaven and Steven de Jongh, were taken in the night to a hospital where they gave blood, hair, and urine samples; TVM soigneur Jan Moors was arrested. Police also took three cases, a sports bag and a dustbin from the TVM team. Afterwards, the rest of the team were taken into custody and escorted to the hospital for extensive drug tests.

=== Impact on the Tour ===
Other cycling teams on the Tour expressed support for the embattled riders, and objected to their treatment as criminals. Banesto and Team ONCE expressed support for a statement by International Olympic Committee president Juan Antonio Samaranch that certain non-harmful performance-enhancing drugs should be legalized.

On July 29, the Tour peloton conducted an industrial action by cycling slowly. Team ONCE, led by French champion Laurent Jalabert, pulled out first while the Banesto and Riso Scotti teams left at the feeding zone. The peloton stopped a second time and threatened a mass withdrawal, leading the stage to be cancelled. That afternoon, raids were conducted on Team ONCE, Team Polti, La Française des Jeux, Lotto and Casino. Team managers Marc Madiot (La Française des Jeux) and Vincent Lavenu (Casino) and rider Rodolfo Massi (Casino) were arrested. Kelme and Vitalicio Seguros pulled out of the race the following day. Blijlevens pulled out near the border with Switzerland. Massi, leader of the Mountains classification, was not able to start the stage as he was still being held in police custody. The Casino team truck was seized by police, while the Festina riders reportedly implicated La Française des Jeux, Casino and Big Mat in the team's doping scheme.

The TVM team who did not start the 19th stage and returned to the Netherlands on July 31. Massi questioned by an investigating magistrate as suspicions mounted that he was involved in Festina's doping network. At this stage there are fewer than one hundred riders in the race compared to the 189 riders that started the race. On August 1, Massi was charged with inciting and facilitating the use of doping. In Reims, TVM riders submitted to several hours of questioning, after which team masseur Johannes Moors was jailed for suspicion of possessing drugs and breaches of French customs laws. Police soon found banned substances in the hotel of Team ONCE, which Terrados claimed were used by support staff.

August 4, 1998: Jean-Marie Leblanc acknowledges that the increasing speed of the peloton in the Tour was due to the increasing use of doping in the peloton.

August 5, 1998: The media contains many reports of drug finds along the route of the Tour – by farmers or by police in the hotels used by teams – for example a hotel in Voreppe used by GAN, Casino, Saeco and Kelme.

August 10, 1998: Cantina Tollo and La Française des Jeux vehicles are searched by French customs officials.

== Post-tour investigation ==
September 13, 1998: Two pharmacists Christine and Eric Paranier are questioned in respect to supplying illegal doping products to Voet.

September 18, 1998: Française des Jeux soigneur Jef d'Hont is taken into police custody and imprisoned for 11 days.

September 23, 1998: Voet accuses Virenque of doping in the French newspaper Le Parisien. Voet said to the newspaper that only three Festina riders were drug free. These were Christophe Bassons, Patrice Halgand and Laurent Lefèvre.

October 15, 1998: There is a confrontation between Virenque, Voet and Rijckaert where Virenque calls himself an innocent victim.

November 28, 1998: The results of the analysis of the samples taken from the nine Festina riders are known and are subsequently released and revealed evidence of Human Growth Hormone, amphetamines, steroids, corticoids and Erythropoietin (EPO). In eight of the nine riders test positive for synthetic EPO. The results of the ninth rider (Christophe Moreau) were indeterminate but Moreau had already admitted use of EPO. Traces of amphetamines were found in the samples of Moreau, Pascal Hervé, Laurent Brochard and Didier Rous. Four riders had hematocrit levels above the legal limit of 50%, establish in February 1997. These included Virenque, Armin Meier, Moreau who had a level of 49.3 and Laurent Dufaux who had a level of 47.2%. Five riders were above the limit. Brochard had 50.3%, Neil Stephens 50.3%, Hervé 52.6%, Rous 51% and Alex Zülle 52.3%.

December 15, 1998: Laurent Brochard, Christophe Moreau and Didier Rous are suspended by the French Cycling Federation for six months and cannot ride until April 30, 1999.

December 17, 1998: Team doctor of Team ONCE Nicolas Terrados is charged in relation to the import of banned substances.

=== Investigation in 1999 and aftermath ===
January 26, 1999: Joel Chabiron, Festina communications director, is charged.

March 23, 1999: Jean Marie Dalibot, the soigneur of Festina, is charged.

March 26, 1999: Virenque is charged with inciting the use and administration of doping products to others.

April 1, 1999: Jean-Marie Leblanc is taken into police custody and questioned.

April 4, 1999: French Federation Cycling vice president Roger Legacy and President Baal are charged with violation of the anti-doping law of 1989. (These charges would be subsequently dropped).

June, 1999: In an interview with L'Équipe, Roussel alleged that when he told Virenque of Voet being arrested, Virenque replied mes produits, comment Je vais faire maintenant? which could be translated as my products/stuff – what am I going to do now?

June 17, 1999: The organisers of the Tour de France announce the teams of the 1999 Tour de France where they take the unprecedented step of banning teams, team officials and individual riders. In the aftermath of the Festina affair, Virenque was banned together with his former teammate Hervé. Manolo Saiz, manager of ONCE–Deutsche Bank, Dr Nicolas Terrados team doctor of Team ONCE and the entire TVM–Farm Frites were also banned. This was in relation to the actions and behaviour of these teams and riders during the 1998 Tour.

== Festina trial ==
October 23, 2000: Start of the Festina trial with ten people charged, including:

- Richard Virenque, former Festina rider and team leader, charged with inciting the administration of doping and masking products to others and complicity in the importation of drugs. Virenque faced a two-year jail sentence and a fine of 100,000 francs.
- Bruno Roussel, former directeur sportif and manager of Festina, charged with helping and inciting the use of doping products in competition, importation, smuggling and improper circulation of prohibited substances as well as complicity in the importation, storage and acquisition of illegal substances.
- Willy Voet, former soigneur, charged with helping and inciting the use of doping in competition, unauthorized importation of drugs, complicity in smuggling and infringements of the narcotics law.
- Dr Erik Rijckaert, former Festina doctor, same charges as Roussel plus charged with administering doping products.
- Dr Nicolas Terrados, team doctor of ONCE at time of 1998 Tour de France and Festina trial, charged with unauthorized importation of drugs. The raid did not identify he possessed any EPO (as originally suspected), but that he was in possession of excessive quantities of the four medicines: Couldina (medicine to counter colds), Celestone (glucocorticoid steroid), Prednisone (cortico steroid), and Logradine (asthma medicine with Pseudoephedrine/Loratadine).
- Christine Paranier, pharmacist, charged with helping with the use of doping and infringements in public health law.
- Éric Paranier, pharmacist, same charges as Christine Paranier.
- Jef d'Hont, soigneur of La Française des Jeux team, charged with inciting the use of doping products and infringements of public health law.
- Jean Dalibot, former soigneur, same charges as Jef d'Hont as well as infringements to customs law.
- Joel Chabiron, former Festina communications officer, same charges as Jean Dalibot.

Witnesses included:

- Luc Leblanc
- Christophe Bassons
- Thomas Davy
- Laurent Brochard
- Hein Verbruggen
- Jean-Marie Leblanc

October 23, 2000: Erwann Menthéour's book, Secret Defonce: Ma vérité sur le dopage (February 1999) describes how he used EPO while riding for Française des Jeux in 1997, and stated that the soigneur of the Française des Jeux team, Jef d'Hont, was the one providing him with EPO and treating him with a glucose-infusion one hour ahead of a UCI hematocrit test in the 1997 edition of Paris–Nice, in a vain attempt to lower his hematocrit value below the 50%-limit. He also stated that his team manager Marc Madiot had been fully aware of his EPO use in 1997.

October 23, 2000: On the first day of the trial, Voet stated that he never let the hematocrit level of the riders exceed 54% whereas other teams were letting it go as high as 64%. This was under the order of team doctor Eric Rijckaert.

October 24, 2000: Virenque admitted to doping.

October 25, 2000: Pascal Hervé, Virenque's friend and the only other Festina rider to deny doping, admitted to doping.

October 27, 2000: Former rider Thomas Davy testified at the trial that the teams Castorama, Banesto, Team Telekom and La Française des Jeux had been running organized systematic doping programs, similar to the one revealed at the Festina Team. He knew that from riding at Castorama (1992–94), Banesto (1995–96) and Française des Jeux (1997). His use of EPO started in 1995, and continued until the end of his career, after the 1997 season. When asked if Miguel Induráin at Banesto had also used EPO, he said "I don't know. I didn't go into every room, but I think he did". He stated that Jef d'Hont as the person supplying him with EPO while he was riding for Française des Jeux in 1997.

November 1, 2000: On the stand UCI President Hein Verbruggen admitted that organised doping may exist. The following day several doctors of Spanish cycling teams refuted this statement. Jesús Hoyos (Banesto), Kepa Celaya (ONCE) and Eufemiano Fuentes (Kelme doctor) spoke to the Spanish daily paper As to refute this statement. Fuentes would later emerge as the key figure in the Operación Puerto doping scandal.

December 22, 2000: Virenque was cleared from the criminal charge of "inciting the administration of doping and masking products to others and complicity in the importation of drugs". Voet was given a 10-month suspended sentence and a 30,000 franc fine. Bruno Roussel was given a suspended sentence of one year and a fine of 50,000 francs. Christine Paranier received a 30,000 francs fine (4,573 euros). Her husband Éric received a fine of 10,000 francs (around 1,500 euros). Jef d'Hont received a nine-month suspended sentence and a fine of 20,000 francs (around 3,000 euros). Jean Dalibot and Joel Chabiron received a five-month suspended sentence. Dr. Terrados was given a 30,000 francs fine. The case against Eric Rijckaert was dropped due to his deteriorating health; he died of cancer a month later.

December 30, 2000: Swiss cycling federation gave a nine-month ban to Virenque and a 4,000 Swiss franc fine.

== Books ==
Many books have been written about the Festina affair.

- Willy Voet, Massacre à la chaîne, Calmann-Lévy, 1999 ISBN 2-290-30062-4 translated as Breaking the Chain, ISBN 0-224-06056-2
- Bruno Roussel, Tour de vices, Hachette Littérature, 2001 ISBN 2-01-235585-4
- Richard Virenque (together with C. Eclimont & Guy Caput), Ma Vérité, Editions du Rocher, 1999 ISBN 978-2-268-03305-1
- Jean-François Quénet, Un cyclone nommé dopage: Les secrets du dossier Festina, Broché 1999 ISBN 978-2-263-02865-6
- Daniel Baal, Droit dans le Mur, Editions Glénat, 1999 ISBN 978-2-7234-3090-6
- Sylvie Voet, De la poudre aux yeux, Editions Michel Lafon, 2004 ISBN 2-7499-0132-4
- Eric Rijckaert, De Zaak Festina:het Recht van antwoord van Dokter Eric Ryckaert, Lannoo – Tirion, 2000 ISBN 90-209-3989-0

== TVM affair ==
In the French judicial system, the TVM affair treated as an independent court case, though it is often referred to as part of the Festina affair since French police executed the TVM raid, interrogated six TVM riders, held several TVM key staff in custody, and performed additional advanced doping tests during the Festina investigation. After the public prosecutor in Reims had prepared the case, the court arbitration was conducted during 28–31 May 2001, with Cees Priem (TVM manager), Andrei Mikhailov (TVM doctor) and Jan Moors (TVM soigneur) being charged for import, transport and possession of doping/drugs on French soil.

Main events:

- March 9, 1998: 104 EPO vials are seized by the French police from a TVM-car near the Spanish border, on its way back home from the Vuelta a Murcia race in Spain.
- July 18, 1998: The French newspaper Aujourd'hui (locally known as Le Parisien), which is owned by the Amaury Group, publish the story about the TVM-affair. Cees Priem admits the fact that some EPO vials indeed had been seized from a TVM-car, but insists that the event in no way was related to his cycling team.
- July 23, 1998: On the rest day of the Tour, the French police raided the Hotel De la Rocade in Pamiers, where the TVM team was staying. Cees Priem and Andrei Mikhailov are arrested. Four other TVM-members, including assistant team manager Hendrik Redant and the TVM mechanic who was driving the car with EPO vials in March 1998, are interrogated for several hours, but released again after the questioning.
- July 24, 1998: The prosecutor in Reims reports that masking agents and doping were found at some of TVM's team trucks and rented rooms at their hotel in Pamiers. Several months later, it was revealed that in addition to the seized substances, the police had also found traces of EPO in some used syringes in the trash cans located in the TVM rented hotel rooms. The riders in the peloton arranged a one-hour-long sit-down strike in the middle of stage 12, to protest that the police having held TVM-staff in custody overnight.
- July 27, 1998: Priem and Mikhailov are indicted for breaking the law on toxic substances, inciting use of doping substances, and violating the French customs legislation.
- July 28, 1998: French police raided the TVM hotel in Albertville, and arrested the TVM soigneur Jan Moors. The six remaining riders (Jeroen Blijlevens, Bart Voskamp, Servais Knaven, Steven de Jongh, Serguei Outschakov and Sergei Ivanov) are all escorted to the nearest hospital, where they are forced to submit some extra urine, blood and hair sampling. The police want to conduct some new advanced doping testing on the rider samples, as circumstantial evidence in a court case against the team for running an organized systematic doping program.
- July 29, 1998: The riders in the peloton protest again by not racing the stage, just rolling through and letting four TVM riders cross the finish line – some meters ahead of the peloton. ASO consequently decided to cancel the stage.
- July 30, 1998: The first TVM-rider, Jeroen Blijlevens, decide to abandon the Tour prematurely when the route crosses the Swiss border. At the same day, Moors was also transferred by the police from Albertville to the prison in Reims.
- July 31, 1998: The five remaining TVM-riders decide to abandon the Tour.
- Aug. 3, 1998: The six TVM-riders who were tested on July 28 are called in for a second interrogation along with eight additional TVM-staffs. As French law does not prosecute riders for doping use, and as none of those interrogated in the second round could be charged for doping trafficking, selling, administration or incentives/facilitation, they were all released again.
- Aug. 10, 1998: On basis of interrogations and the seizure of masking and doping products at the raids on July 23+28, the police decides to prolong the jailing of Mikhailov and the detaining of Priem and Moors. Priem and Moors are however transferred from prison to a more relaxing "house arrest" at a hotel in Reims.
- Aug. 20, 1998: As part of the investigation, the police in Reims decides to interrogate a further seven TVM riders (Michel Lafis, Tristan Hoffman, Hendrik Van Dijck, Peter Van Petegem, Laurent Roux, Johan Capiot and Lars Michaelsen), and by same occasion collect samples of their hair, urine and blood, in order to also test those riders for potential doping use.
- Nov. 10, 1998: The newspaper Aujourd'hui report that the advanced extra doping tests conducted on samples of the interrogated TVM riders, now have returned several positives for EPO, anabolic steroids, growth hormones, corticosteroids, amphetamines and cannabis.
- Nov. 25, 1998: Priem is interrogated.
- Nov. 26, 1998: Moors and Mikhailov are interrogated.
- Nov. 27, 1998: The investigation chief calls eight of the previously tested TVM-riders (Blijlevens, Voskamp, Knaven, Outschakov, Lafis, Hoffman, Van Dijck and Van Petegem) in for a second interrogation in Reims, as he want to confront them with a positive test result from their submitted samples. In regards of Peter Van Petegem, it was noted some of the new scientific doping tests used by the police had found traces of EPO and anabolic steroids in his hair and blood samples from 20 August 1998. Van Petegem, who would risk losing his World Championship silver medal if found guilty of having doped, confidently announced he would refute all test results, arguing that he could not be convicted guilty by some newly developed scientific doping tests – not yet certified by IOC/UCI.
- Dec. 3, 1998: The eight TVM-riders mentioned above, are interrogated and free to leave again after 6 hours.
- Dec. 4, 1998: Priem and Moors are released from their long house arrest and now allowed to travel home to the Netherlands, and the team doctor Mikhailov is also released after paying a bailout fee to the court.
- May 10, 1999: The French lawyer, Lavelot, who defended the imprisoned TVM staff in 1998, is now himself suspected and being accused for being involved in doping trafficking. The TVM-team release a press statement, that they immediately have stopped all collaboration with the lawyer.
- June 16, 1999: Jean-Marie Leblanc, chief of the Tour organization, decides not to invite TVM and Richard Virenque as participants in the next edition of the Tour, because he still consider them as being tainted from unsolved doping allegations in the TVM affair and Festina affair. He also decides not to invite these two other riders with unsolved cases: Laurent Roux and Philippe Gaumont, along with the ONCE team's manager Manolo Saiz and doctor Nicolás Terrados. Virenque's Team Polti then appealed to UCI against this decision, and UCI then decided to force the Tour organization to accept that Virenque and Saiz can start in the upcoming edition of the Tour. The decision to boycott the TVM team along with Roux and Gaumont was however accepted.
- Dec. 7, 1999: ASO decides after having received guarantees that the TVM-team will employ a new manager, that the team will be invited for the 2000 Tour de France.
- Jan. 7, 2000: Cees Priem is replaced by Jacques Hanegraaf as team manager. The team lost TVM as sponsor, but continue with the new sponsor name Farm Frites.

TVM trial:

- May 28, 2001: The prosecutor first presented the test results for the seized products: The content of three seized medical suitcases had included 12 full vials with ACTH corticosteroids, caffeine tablets and ventoline (salbutamol); and empty vials/syringes found in the dustbins at two hotel rooms rented by TVM contained traces of recombinant EPO and a "homemade cocktail" (presumably comprising anabolic steroids, growth hormones and amphetamines). Dr. Françoise Bressolle (responsible for analysis of blood samples) and Dr.Pépin (responsible for analysis of hair and urine samples) then presented the analysis results for the 12 tested TVM riders. Dr. Bressol stated "It is very likely that four TVM riders (Jeroen Blijlevens, Bart Voskamp, Servais Knaven and Serguei Outschakov) used EPO in the 1998 Tour", as their blood samples from 28 July 1998 showed a relatively high hematocrit value and a remarkably low natural production of red blood cells (Outschakov=3.9, Knaven=4.6, Blijlevens=4.8, Voskamp=5.1) – while the iron content in the blood at the same time indicated such high hematocrit values could only stem from injection of medical EPO. Bressolle further clarified scientific studies had proofed, that a low natural production of red blood cells along with high hematocrit and iron values, always was visible in blood samples starting from 5–6 days after having injected medical EPO, and thus the riders displaying this test pattern in their blood were "very likely" to have injected medical EPO. In regards of the earlier referred to "EPO indication" for Peter Van Petegem, this was something Bressolle on the other hand argued should be classified as "doubtful values", rather than "positive indication".
  Urine samples had been corticosteroids positive for Jeroen Blijlevens and Bart Voskamp (according to the Trouw newspaper), while the NRC newspaper reported Jeroen Blijlevens, Serguei Outschakov and Laurent Roux to have been positive for this substance. Finally all sources reported, that Dr.Pépin with certainty also had detected amphetamine traces in the samples of two TVM riders (Tristan Hoffman and Laurent Roux), who were both tested out-of-competition on 20 August 1998; and in the urine sample of Laurent Roux he also detected the recreational drug cannabis. The last piece of incriminating evidence was a seized book accounting, proving that all TVM riders annually paid the team doctor 7.5% of their total prize money as a fee for "common purchase of medicines", which the testimonies of Roux, Hoffman and Van Petegem later on had also confirmed.
- May 28, 2001: The defendants lawyer answered that the 12 corticosteroid vials had been solely intended for Blijlevens, Voskamp and Outschakov, who at that point of time had carried a Temporary Use Exemption (TUE) for this treatment, due to racing with some unhealed injuries. He also noted Laurent Roux had used it early in the Tour, due to riding with an injury. No explanation was given for the traces of medical EPO and "homemade cocktail" in the garbage. In regards of the two riders found positive for amphetamines (Tristan Hoffman and Laurent Roux), he believed the amounts were so small, that they likely stemmed from a use of pain-killers during some of the days where the two riders were not racing. If the traces indeed could be proofed to origin from an intake of pure amphetamines, he pointed out the doping list anyway still had not prohibited such use of recreational drugs – as long as it only happened out of competition, which he in any case claimed it did. A third possible legal route for Tristan Hoffman's positive amphetamine test (found when analyzing his hair), was also suggested to have been stemming from a groin surgery he underwent ahead of the 1998 season. In regards of the four riders showing indication of EPO use, his only counter argument was, that Dr. Bressol only spoke of "probabilities" and could not "proof the EPO use as a certain fact". Finally he claimed the "medicine fee" paid by all riders on the team, was solely used for buying vitamins and minerals.
- May 29, 2001: The prosecutor upheld his indictment of Andrei Mikhailov, Cees Priem and Jan Moors, all being charged for: "Importation, possession and transportation of poisonous materials; incentives and facilitation of doping products; as well as breach of customs legislation on the holding and movement of hazardous materials", with Mikhailov in addition being charged for: "administration of doping and illegal practice of medicine". Andrei Mikhailov (former TVM doctor) maintained his previous claim, that the 104 EPO vials being seized from the TVM-car near the Spanish border in March 1998, was something he had bought himself as a charity gift to a children's hospital in Russia for the purpose of treating children with leukemia, and then attempted to proof his claim by submitting an undated fax send to a Russian doctor. Moreover, he claimed the reason he had removed the EPO name stickers from all vials, was not because he intended to mislead anybody, but simply because he did not want any riders to worry about the content of his package. When the prosecutor asked him why he had also opted to remove the small medical description pages, which by law is required always to follow dangerous medicines with possible negative counter effects on health, he provided no explanation for that.
- July 17, 2001: Despite pleading not guilty, the three TVM staffs were convicted guilty of providing performance-enhancing drugs in an organized way to a majority of its nine Tour riders, ahead and during the 1998 Tour de France. The court handed out the following punishment:
  - Cees Priem (TVM's manager), who had organized the doping, was given an 18-month suspended sentence and fined 80,000 francs (€12,070).
  - Andrei Mikhailov (TVM's doctor), who was found to have supervised the doping, got a 12-month suspended sentence and fined 60,000 francs (€9,053).
  - Jan Moors (TVM's soigneur), who was found to have assisted the doping practice, received a six-month suspended sentence and a fine of 40,000 francs (€6,035).
  - The three convicted persons above, were also fined a total of 50,000 francs (€7,544) for being guilty of violating the customs law on "import of hazardous substances".

== See also ==
- Doping at the 1998 Tour de France
