= Hein Verbruggen =

Dutch sports administrator

- Born: 21 June 1941; Helmond, Netherlands
- Died: 14 June 2017 (aged 75); Leuven, Belgium
- Education: Nyenrode Business Universiteit
- Occupation: Sports administrator

Hein Verbruggen (21 June 1941 – 14 June 2017) was a Dutch sports administrator who was president of the Union Cycliste Internationale (UCI) from 1991 until 2005 and president of SportAccord from 2004 to 2013. He was an honorary member of the International Olympic Committee (IOC) since 2008. Previously, he was a member of the IOC and Chairman of the Coordination Commission for the Games of the XXIX Olympiad in Beijing in 2008. He is highly suspected to have protected Lance Armstrong.

== Biography ==
Born in Helmond, Verbruggen studied at the Nyenrode Business Universiteit. Afterwards, he became a sales manager. In 1970, when he was a sales manager at Mars, Incorporated, he convinced them to sponsor a cycling team, to get access to the Belgian market. In 1975, he became a member of the professional cycling committee of the Royal Dutch Cycling Union (KNWU).

In 1979, Verbruggen became a member of the board of the Fédération Internationale de Cyclisme Professionnel (FICP). He became vice-president in 1982, and president in 1984.

From 1991 to 2005, Verbruggen was president of the UCI. From 1996 on, he was also member of the IOC. During that time, Verbruggen combined the FICP (for professional cyclists) and the FIAC (for amateur cyclists) in the UCI. Because the Olympic organisation had the FIAC as partners, it had been impossible before then for professional cyclists to enter the Olympic Games, but from the 1996 Summer Olympics, professional athletes could compete. In his last year, he launched the UCI ProTour.

In 2005, Verbruggen became Officer in the Order of Orange-Nassau. Later that year, Verbruggen resigned as president of the UCI, and became vice-president. He then stopped being a member of the IOC, but was reinstated during the 2006 Winter Olympics.

After the 2008 Summer Olympics, Verbruggen resigned from the UCI management committee and as member of the IOC. The IOC then made him an honorary member, as did the Dutch Olympic Committee.

As of 2005, Verbruggen remained an "honorary president" of the UCI.

== Titles and honours ==
- Honorary UCI-President (since 2005)
- Honorary IOC- Member (since 2008)
- Honorary Member Dutch Olympic Committee (NOC*NSF)
- Honorary Member Royal Dutch Cycling Federation (KNWU-1994)
- Officer in the Order of Oranje-Nassau (since 2005)
- Honorary Citizen of the City of Beijing (since 2009)
- Most influential Overseas Expert in China over the past 30 years (2008)
- Honorary SportAccord President (since 2013)

== Defamation suits ==
Verbruggen (sometimes along with Pat McQuaid) has been involved in several defamation suits against people who accused UCI of corruption in regard to doping.

In 2002 UCI sued Festina soigneur Willy Voet for defamation over claims in his book Breaking the Chain. In 2004 the UCI won the case, and in 2006 won the appeal. Voet had made various claims about UCI and Verbruggen's alleged behavior related to an alleged issue with Lidocaine and Laurent Brochard at the 1997 UCI Road World Championships.

Another defamation suit was brought against Floyd Landis in 2011 for some of the aforementioned claims about Lance Armstrong and the UCI. The case against Landis was ruled in UCI's favor.

Another defamation lawsuit was against WADA Chief Dick Pound regarding his comments about doping and UCI. The lawsuit was settled by the parties in 2009. Pound retracted his comments and acknowledged that the UCI was "doing good work to eliminate cheats from their sport."

Another was filed by the UCI, Pat McQuaid and Hein Verbruggen against former cyclist and journalist Paul Kimmage in 2012, again related to the accusations about Armstrong and UCI. The lawsuit was later dropped by the UCI and Pat McQuaid but not by Verbruggen. On 26 May 2016, the judge ruled once more in favour of Hein Verbruggen by prohibiting Paul Kimmage to affirm that Hein Verbruggen knowingly tolerated doping or to make any allegations of the same kind. The Judge also forbade Paul Kimmage to claim that Hein Verbruggen hid controls, is dishonest, did not behave responsibly, did not apply the same rules for all, did not chase Lance Armstrong after he had provided an antedated certificate. The Judge also sentenced Paul Kimmage to pay Hein Verbruggen 12.000 Swiss Francs; covering his legal fees. Paul Kimmage was also ordered to publish corrections in several papers.

In addition Kimmage, who had received money from the public to prepare a defence, decided to sue Verbruggen himself in a criminal court. He stated that he was doing it for the whistleblowers who were defamed by the UCI. The public prosecutor ruled that there was no case and dismissed Kimmage's complaint. Kimmage appealed the decision to the court and the court once more decided in favour of Verbruggen.

== Controversy ==
In July 2008, a BBC investigation found documents indicating that over three million dollars were paid by Japanese race organizers as reimbursements for UCI expenses during Verbruggen's tenure as president, including five flights to the Netherlands for Verbruggen personally in 1999. The investigation cited sources within the UCI who confirmed that the repayments were "explicitly a payback for getting keirin into the Games". Verbruggen denied any wrongdoing and a UCI press release of 28 July 2008 explained that contracts had been signed with Japanese cycling groups wanting to invest in the development of track cycling and that this matter was unrelated to the inclusion of keirin, together with three other track disciplines, in the Olympic Games. These inclusions had already been decided by the IOC six months earlier. No evidence has ever been produced to back up the claim. In the 2015 report of the Cycling Independent Reform Commission it was once more confirmed there was no issue.

For the 2008 Summer Olympics in Beijing, IOC President Jacques Rogge announced in mid-July 2008 that there would be no Internet censorship by the mainland authorities: "for the first time, foreign media will be able to report freely and publish their work freely in China. " However, by 30 July 2008, IOC spokesman Kevan Gosper announced that the Internet would indeed be censored for journalists. Gosper, who said he had not heard about this, suggested that high IOC officials (probably including the Dutch Hein Verbruggen and Swiss IOC Executive Director, Gilbert Felli – and most likely with Rogge's knowledge) had made a secret deal with Chinese officials to allow the censorship, without the knowledge of either the press or most members of the IOC. Rogge later denied that any such meeting had taken place, but did not insist that China adhere to its prior assurances that the Internet would not be censored.

In May 2010, Floyd Landis accused Verbruggen of accepting a $100,000 bribe from Lance Armstrong to cover-up a positive dope control in 2001. Verbruggen denied the allegation, but confirmed that Armstrong representatives had approached the UCI with the intention of donating money. Verbruggen indicated that Armstrong's money would not have gone toward testing, but may have been used to purchase a Sysmex machine to analyze blood samples. Pat McQuaid, Verbruggen's successor as UCI president, later confirmed that Armstrong made two donations during Verburggen's tenure: a personal check for $25,000 in 2002, which went toward doping controls for junior racers, and a $100,000 donation from Armstrong's management company in 2005, which went toward the Sysmex machine. Given UCI's endorsement of USADA's decision that the donation was made by the leader of one of the most sophisticated, systematic and successful doping programs in sporting history, for the express purpose of improving doping controls, Verbruggen's acceptance of the donation has not been without controversy. McQuaid also conceded that the UCI's acceptance of Armstrong's money may have been a mistake. The Cycling Independent Reform Commission concluded in February 2015 that Lance Armstrong did not test positive and confirmed that it didn't find any indication of a financial agreement or corruption.

In July 2010, an email correspondence between Landis and Verbruggen was leaked to The New York Daily News, in which Verbruggen attacked Landis in the wake of accusations Landis made about the UCI and Lance Armstrong. The e-mails were later reproduced at Cyclingnews.com.

USADA's "reasoned decision" on Lance Armstrong quotes Verbruggen as saying in May 2011: "There is nothing. I repeat again: Lance Armstrong has never used doping. Never, never, never. I say this not because I am a friend of his, because that is not true. I say it because I'm sure." Verbruggen stated that he never said that Armstrong had never used doping, but that Armstrong never tested positive, as was correctly reported by AP on 8 June 2010. In March 2013, it was revealed that Hein Verbruggen while in charge of Summer 2008 Olympics bids at sometime in the early 2000s demanded France to adapt its anti-doping laws to bring them in line with the anti-doping rules of the IOC during the Olympic Games. The sports minister at the time, Marie-George Buffet, was later instructed by the prime minister after meetings with other IOC representatives to deliver a letter agreeing to this adaptation. English summary: When Paris lost its bid to Beijing, certain French media falsely suggested that the Agreement was related to relaxing doping rules whereas the agreement was clearly related to bringing the French rules in line with those of the IOC during games time (a prerequisite for all Olympic Games).

In July 2013, it was revealed that from 2001 to 2004, Verbruggen had some of his money managed by the owner of USA Cycling and part owner of the United States Postal Service professional cycling team, Thom Weisel. The broker was Jim Ochowicz, former President of the USA Cycling Board of Directors and team manager of the BMC professional bicycle racing team.

== See also ==
- SportAccord
