= Richard Virenque =

French cyclist

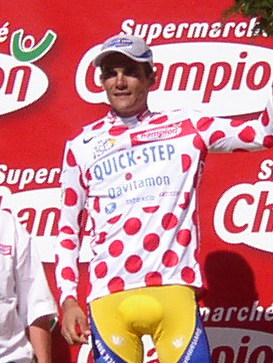
- Virenque at the 2003 Tour de France

Personal information
- Full name: Richard Virenque
- Nickname: Ricco
- Born: 19 November 1969 (age 56) Casablanca, Morocco
- Height: 1.79 m (5 ft 10 1/2 in)
- Weight: 65 kg (143 lb; 10 st 3 lb)

Cycling career
- Sport: Cycling
- Discipline: Road
- Role: Rider
- Rider type: Climbing specialist

Professional teams
- 1991–1992: RMO
- 1993–1998: Festina–Lotus
- 1999–2000: Team Polti
- 2001–2002: Domo–Farm Frites–Latexco
- 2003–2004: Quick-Step–Davitamon

Major wins
- Grand Tours Tour de France Mountains classification (1994–1997, 1999, 2003, 2004) 7 individual stages (1994, 1995, 1997, 2000, 2002–2004) Giro d'Italia 1 individual stage (1999) One-Day Races and Classics Paris–Tours (2001)
Medal record
Representing France
Men's road bicycle racing
World Championships
Bronze medal – third place	1994 Agrigento	Elite Men's Road Race

Richard Virenque (Note: Richard Virenque's name is pronounced Ree-shah Vee-rahnk. Virenque considers himself a man of the South but pronounces his name in standard French. Confusion is caused by the southern habit of pronouncing "en" as "ang" or "eng", making it Vee-rank. But Virenque says Vee-rahnk or Vee-ronk, a sound difficult to write in English.) (born 19 November 1969) is a retired French professional road racing cyclist. He was one of the most popular French riders with fans, known for his boyish personality and his long, lone attacks. (Note: Virenque's fan club in 2000, two years after the Festina scandal had 5,000 members, of whom 2,000 were described as active. In 2000, Virenque received 589 letters in three weeks during the Tour de France, more than any other rider.) He was a climber, best remembered for winning the King of the Mountains competition of the Tour de France a record seven times, and as one of the central figures in a widespread doping scandal in 1998, the Festina Affair.

== Childhood ==
Virenque, his parents, his brother Lionel and sister Nathalie lived in the Iseba district of Casablanca. The family was affluent, employing both a gardener and a nurse. His mother described Richard as a gentle, kind boy, full of life, who enjoyed helping her in the garden. His idol was Michael Jackson. His father, Jacques, ran a tire company. As a child, Virenque began cycling by riding round the garden of the family's house. "It wasn't much of a bike," he said. "It had no mudguards, no brakes, and I had to scrape my foot along the ground to stop." Virenque often skipped school to fish on the beach. He told a court during the Festina doping inquiry (see below):

"I soon realised that I didn't have the brain to be anything but a racing cyclist."

The family moved to La Londe-les-Maures, near the Côte d'Azur, in 1979 when he was nine. There his father failed to find the same sort of job and relations between his parents suffered. Jacques and Bérangère Virenque (Note: Virenque's mother, Bérangère, was born in the Alpes-Maritimes region of France, the daughter of a public works entrepreneur. She moved to Morocco when she was young and spent her childhood there. She gained qualifications as a hairdresser and beautician but never worked, at the request of her father and of her husband.) divorced soon afterwards and Virenque said he was devastated.

"That [my parents divorce] was a difficult moment. I had only my bike, and I took to it in depth."

He couldn't stand being in school any longer than he had to, he said, and he left to work as a plumber.

"I studied for my qualifications but they were only an excuse [to leave school]. I used to go cycling rather than attend my classes."

== Early career ==
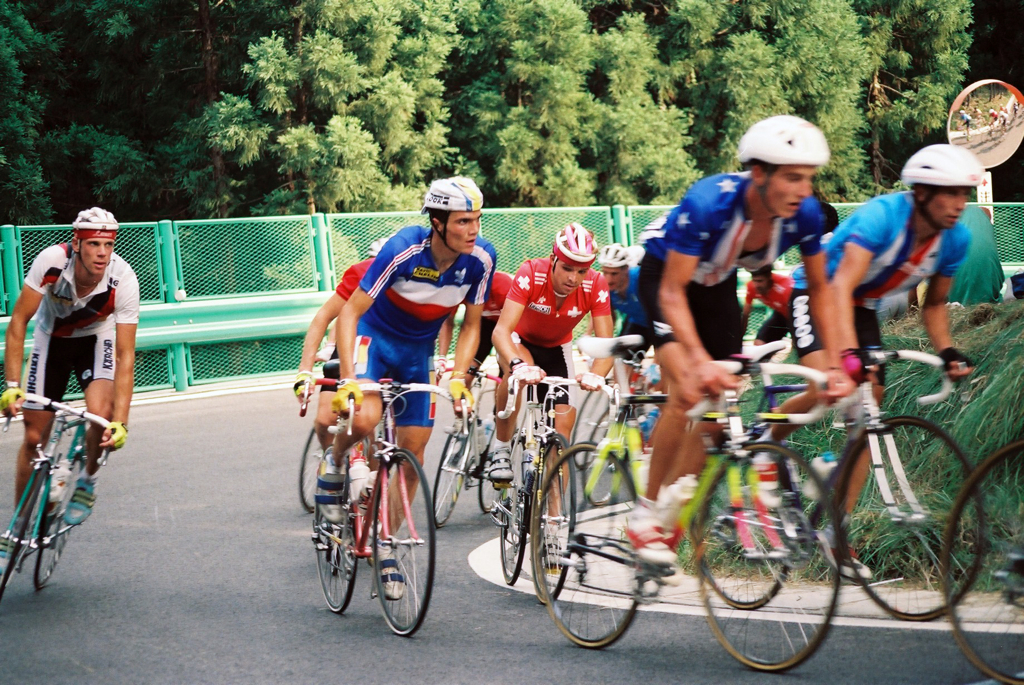
Virenque (second from the left) during the amateur race at the 1990 UCI Road World Championships

Cycle-racing did not immediately inspire Virenque. His brother, Lionel, cycled, read specialist magazines and watched the Tour de France on television.

"But [racing and the Tour de France] didn't interest me at all, until the day he [my brother] took me to see a race and I signed up with a cycling school [école de cyclisme]." (Note: Many cycling clubs in France have separate sections for riders as young as seven or eight in which coaches introduce and instruct them in cycling. The sections are referred to as cycling schools.)

He rode for the Vélo Club Hyèrois from the age of 13 where, encouraged by his grandfather, he took out his first licence with the Fédération Française de Cyclisme He said he knew he could climb well from the start.

"My shorts used to flap round me in those days and my bike was too big for me. On the flat, I clung to the wheels in front as best I could, but the moment there was a hill, I left the others. I've always had that pleasure."

His first win was in a race round the town at La Valette-du-Var, when he and another rider, Pascale Ranucci, lapped the field. He then did his national service in the army battalion at Joinville in Paris to which talented sportsmen were often sent. (Note: Laurent Jalabert had already done his national service in the army's 'sports specialist' battalion at Joinville in Paris; Jean-Cyril Robin, Eddy Seigneur, Philippe Ermenault and others were there at the same time as Virenque. Robin recalled a quiet, thoughtful man who, the moment anything started, dedicated himself to it. "He really joined in war exercises," he told Vélo. He remembered an incident when Virenque walked across a frozen lake for a bet, followed by a hail of stones and rocks in an effort to break the ice.) He spent his last period as an amateur with the ASPTT (Note: ASPTT — Association Sportive Poste Téléphones Télégrams, a national grouping of sports clubs associated with the former PTT, the national communications organisation. The ASPTT still exists but without its former close links to the post office.) in Paris.

In 1990 he came eighth in the world championship road race at Utsunomiya, Tochigi in Japan, riding une course d'enfer (Note: Colloquially, riding une course d'enfer would translate as "like a bat out of hell.") to impress Marc Braillon, the head of the professional team, RMO, said Pascal Lino. "I was riding like a kamikaze. I rode out of my skin," Virenque said. It worked: Braillon offered him a contract.

== Professional career ==
Richard Virenque, King of the Mountains, 1999

He turned professional for RMO in January 1991. Virenque rode his first Tour de France in 1992 as a replacement for another team member, Jean-Philippe Dojwa. He was earning 15,000 francs a month. He said he dreamed only of "being able to follow the best in the mountains, riders like Claudio Chiappucci, Indurain, LeMond, Thierry Claveyrolat." On the third day he took the yellow jersey as leader of the general classification after a long breakaway with two other riders on the col de Marie-Blanque in the Pyrenees. He held it for a day, losing it next day to his team-mate Pascal Lino, who led for the next two weeks. Virenque finished second in the climbers' competition.

Virenque was sought by several teams after his first Tour and Cyrille Guimard said at the world championship at Benidorm that he had arranged for him to join his Castorama team, where he would replace Laurent Fignon. But the announcement was premature and Virenque joined another French team, Festina. He stayed there until the team dissolved in the wake of a doping scandal in 1998 (see below).

Virenque first wore the yellow jersey of the Tour de France in 1992 and for the last time in 2003. In 2003 he won the stage to Morzine and wore the jersey on the climb of Alpe d'Huez. Virenque was a talented climber but a modest time-triallist. He was coached for time-trials by Jeannie Longo and her husband.

Virenque finished twice on the podium in the Tour de France (third in 1996 and second in 1997) and won several stages, among them Mont Ventoux in 2002. He is the 18th rider in the Tour to have won stages over 10 years apart; (Note: The other riders who have won stages over 10 years apart were Jean Alavoine, Henri Pélissier, Philippe Thys, Louis Mottiat, André Leducq, Antonin Magne, René Vietto, Gino Bartali, André Darrigade, Jean Stablinski, Raymond Poulidor, Felice Gimondi, Gerben Karstens, Ferdinand Bracke, Joaquim Agostinho, Lucien Van Impe and Lance Armstrong. The 19th to have done it is Cédric Vasseur.) he wore the Maillot Jaune for two days in his entire career.

== Festina affair ==
In 1998 the Festina cycling team was disgraced by a doping scandal (see Doping at the Tour de France) after a soigneur, Willy Voet, was found when crossing from Belgium to France to have drugs used for doping. They were, said John Lichfield, the Paris correspondent of The Independent in Britain: "235 doses of erythropoietin (EPO), an artificial hormone which boosts the red cells (and therefore endurance) but can thicken the blood to fatal levels if not controlled properly. They also found 82 doses of a muscle-strengthening hormone called Sauratropine; 60 doses of Pantestone, a derivative of testosterone, which boosts body strength but can cause cancer; and sundry pain-deadening corticoids and energy-fuelling amphetamines." Bruno Roussel, Virenque's directeur sportif, told L'Équipe that Virenque responded to the news by saying:

"Mes produits, comment je vais faire maintenant?" - "My products/stuff , how am I going to manage now?"

Virenque's teammates, Christophe Moreau, Laurent Brochard and Armin Meier, admitted taking EPO after being arrested during the Tour and were disqualified. Virenque maintained his innocence.

"I am the best climber in the world and he [Virenque] just wears the polkadot jersey."

— Marco Pantani

While his former team-mates were served six-month suspensions and returned to racing in spring 1999, Virenque changed teams to Polti in January 1999 and prepared for the 1999 Tour by riding the Giro d'Italia, in which he won a stage. Another Italian, his team-mate Enrico Cassani, said Virenque was referred to in Italy as "the shit". He said: "When he arrived, we were originally against him. Then, very quickly, we saw he knew how to live and to joke and we respected him. He proved he had some character, some personality."

A few weeks later Virenque's name emerged in an inquiry into Bernard Sainz, the so-called Dr Mabuse of cycling who was later jailed for practising as an unqualified doctor. Franco Polti, the head of Virenque's team, fined him 30 million lire.

Race director Jean-Marie Leblanc banned Virenque from the 1999 Tour de France but was obliged to accept him after a ruling by the Union Cycliste Internationale.

Cycling Weekly in Britain called it "a major blow" to the Tour's organisers. Leblanc said he hoped Virenque would not win. (Note: Virenque had been asked to stay away from the 1999 Tour de France along with Manolo Saiz, manager of a Spanish team who in withdrawing his riders from the 1998 Tour said he had "stuffed [his] finger up the Tour's arse." Virenque's lawyers depended on a clause in the UCI's rules, number 1.2.048, which says tour organisers must say at least 30 days before a race whom they wished to admit. The Tour had not done so. The UCI also obliged the Tour to accept Saiz.)

Virenque rode, at his team's request, on a bicycle painted white with red dots to resemble the polka dot jersey worn by the leader of the mountains classification and he travelled between stages with a bodyguard, Gilles Pagliuca. That year, he wrote Ma Vérité, a book which asserted his innocence and included comments of how doping must be fought. He wrote that his team-mates confessed to using EPO because of pressure from the police. He said Moreau's urine showed EPO had not been detected.

The Festina affair led to a trial in Lille, northern France, in October 2000. Virenque was a witness with others from the former Festina team. He at first denied he had doped himself but then confessed. "Oui, je me suis dopé", he told the court's president, Daniel Delegove, on 24 October. But he denied doping himself intentionally. Voet said he was aware of what he was doing and participated in trafficking between cyclists. Virenque said this happened without his approval. That led the satirical television programme, Les Guignols de l'info - which displayed Virenque as a moronic rubber puppet with hypodermics in his head - to change his words to "à l'insu de mon plein gré" ("willingly but without knowing"), and the phrase passed into French popular culture as a sign of hypocritical denial. (Note: The phrase "willingly but without knowing" returns in a later sketch by 'Les Guignols de l'info', in which Virenque mistakes tennis player Amélie Mauresmo for a cyclist: video at http://video.google.com/videoplay?docid=-1203579429921376149) Voet wrote a book, Massacre à la Chaîne, published in a legally-censored English edition as Breaking the Chain, in which he came close to identifying Virenque as an unrepentant doper.

== Post-trial reaction ==
"For sheer effrontery, Virenque's denial for over two years that he had knowingly taken drugs, in the face of overwhelming evidence to the contrary, took some beating."

— William Fotheringham writing in The Guardian

Virenque was criticised by the media and satirists for his denial in the face of increasing evidence and his pretence of having been doped without his knowledge. Voet wrote in Le Journal du Dimanche that he preferred Virenque as a young pro "because he didn't dope himself much". Many former colleagues shunned him, remembering his arrogance and criticism.

Virenque lived near Geneva in Switzerland and the Swiss cycling association suspended him for nine months. The president of the committee which imposed the ban, Bernard Welten, said he deserved a severe penalty because he was one of the biggest drug-takers in the team. The president of the French federation, Daniel Baal, said nine months was halfway between the minimum penalty of six months and the maximum of a year for a first-time offence. The sentence was reduced by an independent tribunal to six and a half. He was fined the equivalent of 2,600 euros and told to pay 1,300 euros in costs. He became depressed. "I had to realise that I wasn't anything any more," he said. His wife Stéphanie said he put on two sizes in clothes and 10 kg (22 lb) more than his racing weight. (Note: The extra weight has been much quoted but Virenque told a meeting of readers of the French magazine, Vélo, that it wasn't unusual for him to put on that much weight in the winter.) He wept repeatedly. She said she would stay with him and support him only if they moved back in the south of France after four years in Switzerland.

In the meantime they had the help of a prominent neighbour, Laurent Jalabert. The two had not been friends and did not see each other much in Switzerland. Then, Jalabert opened links by getting his wife, Sylvie, to ask Stéphanie Virenque for the loan of a vacuum cleaner that she didn't actually need. Jalabert said that later, "Richard called me one day when my wife and I were getting ready to move house. He was desperate to help us even though we didn't really need any help. It was then that I realised his distress. He spent the whole day taking the furniture apart and putting it back together again. It's odd, but that day did him an awful lot of good." Jalabert and his wife Sylvie said that, as a souvenir, they had kept the doors of one of their closets upside down because that was the way Virenque had fitted them. The two men began training together. (Note: Virenque began training with Jalabert who was recovering from a fall while working on his house. Virenque said they made their comeback rides together, although he said he was in the worse shape "I was in a rotten condition physically and my heart suffered at the slightest effort and my muscles had melted.") Virenque and his family moved back to France as his wife asked. Jalabert followed shortly after his own career ended.

== Post-suspension career ==
One of Virenque's devoted army of supporters

Few teams were willing to consider him when he completed his suspension and only a few friends kept in touch.

Cofidis was said to be interested but not in his first year back. Jean Delatour, with whom Virenque trained in the winter, (Note: The 'Jean Delatour' team told L'Équipe in January 2001 that Virenque had ridden with its riders only because the team was holding a training camp in Virenque's region and that he had come only to see friends) said it could be interested if it found more sponsorship. On 5 July 2001 he joined Domo-Farm Frites, with the help of the former Tour de France winner, Eddy Merckx who, as supplier of the team's bikes, put up the extra money that the main sponsors would not. He was paid the equivalent of £800 a month, the minimum wage, for the last three months of the year and the same salary for which he had first turned professional in 1992. Domo kept him the following season, after Farm Frites withdrew as co-sponsor, because it wanted to expand its carpet business in France. On 25 October 2002, on the eve of the Tour de France presentation at the Palais des Congres in Paris, he signed for another two years.

Virenque returned to prominence by winning Paris–Tours on 7 October 2001 in a day-long breakaway in which he dropped Jacky Durand and crossed the line seconds ahead of the peloton. Paris–Tours is a flat race that favours sprinters and not climbers. "It was a typical Virenque moment," Fotheringham wrote, "with a yell of anger as he crossed the line 'for all those who tried to destroy me'". The French magazine, Vélo, called the victory "extraordinary." L'Équipe's one-word headline on the front page was "Unbelievable!" Virenque said: "Jacky asked me if we should sit up [give up the breakaway attempt]. There were still 50 km [30 miles] to go. I was longing for someone else to come up to us. A long break wasn't the idea. But when I saw the gap was rising, I shouted' Faut y croire ' [We can do it/We have to believe] But he said he'd run dry."

While Virenque was bettered by Laurent Jalabert in the 2001 and 2002 Tour de France for the King of the Mountains competition, he won his sixth mountains classification in 2003 to tie with Federico Bahamontes and Lucien Van Impe. His day-long breakaway also saw him wear the yellow jersey as leader of the general classification. In 2004 he won the King of the Mountains for a record seventh time. Van Impe criticised Virenque for being opportunistic rather than the best climber; he said he had himself refrained from breaking Bahamontes' record himself out of reverence. Virenque said they were jealous: "They couldn't stand being equal best and they couldn't stand being beaten."

Bahamontes in turn described Virenque as "a great rider, but not a complete rider", and compares him unfavorably as a climber with Charly Gaul and Van Impe.

Virenque ran into trouble again in 2002 when he appeared on a television programme, Tout le Monde en Parle, in June. The presenter, Thierry Ardisson, asked him: "If you were sure of winning the Tour by being doped but knew you would not get caught, would you do it?" Virenque replied: "Win the Tour doped, but without getting caught? Yes." The programme was recorded to be broadcast as-live. Ardisson said that Virenque asked after the recording finished that his answer be cut out. Ardisson said: "It was very naive, very Virenque. But it's a shame that, once again, he didn't want to tell the truth."

== Retirement ==
Virenque rode the Olympic Games road race in Athens and decided to retire, a decision he announced at the Olympia theatre in Paris on 24 September 2004. His wife had suggested continuing one more season, he said. He stayed in the public eye, winning Je suis une célébrité, sortez-moi de là! (the French version of I'm a Celebrity... Get Me Out of Here!) in Brazil in April 2006. In autumn 2005 he opened Virenque Design, a company to design and sell jewellery often featuring the number 7, representing his wins in the King of the Mountains. Since 2005 he has been a consultant commentator for Eurosport, alongside Jacky Durand and Jean-François Bernard and the journalist, Patrick Chassé, where he is described as a "modest competitor" to Laurent Jalabert, the specialist on the rival state network. He has also promoted an energy drink and a pharmacy company.

Virenque also took part in the Spa 24 Hours endurance race in 2005. Driving a Dodge Viper GTS-R for Force One Racing alongside François Labhardt, Philippe Prette and former motorcycle rider Didier de Radiguès, he finished the race in 12th place overall and second in the G2 class.

On 11 August 2006, Virenque was taken to hospital at Moûtiers and transferred to Grenoble after falling during a mountain-bike race at Méribel. He broke his nose and needed 32 stitches to his face. Hitting his head led to feelings of worry and of depression, he said, and he lost his sense of smell.

== Personal life ==
In December 2007, Virenque and his wife, Stéphanie, divorced after 17 years together. They have two children, Clara and Dario.

Éric Boyer said of Virenque's retirement: "Richard has character, a strong personality. He doesn't let himself go. He looks forwards, never behind. Today, he is a personality [un people]. His return to everyday life has been a success but money isn't an end in itself."

Virenque lives at Carqueiranne in the Var region. He is fond of marmots, dancing, wine, gardening and flowers; he is quoted as saying, "Put me in a good garden nursery and I'm in heaven,"

== Career achievements ==
=== Major results ===
1991
2nd Trophée des Grimpeurs
7th Overall Route du Sud
7th Grand Prix de Cannes
9th Road race, National Road Championships
10th Tour du Haut Var
1992
1st Bol d'Or des Monédières Chaumeil
2nd Trophée des Grimpeurs
3rd Polynormande
4th Overall Tour du Limousin
6th Road race, National Road Championships
6th Grand Prix La Marseillaise
8th Overall Grand Prix du Midi Libre
8th Trofeo Pantalica
9th A Travers le Morbihan
Tour de France

Held after Stage 2

1993
2nd Overall Tour du Limousin

1st Stage 1

5th Overall Critérium du Dauphiné Libéré
1994
1st Trophée des Grimpeurs
1st Circuit de l'Aulne
2nd Overall Route du Sud

1st Stage 2

2nd GP Ouest–France
3rd Road race, UCI Road World Championships
5th Overall Tour de France

1st Mountains classification
1st Stage 12

5th Classique des Alpes
6th Overall Critérium du Dauphiné Libéré
6th Omloop Het Volk
7th Tour du Haut Var
8th Overall Four Days of Dunkirk
9th Amstel Gold Race
9th Coppa Placci
1995
1st Polynormande
1st Critérium de Castillon-la-Bataille
2nd Overall Grand Prix du Midi Libre
3rd Classique des Alpes
3rd Trophée des Grimpeurs
4th Overall Critérium du Dauphiné Libéré

1st Mountains classification
1st Stages 4 & 6

4th Overall Route du Sud
5th Overall Vuelta a España
6th Road race, UCI Road World Championships
8th Tour du Haut Var
9th Overall Tour de France

1st Mountains classification
1st Stage 15

10th Overall Four Days of Dunkirk
1996
1st Giro del Piemonte
1st Critérium de Vayrac
2nd Circuit de l'Aulne
3rd Overall Tour de France

1st Mountains classification

3rd Overall Critérium du Dauphiné Libéré

1st Mountains classification
1st Stage 4 (Mont Ventoux)

3rd Overall Grand Prix du Midi Libre
3rd Coppa Placci
4th Clásica de San Sebastián
4th Milano–Torino
4th Classique des Alpes
4th À travers Lausanne
5th Road race, Olympic Games
5th Road race, UCI Road World Championships
6th Overall Giro di Puglia
6th Coppa Sabatini
7th Overall UCI Road World Rankings
7th Giro di Lombardia
7th Trophée des Grimpeurs
8th Liège–Bastogne–Liège
10th Overall Critérium International
1997
1st Grand Prix d'Ouverture La Marseillaise
1st Polynormande
1st Critérium de Castillon-la-Bataille
1st Critérium de Vayrac
2nd Overall Tour de France

1st Mountains classification
1st Stage 14

2nd Tour du Haut Var
2nd Circuit de l'Aulne
5th Züri-Metzgete
6th GP Ouest–France
6th Trophée des Grimpeurs
6th Breitling Grand Prix (with Christophe Moreau)
7th Overall Vuelta a Burgos
7th Road race, National Road Championships
7th Grand Prix des Nations
7th Gran Premio Bruno Beghelli
8th Overall Tour Méditerranéen

1st Stage 2b (TTT)

9th Clásica de San Sebastián
10th La Flèche Wallonne
1998
1st Châteauroux Classic de l'Indre Trophée Fenioux
2nd Grand Prix d'Ouverture La Marseillaise
3rd Overall Tour Méditerranéen

1st Stage 4 (TTT)

3rd Road race, National Road Championships
4th Overall Grand Prix du Midi Libre
6th Overall Critérium du Dauphiné Libéré

1st Stage 6

6th Tour du Haut Var
10th Milano–Torino
10th Classique des Alpes
1999
1st Stage 13 Giro d'Italia
2nd Polynormande
4th Road race, National Road Championships
8th Overall Tour de France

1st Mountains classification

9th Klasika Primavera
2000
6th Overall Tour de France

1st Stage 16

6th Overall Tour de Suisse
2001
1st Paris–Tours
4th Giro di Lombardia
2002
1st Critérium de Castillon-la-Bataille
1st Stage 14 Tour de France (Mont Ventoux)
1st Mountains classification Tour Méditerranéen
2nd Overall Tour de l'Ain
3rd Overall Giro della Provincia di Lucca
9th Overall Critérium du Dauphiné Libéré
10th Overall Tour de Pologne
2003
Tour de France

1st Mountains classification
1st Stage 7
Held after Stage 7

2nd Road race, National Road Championships
2nd Châteauroux Classic de l'Indre Trophée Fenioux
5th Overall Tour de l'Ain
2004
1st Critérium de Castillon-la-Bataille
Tour de France

1st Mountains classification
1st Stage 10

=== Grand Tour general classification results timeline ===
Grand Tour	1992	1993	1994	1995	1996	1997	1998	1999	2000	2001	2002	2003	2004
Giro d'Italia	—	—	—	—	—	—	—	14	—	—	—	—	—
Tour de France	25	19	5	9	3	2	DSQ	8	6	—	16	16	15
Vuelta a España	—	—	—	5	—	—	11	—	16	24	—	DSQ	—

Legend
—	Did not compete
DNF	Did not finish
DSQ	Disqualified

==== Grand Tour record ====
	1992	1993	1994	1995	1996	1997	1998	1999	2000	2001	2002	2003	2004
Giro d'Italia	DNE	DNE	DNE	DNE	DNE	DNE	DNE	14	DNE	DNE	DNE	DNE	DNE
Stages won	—	—	—	—	—	—	—	1	—	—	—	—	—
Mountains classification	—	—	—	—	—	—	—	10	—	—	—	—	—
Tour de France	25	19	5	9	3	2	DSQ	8	6	DNE	16	16	15
Stages won	0	0	1	1	0	1	0	0	1	—	1	1	1
Points classification	NR	NR	12	18	9	8	DSQ	30	65	—	63	30	33
Mountains classification	2	5	1	1	1	1	DSQ	1	3	—	8	1	1
Young rider classification	2	3	2	—	—	—	—	—	—	—	—	—	—
Vuelta a España	DNE	DNE	DNE	5	DNE	DNE	11	DNE	16	24	DNE	DSQ	DNE
Points classification	—	—	—	NR	—	—	24	—	51	39	—	DSQ	—
Mountains classification	—	—	—	NR	—	—	NR	—	65	52	—	DSQ	—

Legend
1	Winner
2–3	Top three-finish
4–10	Top ten-finish
11–	Other finish
DNE	Did not enter
DNF-x	Did not finish (retired on stage x)
DNS-x	Did not start (not started on stage x)
HD-x	Finished outside time limit (occurred on stage x)
DSQ	Disqualified
N/A	Race/classification not held
NR	Not ranked in this classification

== Books ==
- Ma Vérité 1999 Éditions du Rocher, with C. Éclimont and Guy Caput.
- Plus fort qu'avant 2002 Robert Laffont, with Jean-Paul Vespini.
- Richard Virenque Cœur de Grimpeur Mes Plus Belles Étapes 2006 Privat, with Patrick Louis

== See also ==
- List of doping cases in cycling
- List of sportspeople sanctioned for doping offences
