= 1997 UCI Road World Championships =

Cycling world championships

- Venue: San Sebastián, Spain
- Date: 7–12 October 1997
- Coordinates: 43°19′17″N 1°59′8″W
- Events: 10

The 1997 UCI Road World Championships took place in San Sebastián, Spain, between October 7 and October 12, 1997. The event consisted of a road race and a time trial for men, women, men under 23, junior men and junior women.

In 2002 UCI sued Festina soigneur Willy Voet for defamation over claims in his book Breaking the Chain that the UCI and Hein Verbruggen had allegedly been involved in some sort of coverup of use of Lidocaine and Laurent Brochard. In 2004 the UCI won the defamation case, and in 2006 won the appeal.

== Events summary ==
Event	Gold		Silver		Bronze	
Men's events
Men's road race	Laurent Brochard; France	6h16'48"	Bo Hamburger; Denmark	s.t.	Léon van Bon; Netherlands	s.t.
Men's time trial	Laurent Jalabert; France	52'01"	Serhiy Honchar; Ukraine	52'04"	Chris Boardman; Great Britain	52'21"
Women's events
Women's road race	Alessandra Cappellotto; Italy	2h44'37"	Elisabeth Tadich; Australia	s.t.	Catherine Marsal; France	s.t.
Women's time trial	Jeannie Longo-Ciprelli; France	39'15"	Sulfija Sabirowa; Russia	39'16"	Judith Arndt; Germany	39'44"
Men's Under-23 Events
Men's under-23 road race	Kurt Asle Arvesen; Norway	3h46"	Óscar Freire; Spain	s.t.	Gerrit Glomser; Austria	s.t.
Men's under-23 time trial	Fabio Malberti; Italy	40'41"	László Bodrogi; Hungary	41'08"	David George; South Africa	41'12"
Men's Junior Events
Men's Junior Road Race	Crescenzo d'Amore; Italy	2h54'49"	Martin Bolt; Switzerland	s.t.	Margus Salumets; Estonia	s.t.
Men's Junior Time Trial	Torsten Hiekmann; Germany	35'56"	Michael Rogers; Australia	35'57"	Alexei Markov; Russia	36'11"
Women's Junior Events
Women's Junior Road Race	Mirella van Melis; Netherlands	1h50'19"	Nicole Brändli; Switzerland	s.t.	Sofie Andersson; Sweden	s.t.
Women's Junior Time Trial	Olga Zabelinskaya; Russia	19'56"	Sylvia Hubscher; Germany	20'32"	Maria Mercedes Cagigas; Spain	20'33"
