= Manolo Saiz =

Manolo Saíz

Personal information
- Full name: Manolo Saíz Balbás
- Born: 16 October 1959 (age 67) Spain

Cycling career
- Sport: Cycling
- Role: Manager

Managerial teams
- 1989-2003: ONCE
- 2004-2006: Liberty Seguros-Würth

Manuel "Manolo" Saiz Balbás (born 16 October 1959 in Torrelavega, Cantabria) is the former team manager of one of the most successful Spanish professional road bicycle racing teams, first called Team ONCE, then Liberty Seguros-Würth, Astana-Würth, and lastly Astana Team.

Saiz was a hands-on manager and directeur sportif. He consolidated his riders' training and hired staff to manage their coaching and racing. Despite not having a racing background, he nurtured ONCE to become one of the biggest teams. His riders included Frenchman Laurent Jalabert and Swiss Alex Zülle; both dominated the Vuelta a España, each winning the general and other classifications. In 1995 Jalabert achieved the trifecta by winning the general classification along with the points and King of the Mountains.

Saiz's next riders included Spaniard Abraham Olano, Igor González de Galdeano and Joseba Beloki. ONCE dominated team time trials in the Tour de France.

At the end of the 2003 ONCE discontinued sponsorship, saying penetration was 100% in Spain, meaning every Spaniard knew what ONCE was. Saiz brought Liberty Seguros (the Spanish branch of the US company Liberty Mutual) and Würth, a German assembly technology company to be co-sponsor.

== Controversy ==
=== 1998 - Festina affair ===
During the turmoil of the Festina affair during the 1998 Tour de France Saiz withdrew the ONCE-Deutsche Bank team.

On 17 June 1999 The organisers of the 1999 Tour de France took the unprecedented step of banning teams, team officials and individual riders in the aftermath of the Festina affair. This included both Saiz and Dr Nicolás Terrados team doctor of Team ONCE. The ban was in relation to the actions and behaviour of these teams and riders during the 1998 Tour when Saiz withdrew his riders and said: "[I have] stuffed a finger up the Tour's arse".

Richard Virenque's lawyers depended on a clause in the UCI's rules, number 1.2.048, which says that tour organisers must say at least 30 days before a race whom they wished to admit. The Tour had not done so. The UCI also obliged the Tour to accept Saiz.

=== 2006 - Operación Puerto ===
On 23 May 2006, Saiz was arrested in connection with the Operación Puerto scandals. He resigned and his company, Active Bay, was stripped of its ProTour license, which was awarded to the company backing Astana Team.

Saiz was cleared of damaging public health and managed a restaurant and wedding catering business in his home region of Cantabria for several years. In August 2013, he expressed an interest in returning to cycling.
