= Festina (cycling team) =

Cycling team (1989–2001)

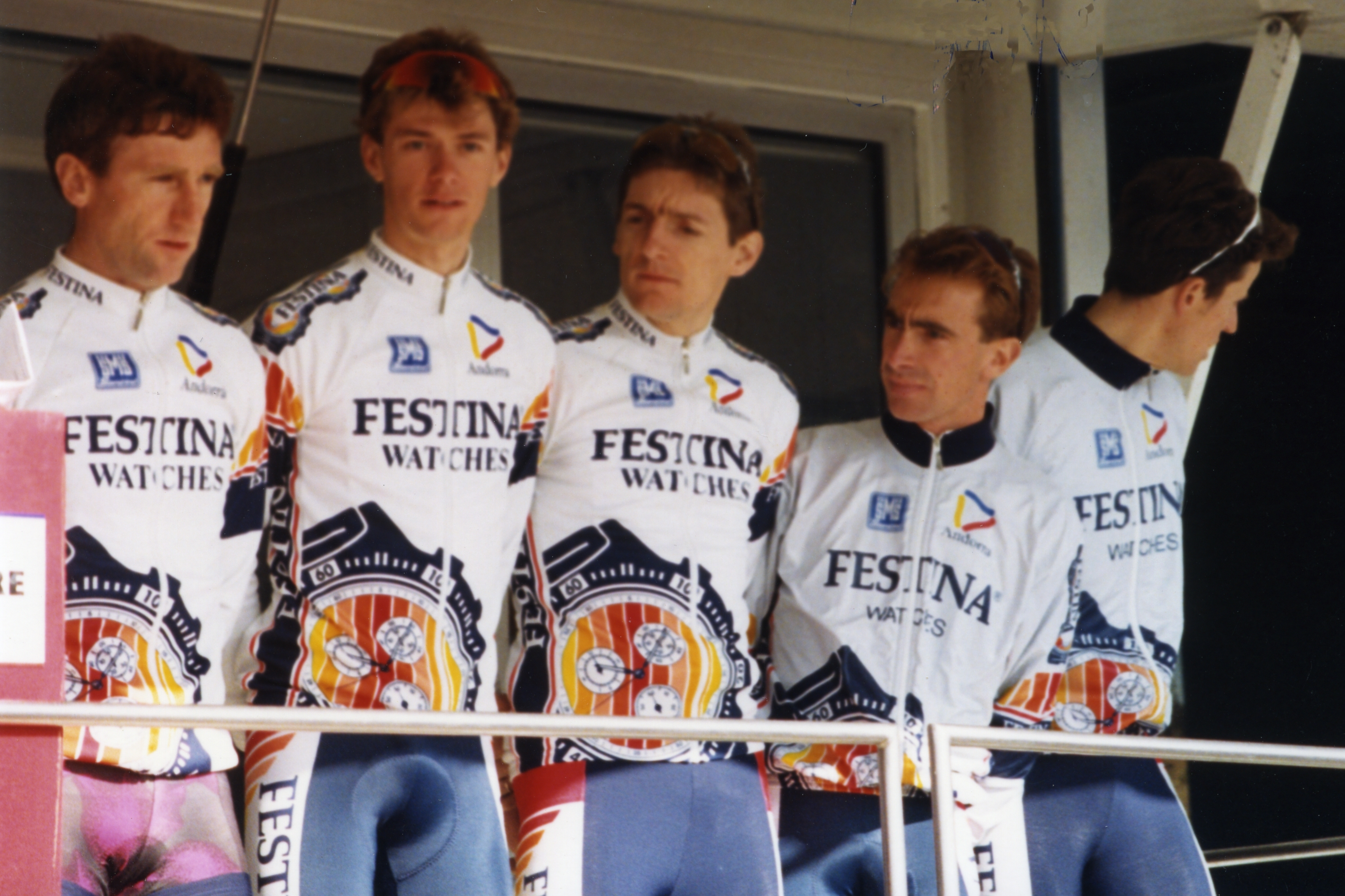
- The Festina–Lotus at the 1993 Paris–Nice

Team information
- UCI code: FES
- Registered: Spain (1989–1992); Andorra (1993–1994, 1996); France (1995, 1997–2001)
- Founded: 1989
- Disbanded: 2001
- Discipline: Road

Key personnel
- General manager: Miguel Moreno Cachinero (1989–1993); Bruno Roussel (1994–1998); Juan Fernández Martín (1999–2001)

Team name history
- 1989 1990–1992 1993–1999 2000–2001: Lotus–Zahor; Lotus–Festina; Festina–Lotus; Festina
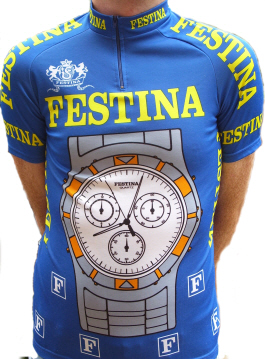
Festina jersey
Jersey

Festina was a former professional cycling team that was active in the professional peloton from 1990 to 2001. The team was sponsored by the Swiss watch manufacturer of the same name.

== History ==
=== Beginnings ===
The team first appeared as Lotus Quartz in 1987 to 1988, then Lotus-Zahor-Macario. In 1990, the team became Lotus–Festina. In 1993, the team became Festina–Lotus which it was known by until 2000. The 1993 team was supplied by Rossin Bikes.

The team was a Spanish team from 1989 to 1992. Then the team was based in Andorra in 1993 and 1994. In 1995, the team became French-based from which it would stay until the team retired from the peloton, with the sole exception of 1996.

In 1991, the team signed the Portuguese cyclist Acácio da Silva who would not win the sprints classification in that year's Vuelta a España.

The team signed Sean Kelly in 1992 who won Milan–San Remo, the first Classic victory for the team. The team entered its first Tour de France in 1992. The team manager and directeur sportifs at this time included Miguel Moreno Cachinero and Carlos Machin Rodriguez but Bruno Roussel joined the team in 1993 and would lead the team during its most successful years. Richard Virenque joined the team in 1993. The following year the team challenged Miguel Induráin in the 1994 Tour de France whereby teammates Luc Leblanc and Richard Virenque finished the race 4th and 5th overall and Festina won the team classification. Over the following years, Festina would be present in the Tour de France with Virenque finishing the race 3rd overall in 1996 and second overall in 1997.

=== Festina affair ===
Virenque was a favourite in the 1998 Tour de France but after team soigneur Willy Voet was caught by France-Belgium border officials with large quantities of doping products in his Festina team car, all members of the 1998 Tour team including the World Champion Laurent Brochard and Christophe Moreau were arrested and seven admitted to taking EPO and were ejected from the race. Team doctor Eric Rijkaert was also arrested. Rijkaert was team doctor from 1993 to 1998. Laurent Brochard, Christophe Moreau and Didier Rous confessed and were served a six-month suspension before returning to racing whereas Richard Virenque did not confess, releasing a book called Ma Vérité where he denied using doping products. However, on 24 October 2000, Virenque finally confessed and was handed a suspension. The team doctor that was at the heart of the scandal, Eric Rijkaert, released a book in 2000 about the affair and discussing doping in the sport called De Zaak Festina.

=== Post Festina affair ===
Due to these doping scandals, the team reorganised itself and sponsor Festina set up the Fondation d'Entreprise Festina which aimed to promote any actions that prevent doping taking place that are undertaken by institutions or individuals. After the Festina Affair Juan Fernández Martín, Yvon Sanquer, Michel Gros, Roberto Torres Toledano, Jacky Lachevere and Gerald Rue directed the team in its final years. The team achieved 3rd and 4th overall in the 2000 Tour de France with Joseba Beloki and Christophe Moreau and won the 2001 Vuelta a España with Ángel Casero before retiring from the sport at the end of the 2001 season. The sponsor Festina continued in professional cycling for many years more by being the official timekeeper at the Tour de France, the Giro d'Italia, the Vuelta a España and several other stage-races.

== Major wins ==
1989
Stage 6 Vuelta a España, Luc Suykerbuyk
Criterium Bavel, Luc Suykerbuyk
1990
Route Adélie de Vitré, Roberto Torres
1991
Spain National Cyclo-cross Championships
Giro del Veneto, Roberto Pagnin
Stage 2 Volta Ciclista a Catalunya, Mathieu Hermans
1992
Milan–San Remo, Sean Kelly
Trofeo Luis Puig, Sean Kelly
Stage 3 Vuelta a Aragón, Andrei Zubov
Stage 13 Vuelta a España, Roberto Torres
Stage 10 Giro d'Italia, Roberto Pagnin
Stage 7 Tour de Suisse, Sean Kelly
Stage 9 Tour de Suisse, Roberto Pagnin
Switzerland National Road Race Championships, Thomas Wegmüller
Giro del Lago Maggiore, Thomas Wegmüller
Circuito de Getxo, Mathieu Hermans
1993
Stages 4 & 8 Vuelta a España, Jean-Paul van Poppel
Stage 14, Tour de France, Pascal Lino
Stage 3 Volta Ciclista a Catalunya, Jean-Paul van Poppel
Profronde van Oostvoorne, Gert Jakobs
Stage 2 Tour du Poitou Charentes et de la Vienne, Thierry Marie
Criterium Ulvenhout, Sean Kelly
1994
Ronde van Boxmeer, Jean-Paul van Poppel
Étoile de Bessèges, Jean-Paul van Poppel
Ronde van Pijnacker, Jean-Paul van Poppel
Stage 9 Vuelta a España, Jean-Paul van Poppel
Stage 5 Critérium du Dauphiné, Pascal Hervé
Mountains classification Tour de France, Richard Virenque

Stage 2, Jean-Paul van Poppel
Stage 11, Luc Leblanc
Stage 12, Richard Virenque

World Road Race Championships, Luc Leblanc
Boucles de l'Aulne, Richard Virenque
Trophée des Grimpeurs, Richard Virenque
1995
France National Cyclo-cross Championships
La Poly Normande, Richard Virenque
Overall Vuelta a Burgos, Laurent Dufaux
Overall Route du Sud, Laurent Dufaux
Gent–Wevelgem, Lars Michaelsen
Stages 4 & 6 Critérium du Dauphiné, Richard Virenque
Stages 7 Critérium du Dauphiné, Fabian Jeker
Mountains classification Tour de France, Richard Virenque

Stage 15, Richard Virenque

1996
France National Cyclo-cross Championships, Emmanuel Magnien
Overall Vuelta Ciclista de Chile, Christophe Moreau
Finland National Road Race Championships, Joona Laukka
Escalada a Montjuïc, Fabian Jeker
La Poly Normande, Laurent Brochard
Overall Tour du Limousin, Laurent Brochard
Overall Tour du Haut Var, Bruno Boscardin
Stage 7 Paris–Nice, Bruno Boscardin
Stage 6 Giro d'Italia Pascal Hervé
Stage 4 Critérium du Dauphiné, Richard Virenque
Mountains classification Tour de France, Richard Virenque

Stages 17 & 19, Laurent Dufaux

Switzerland National Hill climb Championships, Laurent Dufaux
Giro del Piemonte, Richard Virenque
1997
Overall Vuelta Ciclista de Chile, Patrice Halgand
Étoile de Bessèges, Patrice Halgand
La Poly Normande, Richard Virenque
Prueba Villafranca de Ordizia, Laurent Lefèvre
GP d'Ouverture La Marseillaise, Richard Virenque
Stage 7 Giro d'Italia, Marcel Wüst
Mountains classification Tour de France, Richard Virenque

Stage 9, Laurent Brochard
Stage 14, Richard Virenque
Stage 17, Anthony Neil Stephens
Stage 18, Didier Rous

Coppa Bernocchi, Gianluca Bortolami
Stages 2, 3 & 5 Vuelta a España, Marcel Wüst
World Road Race Championships, Laurent Brochard
Giro del Piemonte, Gianluca Bortolami
1998
Overall Vuelta Ciclista de Chile, Marcel Wüst
Grand Prix du Midi Libre, Laurent Dufaux
Escalada a Montjuïc, Fabian Jeker
GP Chiasso, Gianluca Bortolami
Stage 5b Setmana Catalana de Ciclisme, Alex Zülle
Stage 3 Critérium International, Christophe Moreau
Stage 3 Vuelta Ciclista al Pais Vasco, Pascal Hervé
Trophée des Grimpeurs, Pascal Hervé
Overall Tour de Romandie, Laurent Dufaux

Prologue, Stages 1 & 3, Laurent Dufaux
Stage 4b, Alex Zülle

Prologue, Stages 6 & 15 Giro d'Italia, Alex Zülle
Circuito de Getxo, Marcel Wüst
Stage 6 Critérium du Dauphiné, Richard Virenque
GP Ouest France-Plouay, Pascal Hervé
Stages 14 & 17 Vuelta a España, Marcel Wüst
Stage 21 Vuelta a España, Alex Zülle
1999
A Travers le Morbihan, Patrice Halgand
Stage 1 Setmana Catalana de Ciclisme, Marcel Wüst
Grand Prix de Plumelec-Morbihan, Patrice Halgand
Stage 5 Critérium du Dauphiné, Laurent Madouas
Overall Tour du Poitou Charentes et de la Vienne, Christophe Moreau

Stage 4, Christophe Moreau

Stages 4, 5, 6 & 7 Vuelta a España, Marcel Wüst
Stage 9, Vuelta a España, Laurent Brochard
Australia National Time Trial Championships, Jonathan Hall
2000
Profronde van Surhuisterveen, Marcel Wüst
Escalada a Montjuïc, Fabian Jeker
Overall Vuelta Ciclista Asturias, Joseba Beloki
Stage 3b Tour de Romandie, Joseba Beloki
Overall Deutschland Tour, David Plaza Romero

Stage 6, Marcel Wüst
Stage 7, David Plaza Romero

Stage 3 Tour de Suisse, Wladimir Belli
Stage 5 Tour de France, Marcel Wüst
GP Città di Camaiore, Wladimir Belli
Stage 5 Tour du Poitou Charentes et de la Vienne, Stéphane Augé
2001
Overall Vuelta Ciclista de Chile, David Plaza Romero
Stage 2 Étoile de Bessèges, Steffen Radochla
Stage 5 Étoile de Bessèges, Florent Brard
Cholet-Pays de la Loire, Florent Brard
Stage 3 Tour de Romandie, David Plaza Romero
Overall Critérium du Dauphiné, Christophe Moreau
France National Time Trial Championship, Florent Brard
Prologue Tour de France, Christophe Moreau
Prueba Villafranca de Ordizia, David Clinger
Overall Vuelta a España, Ángel Casero
Paris–Bourges, Florent Brard

== Notable riders ==
- Acácio da Silva
- Sean Kelly
- Abraham Olano
- Steven Rooks
- Richard Virenque
- Jean-Paul van Poppel
- Thierry Marie
- Pascal Lino
- Luc Leblanc
- Lars Michaelsen
- Laurent Brochard
- Emmanuel Magnien
- Christophe Bassons
- Patrice Halgand
- Christophe Moreau
- Didier Rous
- Anthony Neil Stephens
- Marcel Wüst
- Joseba Beloki
- Ángel Casero
- Alex Zülle
