= 1999 Tour du Haut Var =

Race details
- Dates: 20 February 1999
- Stages: 1
- Distance: 180 km (111.8 mi)
- Winning time: 4h 39' 50"

Results
	Winner	Davide Rebellin (ITA)
	Second	Beat Zberg (SUI)
	Third	Christophe Bassons (FRA)

The 1999 Tour du Haut Var was the 31st edition of the Tour du Haut Var cycle race and was held on 20 February 1999. The race started and finished in Draguignan. The race was won by Davide Rebellin.

== General classification ==
Final general classification

Rank	Rider	Time
1	Davide Rebellin (ITA)	4h 39' 50"
2	Beat Zberg (SUI)	+ 5"
3	Christophe Bassons (FRA)	+ 5"
4	Axel Merckx (BEL)	+ 5"
5	Nicolaj Bo Larsen (DEN)	+ 1' 50"
6	Benoît Salmon (FRA)	+ 1' 52"
7	Sébastien Demarbaix (BEL)	+ 1' 56"
8	Stéphane Heulot (FRA)	+ 2' 24"
9	Gilles Bouvard (FRA)	+ 2' 25"
10	Anthony Morin (FRA)	+ 2' 35"
