= Christophe Bassons =

French cyclist (born 1974)

Personal information
- Full name: Christophe Bassons
- Born: 10 June 1974 (age 52) Mazamet, France
- Height: 1.86 m (6 ft 1 in)
- Weight: 74 kg (163 lb)

Cycling career
- Sport: Cycling
- Discipline: Road
- Role: Rider

Professional teams
- 1996: Force Sud
- 1996–1998: Festina–Lotus
- 1999: Française des Jeux
- 2000–2001: Jean Delatour

Christophe Bassons (born 10 June 1974) is a French former professional road racing cyclist. His career ended when he spoke out about doping in the Tour de France.

== Origins ==
Christophe Bassons was born in Mazamet, France, in the Tarn department. He studied and qualified in civil engineering. He began cycle-racing in 1991 in mountain biking. He started racing on the road in 1992 and won the Tour du Tarn et Garonne in 1995. That same year he won the world military time-trial championship and became national time-trial champion. He turned professional in 1996 for Force Sud and then, when the team failed, for Festina, a watch and clock maker.

== 1998 and Festina ==
Bassons became known during the 1998 Festina doping scandal, when the discovery of a carload of drugs being driven to the team's riders in the Tour de France led to evidence that doping was widespread in the team. In September 1998, the newspaper France Soir published statements made to the police. Two convicted riders, Armin Meier and Christophe Moreau, said that Bassons was the only rider on the team not taking drugs.

Jean-Luc Gatellier said in L'Équipe:

It's true he's not one of them and he hasn't come out of the same mould. It's true that he refused to 'load the cannon' (the pretty expression used by those who take EPO) these past years, it's true that Christophe Bassons doesn't belong to the family of cheats and the corrupted.

Moreau's and Meier's court statement brought attention to a rider who had never acquired it through his racing. He wrote in Vélo, a French monthly, that riders who spoke out against quarterly medical checks imposed by the sports ministry after the Festina trial were hypocrites. He said: "That makes me laugh when I hear they're asking for changes to the tests. The truth, however, is that they are obliged to change their behaviour. They talk about 'two-speed cycling' But me, for three years, I've been the second speed. They have ruined three years of my life as a racer and I never said anything."

In 1998 he turned down a 270,000 franc-per-month raise (more than 10 times what he was earning at the time) offered to him if he would use Erythropoietin (EPO). His stance against doping led other riders, most notably Lance Armstrong, to harass him for breaking the longstanding code of silence about doping in the sport.

== 1999 Tour ==
The interest that the Festina trial brought to him led to an invitation to write a column during the 1999 Tour de France for Le Parisien, a newspaper in the same corporate group as the Tour de France itself. Bassons wanted to write about the "suspicious" speeds he was seeing; the average speed at the 1999 Tour was 25.2 mph (40.6 km/h); no Tour had ever been run faster than 24.9 mph (40.1 km/h). As he later told Bicycling, "The 1999 Tour was supposed to be the "Tour of Renewal," but I was certain that doping had not disappeared." He was not the only rider concerned about how fast the 1999 Tour was going; fellow Frenchman Jean-Cyril Robin who rode for US Postal in 1997-98, told Bassons at one point, "This has got to stop! We can't go on racing like this!"

Ian Austen wrote in Procycling:

On the whole his columns were largely innocuous if entertaining looks at life in the peloton. If anything, he sometimes went out of his way to dispel doping rumours. After the stage into Blois, which passed at record average speed, Bassons warned readers: 'Don't get any ideas about the record speed. With a wind like we had, it's normal to ride this fast.' But two columns stuck out. After Lance Armstrong showed that not only had he recovered from cancer, he'd risen to the top of the pack, Bassons wrote that his performances had 'shocked' the peloton.

Stage 10 took place on 14 July and was from Sestrieres to Alpe d'Huez. Nobody had been talking to him. The entire peloton planned to ride slow for the first 100 km without telling him. Bassons only heard about this because a mechanic from his team told him. Bassons decided he was "fed up" and decided to ride ahead of the others ("attacked from the start"). As they came to a flat spot, "all of the teams rode together to close me down". As the teams rode by him, they stared at him.

" . . . and then Lance Armstrong reached me. He grabbed my by the shoulder, because he knew that everyone would be watching, and he knew that at that moment, he could show everyone that he was the boss. He stopped me, and he said what I was saying wasn't true, what I was saying was bad for cycling, that I mustn't say it, that I had no right to be a professional cyclist, that I should quit cycling, that I should quit the tour, and finished by saying [*beep*] you. . . . I was depressed for 6 months. I was crying all of the time. I was in a really bad way." - Bassons, from BBC Radio 5, 2012 10 15

Bassons said Armstrong also asked him why he was speaking out; "I told him that I'm thinking of the next generation of riders. Then he said 'Why don't you leave, then?'" Armstrong confirmed the story. On the main evening news on TF1, a French national television station, Armstrong said: "His accusations aren't good for cycling, for his team, for me, for anybody. If he thinks cycling works like that, he's wrong and he would be better off going home."

Bassons was shunned by other riders. Giving a television interview at St-Étienne (after Stage 11), he said, a passing rider in his own team said: "Watch what you say!" Bassons said: "I started feeling isolated. In the middle of 170 riders, that's a tough way to live." Race director Jean-Marie Leblanc chastised Bassons for speaking as if "he is the only rider who is beyond reproach." Officials with his own team joined in on the condemnation, calling him a coward who only spoke to burnish his own image. Riders shunned him or at best nodded. He cracked, saying he had not wanted to leave the race but his nerves could not stand it anymore. He said:

The [team doctor] comforted me. We often talk together about the problem of doping and we share the same ideas. I confided in him and I whined [j'ai chialé]. I got to sleep but a bit after midnight I could no longer sleep because of my worries. I went into the corridor, I phoned my coach, Antoine Vayer, and Pascale, my wife. At 5.30am I had my breakfast and I packed my case. I crossed with Marc and he said I was letting down the team. He said a rider could leave the race if he cracked physically but he couldn't accept that one can crack mentally. I said goodbye to everyone but one rider didn't look at me and refused to shake my hand. That hurt.

The reporter Jean-Michel Rouet wrote:

Sometimes he was congratulated on his courage, as Daniel Baal, the president of the FFC at the start at Sestrieres. But more often, others pointed at him [on le montrait du doigt], looked elsewhere, if they didn't just insult him. He has a few friends and a heap of enemies. His solitude was the living proof that nothing fundamental has changed in the morals of the milieu. Christophe Bassons died at the stake [est mort au bucher], burned by his passion. On official communiqués, he left two words: non partant. The peloton had already forgotten rider number 152.

The sports minister, Marie-George Buffet, said: "What a strange role reversal. Rather than fighting against doping, they're fighting its opponent." She wrote to him to sympathise, saying that it was time someone spoke out.

Bassons' colleagues in the Française des Jeux team refused to share their prizes with him. Normally teams pool their winnings and share them out by the number of days a rider has survived the race. One rider, Xavier Jan, said: "Christophe Bassons rode only for himself and didn't at any time work for the overall good of the team." It had nothing to do with his comments about doping, he said. Thierry Bourguignon, part of another team but earlier a member with Bassons of Force Sud, confirmed: "I was the only one to talk to Bassons... He doesn't listen to anyone. Bassons is an individualist. Even in a race he doesn't easily lend a hand. He rides for himself."

== Cycling after 1999 ==
Bassons raced again, riding in Germany and Belgium. He said: "I felt a lot of tension. Some didn't talk to me. Others pretended nothing had happened, which is worse. Some say it's just youthful folly, but I feel more adult than them. I'm not the only clean rider but there aren't many who can say 'I don't take drugs'. For most riders, their health is the last of their concerns."

He moved to a smaller team, Jean Delatour, but the mistreatment continued. In 2001 at Four Days of Dunkirk, he later told Bicycling, "several guys tried to ride me into the ditch . . . it got dangerous, and I realized that it wasn't worth continuing". He ended his professional road racing career. In her book about the Armstrong doping scandal, Cycle of Lies, Juliet Macur wrote that Bassons' mistreatment was a sign of the power Armstrong had over international cycling at the time.

On 20 October 2012, he was suspended for one year by the French Cycling Federation (FFC) for having missed an antidoping test during the 2012 French national mountain bike championships. He had quit the race partway through, and by the time he heard he was one of the riders chosen for testing, it was too late to get back to the race site for the test. His suspension was reduced to one month on appeal. Bassons took the FFC to court and they found in his favour ruling that the governing body owed him compensation. The FFC appealed but the court did not find in their favour and they had to pay Bassons €31,691 (£28,440/$36,270) in compensation.

In 2011/2012, after investigations into past doping in cycling, especially the 2012 USADA report on Armstrong's US Postal Service team, some media re-told Bassons' story. In one interview for the BBC, Tyler Hamilton publicly apologized for being part of the peloton that shunned him, saying that he (Tyler) was "100% wrong" not to talk to Bassons. Bassons said "that's life, it's nothing. I don't begrudge Hamilton. I understand."

== After professional cycling ==
In 2000 he published his autobiography Positif and in 2001 he qualified as a sports teacher and began teaching. He now works for the ministry of youth and sport at Bordeaux, in charge of drug tests.

He told Willisher of Guardian in 2012 that he considered his career to be as a sports professor, not his six years of cycling. He also said that he was "not bitter" against Armstrong, and was content with his situation, comparing it to what Armstrong was going through in the wake of the 2012 USADA report.

== Major results ==
1996
7th Grand Prix des Nations
1998
3rd Time trial, National Road Championships
4th Overall Tour de Pologne
5th GP Eddy Merckx
10th Grand Prix d'Ouverture La Marseillaise
1999
1st Stage 7 Critérium du Dauphiné Libéré
3rd Tour du Haut Var
2000
3rd Grand Prix d'Ouverture La Marseillaise
2001
9th Overall Circuit des Mines
