= Union Cycliste Internationale =

International governing body of cycling

- Abbreviation: UCI
- Formation: 14 April 1900; 126 years ago
- Founded at: Paris, France
- Type: Sports federation
- Headquarters: Aigle, Switzerland
- Region served: Worldwide
- President: David Lappartient
- Main organ: Congress
- Affiliations: International Olympic Committee
- Website: https://www.uci.org/

The Union Cycliste Internationale (French pronunciation: [ynjɔ̃ siklist ɛ̃tɛʁnɑsjɔnal]; UCI; English: International Cycling Union) is the world governing body for sports cycling and oversees international competitive cycling events. The UCI is based in Aigle, Switzerland.

The UCI issues racing licenses to riders and enforces disciplinary rules, such as in matters of doping. The UCI also manages the classification of races and the points ranking system in various cycling disciplines including road and track cycling, mountain biking, cyclo-cross, gravel, and BMX, for both men and women, amateur and professional. It also oversees the World Championships.

== History ==
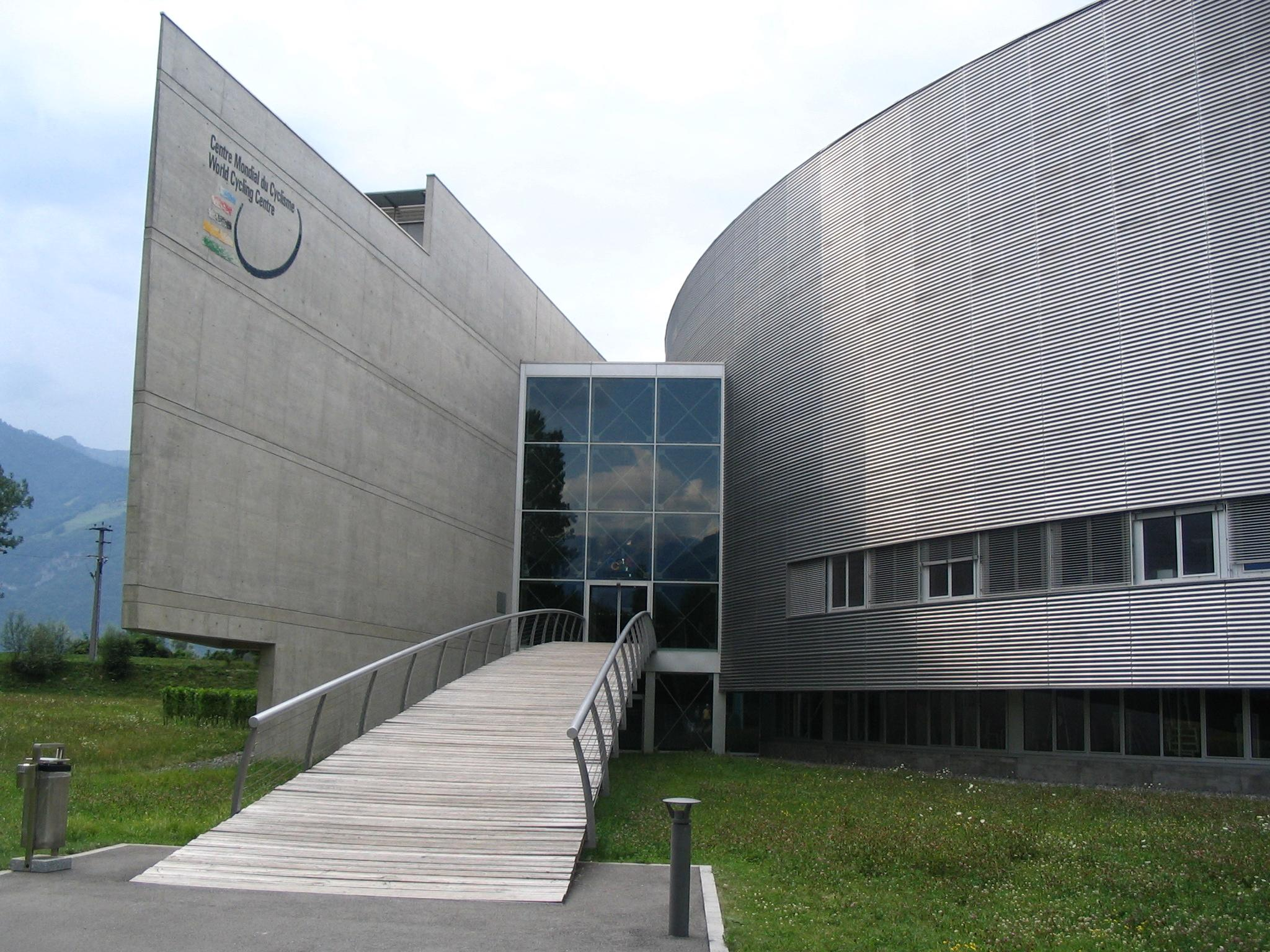
The headquarters of the Union Cycliste Internationale in Aigle, Switzerland

The UCI was founded on 14 April 1900 in Paris by the national cycling sports organisations of Belgium, the United States, France, Italy, and Switzerland. It replaced the International Cycling Association (ICA) by setting up in opposition in a row over whether Great Britain should be allowed just one team at the world Championships or separate teams representing England, Ireland, Scotland and Wales. Britain found itself outflanked, and it was not able to join the UCI – under the conditions the UCI had imposed – until 1903.

There were originally 30 countries affiliated to the union. They did not have equal voting power and some had no vote at all. Votes were distributed by the number of tracks, or velodromes, that each nation claimed. France had 18 votes, the highest number, and Germany and Italy 14 each. Britain had eight, a number the writer Bill Mills said was acquired "by including many rather doubtful grass tracks."

In 1965, under the pressure of the IOC, when the Olympics was an amateur event, the UCI created two subsidiary bodies, the International Amateur Cycling Federation (Fédération Internationale Amateur de Cyclisme or FIAC) and the International Professional Cycling Federation (Fédération Internationale de Cyclisme Professionnel or FICP). The UCI assumed a role coordinating both bodies.

The FIAC was based in Rome, the FICP in Luxembourg, and the UCI in Geneva.

The FIAC was the bigger of the two organisations, with 127 member federations across all five continents. It was dominated by the countries of the Eastern Bloc which were amateur. The FIAC arranged representation of cycling at the Olympic Games, and FIAC cyclists competed against FICP members on only rare occasions. In 1992, the UCI reunified the FIAC and FICP, and merged them back into the UCI. The combined organisation then relocated to Aigle, close to the IOC in Lausanne.

In 2004, the UCI constructed a 200-metre velodrome at the new World Cycling Centre adjacent to its headquarters.

In September 2007 the UCI announced that it had decided to award ProTour status for the first time ever to an event outside of Europe; the Tour Down Under in Adelaide, Australia. The announcement followed negotiations between UCI President Pat McQuaid and South Australian Premier Mike Rann.

In 2013, Tracey Gaudry became the first woman appointed as vice president of the UCI.

After the 2022 Russian invasion of Ukraine, the UCI said that Russian and Belarusian teams are forbidden from competing in international events. It also stripped both Russia and Belarus of scheduled events. On 3 May 2023, the UCI approved a process to review and allow Russian and Belarusian riders to participate in UCI events as individual neutral athletes. In 2026, all restrictions on Belarusian teams and athletes were lifted, as were those for junior Russians.

== World championships ==
The UCI organises cycling's world championships, administration of which it gives to member nations. The first championships were on the road and on the track. They were allocated originally to member nations in turn, on condition the country was deemed competent and that it could guarantee ticket sales. A nation given a championship or series of championships was required to pay the UCI 30 per cent of ticket receipts from the track and 10 per cent from the road. Of this, the UCI kept 30 per cent and gave the rest to competing nations in proportion to the number of events in which it competed. The highest gate money in this pre-war era was 600 000 francs in Paris in 1903.

There were originally five championships: amateur and professional sprint, amateur and professional road race, and professional Motor-paced racing. The road race was traditionally a massed start but did not have to be: Britain organised its road championship before the war as a time trial, the National Cyclists Union believing it best to run races against the clock, and without publicity before the start, to avoid police attention. Continental European organisers generally preferred massed races on circuits, fenced throughout or along the finish to charge for entry.

=== Records ===
The original records were on the track: unpaced, human-paced and mechanically paced. They were promoted for three classes of bicycle: solos, tandems and unusual machines such as what are now known as recumbents, on which the rider lies horizontal. Distances were imperial and metric, from 440 yards and 500 metres to 24 hours. The UCI banned recumbents in competitions and in record attempts on 1 April 1934. Later changes included restrictions on riding positions of the sort that affected Graeme Obree in the 1990s and the banning in 2000 of all frames that did not have a seat tube.

=== Rainbow jersey ===
The winner of a UCI World Championship title is awarded a rainbow jersey, white with five coloured bands on the chest. This jersey can be worn in only the discipline, specialty and category of competition in which it was awarded, and expires on the day before the following world championship event. Former champions are permitted to wear rainbow piping on the cuffs and collar of their clothing.

== Controversies ==
=== Helmet use in road racing ===
For decades, professional road cyclists refused to wear helmets. The first serious attempt by the UCI to introduce compulsory helmet use was the 1991 Paris–Nice race, which resulted in a riders' strike, and the UCI abandoned the idea.

After the death of Andrei Kivilev in the 2003 Paris–Nice, new rules were introduced on 5 May 2003, with the 2003 Giro d'Italia being the first major race affected. The 2003 rules allowed for discarding the helmets during final climbs of at least 5 kilometres in length; subsequent revisions made helmet use mandatory at all times.

=== Bribery and doping ===
The UCI was accused of accepting a bribe in the 1990s to introduce the keirin, a track cycling race, into the Olympics. An investigation by the BBC claims that the UCI was paid approximately $3,000,000 by Japanese sources to add the race to the Olympic programme, something denied by the UCI.

When Floyd Landis confessed to using performance-enhancing drugs throughout his career in May 2010, he alleged that the UCI had accepted a bribe from Lance Armstrong to cover up an EPO positive after the 2001 Tour de Suisse.

Discussing doping in 2012, UCI president Pat McQuaid emphasised the fact that his organisation was "the first entity to introduce blood tests, the first sport to introduce the test for EPO".

=== Doping and defamation lawsuits ===
The UCI has sued or threatened to sue several cyclists, journalists, and writers for defamation after they accused it of corruption or other misdeeds related to doping. Many, though not all, of these suits are heard in the Est Vaudois district court of Vevey, Switzerland

In 2002, the UCI sued Festina soigneur Willy Voet over claims in his book Breaking the Chain. In 2004 the UCI won the case, and in 2006 won the appeal. Voet had made various claims about the UCI and Verbruggen's behavior related to the Laurent Brochard Lidocaine case at the 1997 UCI Road World Championships.

In 2006, according to Cycling News, the UCI contacted Greg LeMond after an interview he did in 2006 with L'Equipe, and threatened to sue him for defamation. LeMond mentioned the UCI-commissioned Vrijman report, as well as Operacion Puerto, and called the body "corrupt".

Another lawsuit was by Hein Verbruggen against WADA Chief Dick Pound in Swiss court regarding his comments about doping and the UCI. The lawsuit was settled by the parties in 2009.

In 2011, the UCI sued Floyd Landis in Switzerland after Landis accused the body of several misdeeds, including the aforementioned alleged coverup involving Lance Armstrong and the 2001 Tour de Suisse. In 2012 Cycling News reported that a District Court had ruled for the UCI against Landis.

In 2012 UCI president Pat McQuaid and former president Hein Verbruggen, as well as the UCI itself, sued journalist Paul Kimmage in Switzerland for defamation. In 2013, the President of Cycling Federation of Russia called the UCI Ethics Committee to investigate Pat McQuaid actions after the UCI Licence Commission denied team Katusha a place in the 2013 WorldTour – the action which was promptly reversed. Kimmage had been a racer and had a long history of investigating doping in the sport, including a book and, more recent to the suit, articles for the Sunday Times and L'Equipe which discussed doping and the UCI. Greg LeMond, David Walsh and others voiced their support for Kimmage and a legal defense fund was set up to assist him.

=== Sufferance of an international law violation ===
Under approval of the UCI, the Free Rate Downhill Race took place in May 2015 on Crimea, an internationally recognised Ukrainian territory that was annexed by the Russian Federation in March 2014. By officially overseeing an international competition with Russian license on the Ukrainian peninsula, the UCI was the first and only international sports governing body which undermined the territorial integrity of Ukraine. Yet, in the aftermath of this "scandal of sports and international law" the UCI negotiated with the Cycling Federation of Ukraine and, in November 2015, announced to remove the Free Rate Downhill Race officially from the UCI international calendar.

=== Turkmenistan ===
Turkmenistan's authoritarian leader Gurbanguly Berdimuhamedow was awarded the highest award of the Union Cycliste Internationale for his country's commitment to the sport.

== Disciplines ==
=== Road racing ===
==== Men ====
The UCI organizes the Road World Championships (road race first held in 1921, time trial first held in 1994), as well as administers the premier tier UCI World Tour and second tier UCI ProSeries races. The highest level teams in men's road cycling are the UCI WorldTeam, who are obliged to take part in all UCI World Tour races.

On top of having organized the Road World Championships since 1921, from 1989 until 2004, the UCI administered the UCI Road World Cup, a season-long competition incorporating all the major one-day professional road races. In 2005 this was replaced by the UCI ProTour series which initially included the Grand Tour road cycling stage races (the Tour de France, Giro d'Italia and Vuelta a España) and a wider range of other one-day and stage races. However, the three Grand Tour races withdrew from the series, and in July 2008 all the major professional teams threatened to quit the series, putting its future in doubt. The ProTour was replaced as a ranking system the following year by the UCI World Ranking, which added the three Grand Tours, two early season stage races, and five more one-day classics to the 14 remaining ProTour events. The World Ranking and ProTour merged in 2011, becoming the UCI World Tour.

To expand the participation and popularity of professional road bicycle racing throughout the globe, the UCI develop a series of races collectively known as the UCI Continental Circuits for each region of the world.

==== Women ====
The UCI organizes the Road World Championships (road race first held in 1959, time trial first held in 1994), as well as administers the premier tier UCI Women's World Tour races. The highest level teams in women's road cycling are the UCI Women's WorldTeams, who are invited to all UCI World Tour races.

Between 1998 and 2015, the UCI Women's Road World Cup served as a season-long competition of elite-level one-day events. From 2016, the competition was replaced by the UCI Women's World Tour - which includes stage stages as well as one-day events, including many races used in the World Cup.

=== Track cycling ===
The UCI Track Cycling World Championships for men and women offers individual and team championships in several track cycling disciplines. The UCI Track Cycling World Cup serves as a season-long competition of elite-level.

==== Para-cycling Track ====
The UCI Para-cycling Track World Championships for men and women offers individual and team championships in several track cycling disciplines.

=== Cyclo-cross ===
The UCI organizes the UCI Cyclo-cross World Cup which is a season long competition consisting of a series of one-day races in different countries. In addition, each year UCI holds the UCI Cyclo-cross World Championships to determine the world champions for various age categories. UCI also publishes the UCI cyclo-cross ranking for riders.

=== Mountain bike racing ===
In mountain bike racing, the UCI Mountain Bike & Trials World Championships is the most important and prestigious competition each year. This includes the disciplines of cross-country and downhill. In addition, this event consists of world championship events for bike trials riding. In 2012 the first cross-country eliminator world championship was held in Saalfelden.

The UCI Mountain Bike World Cup is a series of races, held annually since 1991.

At the 2011 World Championships held in Champéry, Switzerland the UCI announced a controversial new sponsorship deal with the previously unheard of RockyRoads Network.

Since 2024, the UCI has organized UCI Snow Bike World Championships for the discipline of snow biking which is a type of mountain bike racing on an alpine skiing course.

=== BMX racing ===
The season-long competition is known as the UCI BMX Racing World Cup and the UCI BMX World Championships serves as the world championships for BMX racing (bicycle motocross) cycling.

=== Trials ===
Unlike other types of cycling disciplines, trials is a sport where the main factors are the stability and the control of the bike in extreme situations where speed also plays an important role.

The first UCI Trials World Championships took place in 1986. Fourteen years later, in 2000, the UCI Trials World Cup made its debut. The most World Champions titles have been won by riders from Belgium, France, Germany, Spain and Switzerland. The UCI Trials World Youth Games is the most important international event for boys and girls under 16 years old, the first edition of which took place in 2000.

=== Indoor cycling ===
The UCI sponsors world championships for artistic cycling and cycle ball at an annual event known as the UCI Indoor Cycling World Championships.

=== Gravel ===
Since 2022, the UCI started sponsoring Gravel cycling events, holding the first UCI Gravel World Championships.

=== Bike polo ===
It was announced that in the UCI Cycling World Championships 2027 event lineup, the Grass Bike Polo World Championship will be included. Grass Bike Polo, which was an exhibition sport at the 1908 London Olympic Games, is not to be confused with Hardcourt Bike Polo, which holds independent global competitions.

== Membership ==
=== Continental confederations ===
The national federations form confederations by continent:

- Asian Cycling Confederation – ACC
- Union Européenne de Cyclisme – UEC (European Cycling Union)
- Oceania Cycling Confederation – OCC
- Confederación Panamericana de Ciclismo – COPACI (Pan American Cycling Confederation)
- Confédération Africaine de Cyclisme – CAC (African Cycling Confederation)

== See also ==
- The Cyclists' Alliance
