= Nicolás Terrados =

Spanish physician in sports medicine

Nicolás Terrados Cepeda (born 12 March 1958) is a Spanish physician specialising in sports medicine.

== Early life and education ==
Terrados was born in Espelúy and was educated at the University of Oviedo, where he earned his MD cum laude in 1991 with a thesis entitled Ejercicio Físico en Altitud: Efectos sobre el Metabolismo Muscular (Physical exercise at altitude: effects on muscular metabolism).

== Career ==
In 1988, after requesting a leave of absence from his job at the Municipal Sports Foundation of Avilés, he joined the Spanish Olympic Sports Association as a doctor. He worked as part of the monitoring program for several Olympic teams until the 1992 Olympic Games in Barcelona. During the same period, he was also part of the medical team of the Spanish Olympic Committee.

From 1998 until 2002, he served as chief of medical services for the ONCE cycling team. During the 1998 Tour de France, he was arrested by French police in connection with the Festina Affair and accused of having brought controlled substances into France. Alex Zülle had told police that he had been administered erythropoietin (EPO) by Terrados. Terrados was found guilty and given a fine of €4,573. He appealed the decision, and in 2002 was acquitted of all charges.

On 24 July 2013, the Senate of France published a report which included the results of analyses carried out in 2004 of samples collected during the 1998 Tour. The analyses used techniques which had not been available at the time of the Tour. The samples of Laurent Jalabert, a member of the ONCE team, tested positive for EPO. Jalabert admitted doping, but said that he had done so under instruction from the ONCE medical team, of which Terrados was the director.

In 2004, Terrados became director of the Unit of High Performance Sports Medicine in Avilés. During the 2011/2012 La Liga season, he also worked with the medical team of Sevilla FC, at the request of their manager Marcelino García Toral.

In 2015, he helps Pau Gasol to prepare for the European Championship of basketball.
