= Willy Voet =

Belgian sports physiotherapist

Willy Voet (born 4 July 1945) is a Belgian sports physiotherapist. He is most widely known for his involvement in the Festina affair in the 1998 Tour de France (often dubbed the "Tour of Shame").

== Biography ==
Voet was born into a working-class family, with a father who worked as a train driver and who had been a semi-professional footballer and a mother who was an upholsterer. Voet started racing bicycles at the age of 15 and enjoyed some success as a junior, winning around 20 races in total, and scoring a win against Herman Van Springel. Voet's first encounter with drugs was at the age of 18 when a friend and club team-mate persuaded him to take amphetamines for a race. He continued racing as an amateur until the age of 23, and returned to cycling as a soigneur six years later. After initially freelancing, he obtained his first contract as a soigneur with the Flandria team. Through his work as a soigneur Voet came to learn about the range of drugs used by riders and the techniques used to evade drug testing. Voet worked for a number of other teams, including Marc Zeep Centrale, Daf-Trucks and RMO, before joining Festina in 1993.

"It's a dream for a cyclist to be able to ride up a hill in a high gear, to breath comfortably and have no pain in his legs. That's what they're addicted to - to make cycling easy."

—Willy Voet, Breaking the Chain: DRUGS AND CYCLING - THE TRUE STORY.

On 8 July 1998, Voet was stopped by French Customs agents on the Chemin du Dronckaert as he tried to cross the French-Belgian border close to Neuville-en-Ferrain, near Lille in northern France. In his Festina team car, the agents found large quantities of syringes and controlled substances including narcotics, erythropoietin (EPO), growth hormones, testosterone and amphetamines. He was arrested and the Festina cycling team was suspended from the race. Further investigation led to the suspension, arrest and prosecution of numerous Festina and TVM team riders and staff. In 2000, Voet went on trial. He was convicted, given a 10-month suspended sentence and (the equivalent of) a US$4,200 fine.

Voet's book Prikken en slikken (translated as "Breaking The Chain") was released in 1999. In it, he claims to have revealed all that he knew regarding doping practices in the cycling world. The book also includes photographs of the written doping records he used to keep track of the different performance-enhancing drugs and dosages he had given to each of the team's cyclists. Those records were used in court as evidence during the trials of the Festina affair. Voet says he worked with the Festina team doctor, Eric Rijkaert, whose opinion was that drug-taking could not be eliminated from cycling and that it would be better therefore to see that doping happened with medical supervision. Rykaert died soon after the Festina trial and Voet left the sport to become a bus driver. He has been declared persona non grata by the Tour de France management and been asked to stay away from the race even as a private individual. He does maintain contact with cycling, however, and sometimes appears at seminars aimed at a greater understanding and greater restriction of drug-taking in cycling.

In 2002 Union Cycliste Internationale (then led by Hein Verbruggen) sued Voet over specific claims in his book. In 2004 the UCI won the case, and in 2006 won the appeal. Voet had made various claims about UCI and Verbruggen's behavior related to the Laurent Brochard Lidocaine case at the 1997 UCI Road World Championships.

== See also ==
- Doping at the Tour de France
- List of doping cases in cycling
