= Eric Rijkaert =

- Born: 1943; Oostwinkel, Belgium
- Died: January 27, 2001 (aged 57–58)
- Other names: Eric Rijckaert
- Occupations: Sports physician and team doctor of the Festina cycling team
- Years active: 1986 – 1998
- Known for: Festina affair during the 1998 Tour de France

Eric Rijkaert also written Eric Rijckaert (1943 – 27 January 2001) was born in Oostwinkel, Belgium. He was a former Belgian sports physician and worked with the Festina cycling team. He was said to be at the heart of the Festina affair of 1998 that led to the withdrawal of the entire Festina team during the 1998 Tour de France. Rijkaert was the team doctor from 1993 until the Festina affair in 1998.

== Career ==
Rijkaert was active in cycling when EPO was being introduced to the professional peloton by doctors such as Francesco Conconi and his former assistant Michele Ferrari. Rijkaert was firstly the team doctor of the PDM team from 1986 to 1992. After that he joined the Festina team where he stayed as doctor until the Festina Affair of the 1998 Tour de France. Rijkaert was said to have proposed the use of EPO to some of the riders. Rijkaert was known amongst the riders as "Dr Fiat Punto" after the "Punto" (a small model of Fiat automobile). This name came about in comparison to the famous Italian physician Michele Ferrari. This was because of his carefulness compared to the high performances yielded by Ferrari. Rijkaert would not let the riders blood haematocrit level go above 53-54%. Rijkaert was under pressure from team management to go higher and further with doping of the riders.

Rijkaert together with Bruno Roussel were arrested during the 1998 Tour de France in the town of Cholet. Rijkaert spent 100 days in jail while suffering from lung cancer which he stated in a book he released in Dutch called The Festina Affair or De Zaak Festina. This ordeal during the diagnosis of his lung cancer was said to have deeply affected Rijkaert mentally and physically. His book attempted to open a discussion about doping in cycling. In October 2000, Rijkaert was fined approximately 15,000 euros for breaking the law against doping. Rijkaert died from lung cancer in January 2001.
