= Team physician =

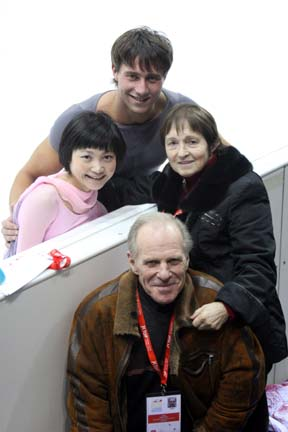
Russian team physician Victor Anikanov with Russian pairs figure skating coach Tamara Moskvina, and pairs skaters Alexander Smirnov and Yuko Kavaguti at the 2007–2008 Grand Prix of Figure Skating Final in Turin, Italy.

The team physician for a sports team is the physician who is in charge of coordinating the medical staff and medical services for a sports team. They are also subject to activities involving team building. The goal of a team physician is to improve performance and overall health. The physician is trained in Orthopedic surgery, Internal Medicine, Family Medicine, or Emergency Medicine. They also focuses on injury prevention with nutrition and activity to improve support in athletic activities. Requirements to become a team physician include four years of undergraduate study, four years of medical school, four to five years of medical residency, and one year of fellowship training.

== Football ==
The NFL Physicians Society (NFLPS) was founded in 1966; the organization provides medical and surgical care for athletes in the National Football League. In addition, team physicians provide the direction for the athletic directors to keep the athletes healthy and injury-free. There are over 150 members in the NFLPS that represent the 32 teams in the league. In order to successfully care for the athletes, the NFLPS works closely with the Professional Football Athletic Trainers Society (PFATS), the National Football League (NFL), and the National Athletic Trainers Association (NATA). Most NFL Team Physicians have previous work as a team physician on a high school or college team level.

== See also ==
- Sports medicine
