= Laurent Brochard =

French cyclist (born 1968)

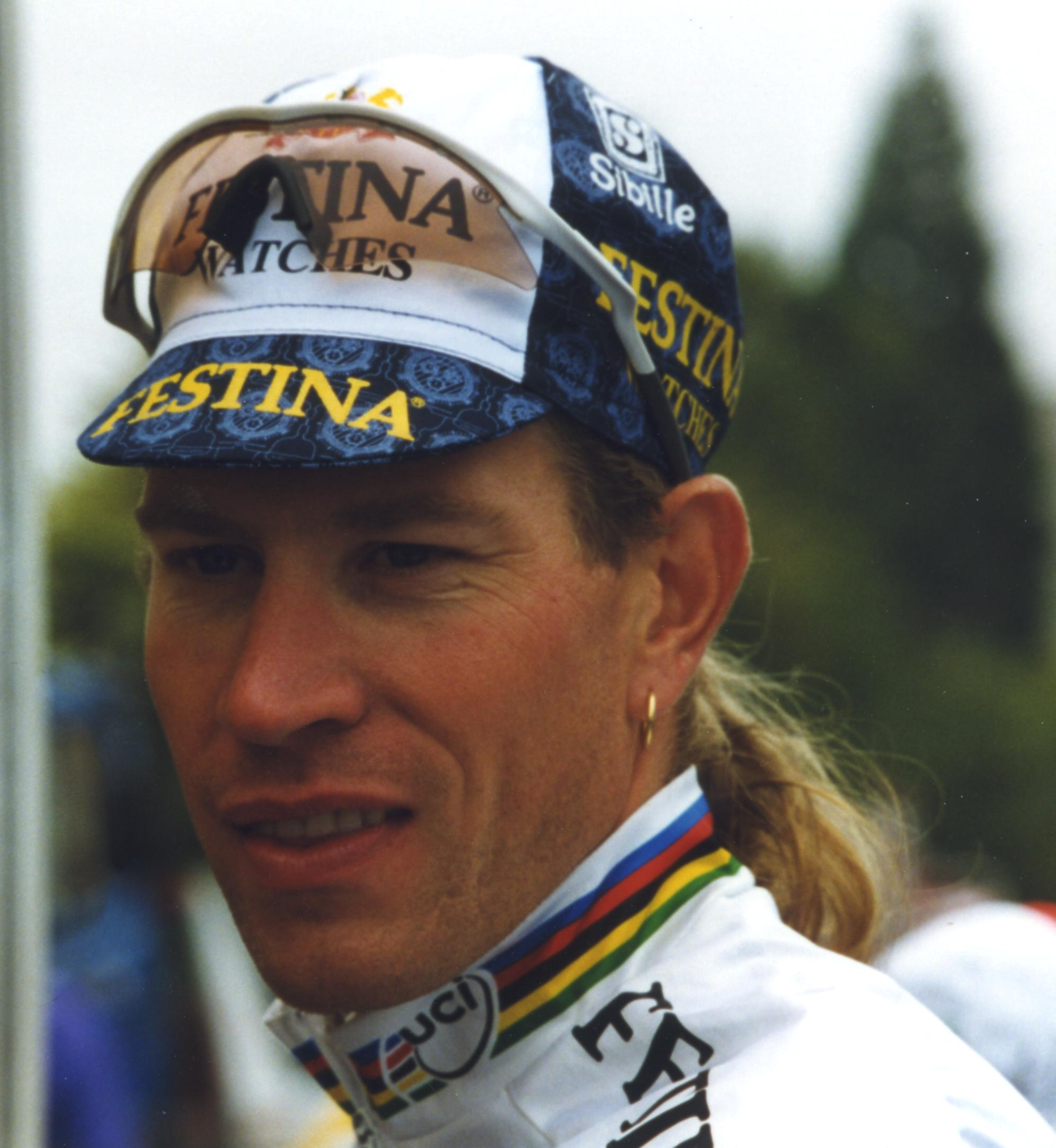
- Brochard at the 1998 Paris–Tours

Personal information
- Full name: Laurent Brochard
- Nickname: la Brochette
- Born: 26 March 1968 (age 58) Le Mans, France
- Height: 1.80 m (5 ft 11 in)
- Weight: 68 kg (150 lb; 10 st 10 lb)

Cycling career
- Sport: Cycling
- Discipline: Road
- Role: Rider

Professional teams
- 1992–1994: Castorama
- 1995–1999: Festina–Lotus
- 2000–2002: Jean Delatour
- 2003–2004: AG2R Prévoyance
- 2005–2008: Bouygues Télécom

Major wins
- Tour de France, 1 stage (1997); Vuelta a España, 1 stage Paris–Camembert (2001, 2003, 2005); Critérium International (2003); Tour de Pologne (2002); Regio-Tour (2002); Étoile de Bessèges (2004)
Medal record
Representing France
Men's road bicycle racing
World Championships
Gold medal – first place	1997 San Sebastián	Road race

Laurent Brochard (French pronunciation: [lɔʁɑ̃ bʁɔʃaʁ]; born 26 March 1968) is a retired professional road racing cyclist from France. In 1997 he won a stage of the Tour de France and became world road champion in San Sebastián, Spain.

Brochard was a runner and started cycling competitively at 19. He started with Castorama and became part of Festina cycling team. His role in Festina was super-domestique, supporting stars such as Richard Virenque but able to ride competitively when given the chance. He was implicated in the Festina scandal in the 1998 Tour de France.

After serving his suspension, Brochard joined Ag2r Prévoyance as leader and had successes in races such as Critérium International and Étoile de Béssèges. He then moved to Bouygues Télécom.

He is a fan of Belgian comic character Marsupilami, often wearing Marsupilami logo and clothing at races.

== Major results ==
1989
1st Stage 4 Tour Poitou-Charentes en Nouvelle-Aquitaine
1990
10th Overall Tour de la Communauté Européenne
1991
10th Overall Circuit Franco-Belge
1992
1st Stage 3 Tour Méditerranéen
6th Overall Tour de l'Avenir
7th Overall Tirreno–Adriatico
7th Kuurne–Brussels–Kuurne
7th Paris–Tours
9th Trophée des Grimpeurs
1993
1st Stage 2 Tour Méditerranéen
2nd Road race, National Road Championships
2nd Overall Route du Sud
4th Paris–Camembert
6th Overall Paris–Nice
9th Overall Tour du Limousin
9th Omloop Het Volk
1994
1st Overall Regio-Tour

1st Stage 5

1st Tour du Haut-Var
2nd Overall Circuit de la Sarthe

1st Stage 3

3rd Overall Tour Méditerranéen
3rd Paris–Camembert
7th GP Ouest–France
8th Grand Prix de Rennes
1995
Tour de l'Ain

1st Stages 2, 3 & 4

2nd Paris–Camembert
6th Overall Four Days of Dunkirk
9th Overall Tour Méditerranéen
1996
1st Overall Tour du Limousin

1st Stages 1 & 2

1st La Polynormande
2nd Road race, National Road Championships
2nd Overall Grand Prix du Midi Libre
2nd GP Ouest–France
2nd Chrono des Herbiers
5th Overall Paris–Nice
5th Trophée des Grimpeurs
7th Overall Three Days of De Panne
7th Overall Critérium du Dauphiné Libéré
7th Tour of Flanders
8th La Flèche Wallonne
9th Milan–San Remo
1997
1st Road race, UCI Road World Championships
1st Stage 9 Tour de France
Grand Prix du Midi Libre

1st Stages 3, 5 & 6

4th Road race, National Road Championships
1998
2nd Paris–Bourges
3rd Overall Grand Prix du Midi Libre

1st Stage 6

3rd La Polynormande
6th Tour de Vendée
1999
1st Stage 9 Vuelta a España
2nd Bordeaux–Caudéran
4th Time Trial, National Road Championships
8th Züri–Metzgete
8th Overall Vuelta a Asturias
2000
1st Paris–Bourges
1st Route Adelié
2nd Overall Paris–Nice

1st Prologue

2nd Classic Haribo
3rd Overall Circuit de la Sarthe
4th Gran Premio Città di Camaiore
7th Overall Critérium International

1st Stage 3 (ITT)

7th Overall Tour of Sweden
9th Cholet-Pays de Loire
9th EnBW Grand Prix
9th Boucles de l'Aulne
2001
1st Paris–Camembert
1st Grand Prix de Villers-Cotterêts
2nd Cholet-Pays de Loire
2nd Trophée des Grimpeurs
3rd Overall Tour Méditerranéen
3rd Route Adélie
4th Gran Premio di Lugano
4th Paris–Bourges
5th Overall Circuit de la Sarthe

1st Stage 1

7th Gran Premio di Chiasso
8th Overall Étoile de Bessèges
9th Boucles de l'Aulne
10th Grand Prix de Denain
2002
1st Overall Tour de Pologne

1st Stage 7

1st Overall Regio-Tour

1st Stage 4

1st Stage 4 Grand Prix du Midi Libre
2nd La Polynormande
3rd Overall Four Days of Dunkirk
3rd Route Adélie
4th Overall Circuit de la Sarthe
5th Overall Critérium International
7th Cholet-Pays de Loire
7th Paris–Bourges
10th Classic Haribo
2003
1st Overall Critérium International

1st Points classification
1st Stage 2

1st Paris–Camembert
1st Points classification Paris–Nice
1st Stage 5 Vuelta a Castilla y León
2nd Overall Tour Méditerranéen
3rd Overall Circuit de la Sarthe
3rd Overall Four Days of Dunkirk
3rd Route Adélie
3rd Overall Danmark Rundt
4th Overall Tour Poitou-Charentes en Nouvelle-Aquitaine
4th Overall Tour de Pologne
2004
1st Overall Étoile de Bessèges

1st Stage 4

2nd Overall Four Days of Dunkirk
5th Overall Circuit de la Sarthe

1st Stage 3

5th Overall Tour du Languedoc-Rousillon
7th Overall Tour Méditerranéen
7th Paris–Camembert
2005
1st Paris–Camembert
2nd Road race, National Road Championships
5th Overall Tirreno–Adriatico
8th Overall Circuit de la Sarthe
10th Overall Tour Méditerranéen
2007
1st Mountains classification Tour de Romandie
1st Points classification Tour Down Under
2nd Overall Tour de Luxembourg

1st Stage 2

7th Overall Étoile de Bessèges
9th Overall Critérium International
9th Overall Paris–Corrèze
10th Paris–Camembert

== See also ==
- List of doping cases in cycling
- List of sportspeople sanctioned for doping offences
