= Alex Rodriguez =

American baseball player (born 1975)

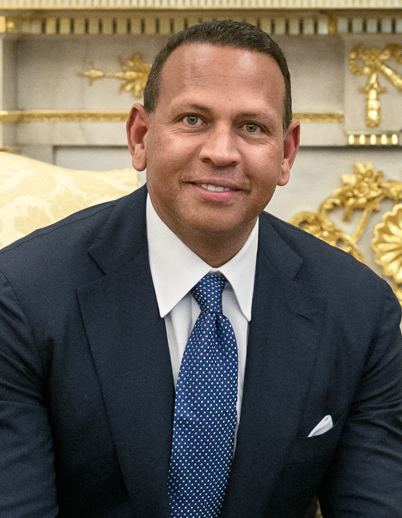
- Rodriguez in 2026
- Shortstop / Third baseman
- Born: July 27, 1975 (age 51); New York City, U.S.
- Batted: Right Threw: Right

MLB debut
- July 8, 1994, for the Seattle Mariners

Last MLB appearance
- August 12, 2016, for the New York Yankees

MLB statistics
- Batting average: .295
- Hits: 3,115
- Home runs: 696
- Runs batted in: 2,086
- Stats at Baseball Reference

Teams
- Seattle Mariners (1994–2000); Texas Rangers (2001–2003); New York Yankees (2004–2013, 2015–2016)

Career highlights and awards
- 14× All-Star (1996–1998, 2000–2008, 2010, 2011); World Series champion (2009); 3× AL MVP (2003, 2005, 2007); 2× Gold Glove Award (2002, 2003); 10× Silver Slugger Award (1996, 1998–2003, 2005, 2007, 2008); 4× AL Hank Aaron Award (2001–2003, 2007); MLB batting champion (1996); 5× AL home run leader (2001–2003, 2005, 2007); 2× MLB RBI leader (2002, 2007)
Medals
Men's baseball
Representing United States
World Junior Baseball Championship
Silver medal – second place	1992 Monterrey	Team

Alexander Emmanuel Rodriguez (born July 27, 1975), nicknamed "A-Rod", is an American former professional baseball shortstop and third baseman and current businessman. Rodriguez played 22 seasons in Major League Baseball (MLB) for the Seattle Mariners (1994–2000), Texas Rangers (2001–2003), and New York Yankees (2004–2013, 2015–2016). Rodriguez is the chairman and chief executive officer of A-Rod Corp as well as the chairman of Presidente beer. He owns a controlling interest in the National Basketball Association's Minnesota Timberwolves with Marc Lore. Rodriguez began his professional baseball career as one of the sport's most highly touted prospects and is considered one of the greatest baseball players of all time.

With a career .295 batting average, Rodriguez amassed over 600 home runs (696), over 2,000 runs batted in (RBI), over 2,000 runs scored, over 3,000 hits, and over 300 stolen bases, the only player in MLB history to achieve all of those feats. He was also a 14-time All-Star, winning three American League (AL) Most Valuable Player (MVP) Awards, ten Silver Slugger Awards, and two Gold Glove Awards. Rodriguez is also the career record holder for grand slams. During the 2000s decade, Rodriguez led all players in home runs (435), runs batted in (1,243), runs scored (1,190), and total bases (3,362).

The Mariners selected Rodriguez first overall in the 1993 MLB draft, and he debuted in the major leagues the following year at the age of 18. In 1996, he became the Mariners' starting shortstop, won the major league batting title, and finished second in voting for the AL MVP Award. His combination of power, speed, and defense made him a cornerstone of the franchise, but he left the team via free agency after the 2000 season to join the Rangers. The 10-year, $252 million contract he signed was the richest in baseball history at the time. He played at a high level in his three years with Texas, winning his first AL MVP Award win in 2003, but the team failed to make the playoffs. Before the 2004 season, Rodriguez was traded to the Yankees, for whom he converted to a third baseman to accommodate their shortstop Derek Jeter. He was named AL MVP in 2005 and 2007. He opted out of his contract after the 2007 season, then signed a new 10-year, $275 million deal with the Yankees, breaking his own record for the sport's most lucrative contract. He became the youngest player to hit 500 home runs, reaching the milestone in 2007. He was a part of the Yankees victory in the 2009 World Series over the Philadelphia Phillies, Rodriguez's only championship title. Toward the end of his career, he was hampered by hip and knee injuries, which caused him to become exclusively a designated hitter. He played his final game in professional baseball on August 12, 2016.

Despite denying in a 2007 interview that he had ever used performance-enhancing drugs, Rodriguez admitted in 2009 to having used steroids, saying he used them from 2001 to 2003 when playing for the Rangers due to "an enormous amount of pressure" to perform. While recovering from a hip injury in 2013, Rodriguez made headlines by feuding with team management over his rehabilitation and for having allegedly obtained performance-enhancing drugs as part of the Biogenesis scandal. In August 2013, MLB announced a 211-game suspension for Rodriguez for his involvement in the scandal. After an arbitration hearing, the suspension was reduced to 162 games, which kept him off the field for the entire 2014 season.

After retiring as a player, Rodriguez became a media personality, serving as a broadcaster for Fox Sports, a cast member of Shark Tank and a contributor to ABC News. In January 2018, ESPN announced that Rodriguez would be joining the broadcast team of Sunday Night Baseball.

== Early life ==
Rodriguez was born on July 27, 1975, in the Washington Heights section of Manhattan to Dominican immigrants Víctor Manuel Rodríguez Marcano and Lourdes Nelly Navarro Melo from San Juan de la Maguana, Dominican Republic. He was raised alongside his two half-siblings, Joe and Suzy, from his mother's first marriage. In 1979, when he was four years old, the family moved to the Dominican Republic, then to Miami, Florida, when he was in the fourth grade. His father played baseball for a team in the Dominican Republic and introduced him to the sport as a child. Growing up, Rodriguez's favorite baseball players were Keith Hernandez, Dale Murphy, and Cal Ripken Jr., and his favorite team was the New York Mets.

At the end of his freshman year at Christopher Columbus High School in Miami, Rodriguez transferred to Westminster Christian School in Palmetto Bay, Florida, where he was a star shortstop on the baseball team and played quarterback on the football team. In 100 games he batted .419 with 90 stolen bases. Westminster won the high school national championship in his junior year. He was first team prep All-American as a senior, hitting .505 with nine home runs, 36 runs batted in (RBIs), and 35 stolen bases in 35 attempts in 33 games. He was selected as the USA Baseball Junior Player of the Year and as Gatorade's national baseball student-athlete of the year. In 1993, Rodriguez became the first high school player to try out for the United States national baseball team. He was regarded as the top prospect in the country.

Rodriguez signed a letter of intent to play baseball for University of Miami and was also recruited by Miami to play quarterback for its football team. Rodriguez turned down the University of Miami baseball scholarship offer and never played college baseball, opting instead to sign with the Seattle Mariners after being selected first overall in the 1993 amateur draft at the age of 17.

== Professional career ==
=== Seattle Mariners ===
==== 1993: MLB draft ====
The Seattle Mariners selected Rodriguez with the first overall selection of the 1993 Major League Baseball draft. The Mariners signed him to a three-year contract worth $1.3 million, and a $1 million signing bonus.

==== 1994–1995 ====
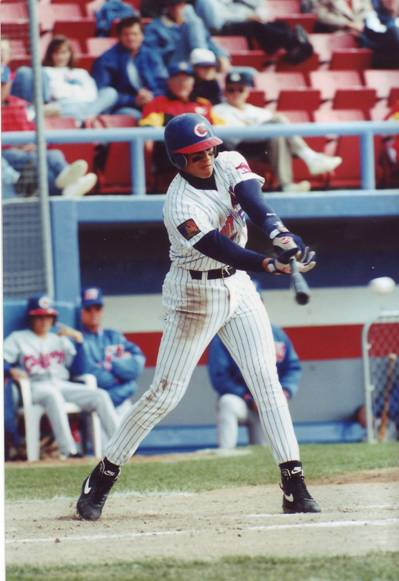
Rodriguez batting for the Calgary Cannons in 1994

In 1994, Rodriguez made his professional baseball debut as a minor league player with the Appleton Foxes of the Class A Midwest League. He was promoted to the Jacksonville Suns of the Double-A Southern League. He played in 17 games for Jacksonville, then was promoted to the Triple-A Calgary Cannons for 32 games before moving up to the major leagues. On July 8, Rodriguez debuted in the major leagues as a starting shortstop, just the third 18-year-old major league shortstop since 1900. He was also the first 18-year-old major league player since 1978 and the youngest position player in Seattle history. He remains the last 18-year-old to play in an MLB game, as of the end of the 2025 season. Rodriguez recorded his first major league hit when he singled off of Sergio Valdez on July 9 at Fenway Park. Rodriguez played in 17 games for the Mariners, compiling a .204 batting average, two RBIs, and three stolen bases. In August, The Mariners optioned Rodriguez to Triple-A Calgary. In 32 games for Calgary, he had 37 hits in 119 at-bats for a .311 batting average. He also compiled six home runs and 21 RBIs.

Rodriguez split most of the 1995 season between the Mariners and the Tacoma Rainiers of the PCL. He hit his first major league home run off Kansas City's Tom Gordon on June 12. Rodriguez permanently joined the Mariners roster in August and got his first taste of postseason play, albeit just two at-bats. Again, he was the youngest player in MLB. During the 1995 season, Rodriguez played 48 games for Seattle, batting .232 with five home runs, 19 RBI, and four stolen bases.

==== 1996–1997 ====
The following year, Rodriguez took over as the Mariners' regular shortstop and had his breakout season. He led the American League (AL) with a .358 batting average, the highest for an AL right-handed batter since Joe DiMaggio hit .381 in 1939 and the tenth-highest ever for a shortstop. He also had 36 home runs with 123 RBIs. At 21 years and one month, he was the third youngest AL batting leader ever behind Al Kaline (20) in 1955 and Ty Cobb (20) in 1907, and the third-youngest player in history with 35+ homers. He was also the first major league shortstop to win a batting title since 1960, and the first in the AL since 1944. At age 20 years, 11 months, he was the youngest shortstop in All-Star Game history. He also led the AL in runs (141), total bases (379), and doubles (54) and ranked among the league leaders in base hits (second, 215), extra-base hits (second, 91), multi-hit games (third, 65), slugging (fourth, .631), RBI (eighth, 123), and on-base percentage (eighth, .414). Rodriguez posted the highest totals ever for a shortstop in runs, hits, doubles, extra-base hits, and slugging, and tied most total bases, and established Seattle club records for average, runs, hits, doubles, and total bases, in a season that statistical analysts consider the best ever by a shortstop.

The Sporting News and Associated Press selected Rodriguez as their Major League Player of the Year. He finished second to Juan González in balloting for the AL Most Valuable Player (MVP) Award. He finished three points behind González (290–287), matching the second-closest AL MVP voting in history.

In 1997, Rodriguez batted .300 with 23 home runs and 84 RBIs. He hit for the cycle on June 5, becoming the second Mariner, and at 21 years, 10 months, the fifth-youngest player in history, to accomplish the feat. He was voted by fans to start the All-Star Game at shortstop for the AL team, becoming the first player other than Ripken to start at shortstop in 13 years. It was the first All-Star start of his career and his second consecutive All-Star Game.

==== 1998–2000 ====
Rodriguez rebounded in 1998, when he set the AL record for homers by a shortstop and became just the third member of the 40–40 club, (with 42 home runs and 46 stolen bases) and one of three shortstops in history to hit 40 home runs in a season. His 43.9 Power-speed number was, until 2023, the highest single-season power–speed number. He was selected as Players Choice AL Player of the Year, won his second Silver Slugger Award, and finished ninth in the MVP voting.

In 1999, Rodriguez had a .310 average, 42 home runs, and 111 RBIs, despite missing over 30 games with an injury and playing the second half of the season at Safeco Field, a considerably less hitter-friendly ballpark than the Kingdome. At the time, he was the youngest-ever player to record 100 home runs and 100 stolen bases, at 23 years and 309 days of age. That record lasted until April 2015, when Mike Trout reached the same milestone at 23 years and 253 days old.

Rodriguez entered 2000 as the cornerstone of the Mariners franchise, which had recently traded future Hall of Famers Randy Johnson and Ken Griffey Jr. Rodriguez produced great numbers, hitting 41 home runs with 132 RBIs and a .316 batting average. He set a career high for walks (100) and became the only shortstop to have 100 runs, RBI, and walks in the same season. He hit well in the playoffs as well (.409 batting average and .773 slugging percentage), but Seattle lost to the New York Yankees in the AL Championship Series (ALCS). He was selected as the Major League Player of the Year by Baseball America and finished third in the AL MVP voting.

=== Texas Rangers ===
Rodriguez became a free agent after the 2000 season. He eventually signed with the Texas Rangers, who had just finished in last place in the AL West. The contract was at the time the most lucrative contract in sports history: a 10-year deal worth $252 million (equivalent to $471 million in 2025). The deal was worth $63 million more than the second-richest baseball deal. The contract was highly criticized, because it tied up valuable payroll space that could have been spent to improve other areas, such as pitching. Dave McNally, one of the players who had successfully challenged the reserve clause in the 1970s to create free agency in baseball, said, "My first thought when I saw [reports that Rodriguez had signed] was: Did Texas offer him $250 million and he wanted two more? How did they get to $252 million?"

In an interview eight years later, Rodriguez said he regretted signing with Texas and wished he had signed with the New York Mets instead, and that he had heeded the advice of his agent, Scott Boras. (See Opt out controversy.)

==== 2001–2002 ====
Rodriguez's power-hitting numbers improved with his move to the Texas Rangers. In his first season there, Rodriguez produced one of the top offensive seasons ever for a shortstop, leading the AL with 52 home runs, 133 runs scored, and 393 total bases. He became the first player since 1932 with 50 homers and 200 hits in a season, the third shortstop to ever lead the league in homers, and the second AL player in the last 34 seasons (beginning 1968) to lead the league in runs, homers, and total bases; his total base figure is the most ever for a major league shortstop. His 52 homers made him the sixth youngest to ever reach 50 homers and were the highest total ever by a shortstop, surpassing Ernie Banks' record of 47 in 1958, and also the most ever for an infielder other than a first baseman, breaking Phillies 3B Mike Schmidt's mark of 48 in 1980. It was his fifth 30-homer campaign, tying Banks for most ever by a shortstop. He also tied for the league lead in extra-base hits (87) and ranked third in RBIs (135) and slugging (.622). He was also among the AL leaders in hits (fourth, 201), average (seventh, .318), and on-base percentage (eighth, .399). He established Rangers club records for homers, runs, total bases, and hit by pitches, had the second-most extra-base hits, and the fourth-highest RBI total. He led the club in runs, hits, doubles (34), homers, RBI, slugging, and on-base percentage and was second in walks (75), stolen bases (18), and game-winning RBI (14) while posting career highs for homers, RBI, and total bases. Rodriguez started 161 games at shortstop and one as the DH, the only major league player to start all of his team's games in 2001.

Rodriguez followed the previous year with a major league-best 57 home runs, 142 RBIs and 389 total bases in 2002, becoming the first player to lead the majors in all three categories since 1984. His nine home runs in April matched a team record that was shared (through 2008) with Iván Rodríguez (2000), Carl Everett (2003), and Ian Kinsler (2007). He had the sixth-most home runs in AL history, the most since Roger Maris' then-league record 61 in 1961 and the most ever for a shortstop for the second straight year. He won the Babe Ruth Home Run Award for leading MLB in homers that season. He also won his first Gold Glove Award, awarded for outstanding defense.

His 109 home runs in 2001–02 were the most ever by an AL right-handed batter in consecutive seasons (later surpassed by Aaron Judge in 2024–2025). However, the Rangers finished last in the AL West division in both years. He finished second in the MVP balloting to fellow shortstop Miguel Tejada, whose 103-win Oakland Athletics won the same division.

==== 2003 ====
The 2003 season was Rodriguez's last year with the Rangers. He led the AL in home runs, runs scored, and slugging percentage, and won his second consecutive Gold Glove Award. He also led the league in fewest at-bats per home run (12.9) and became the youngest player to hit 300 homers. He was tied with Jim Thome for the MLB lead in homers, and he won his second Babe Ruth Home Run Award.

Following five top-10 finishes in the AL MVP voting between 1996 and 2002, Rodriguez won his first MVP trophy. Rodriguez, a two-time runner up in the balloting by the Baseball Writers' Association of America, joined outfielder Andre Dawson from the 1987 Chicago Cubs as the only players to play on last-place teams and win the award.

Following the 2003 season, Texas set out to part ways with Rodriguez and his expensive contract. The Rangers initially agreed to a trade with the Boston Red Sox, sending Rodriguez to Boston for Manny Ramirez, 19-year old pitching prospect Jon Lester, and cash considerations. However, the MLB Players Association vetoed the deal because it called for a voluntary reduction in salary by Rodriguez. Despite the failed deal with the Red Sox, the Rangers named him team captain during that off-season.

=== New York Yankees ===
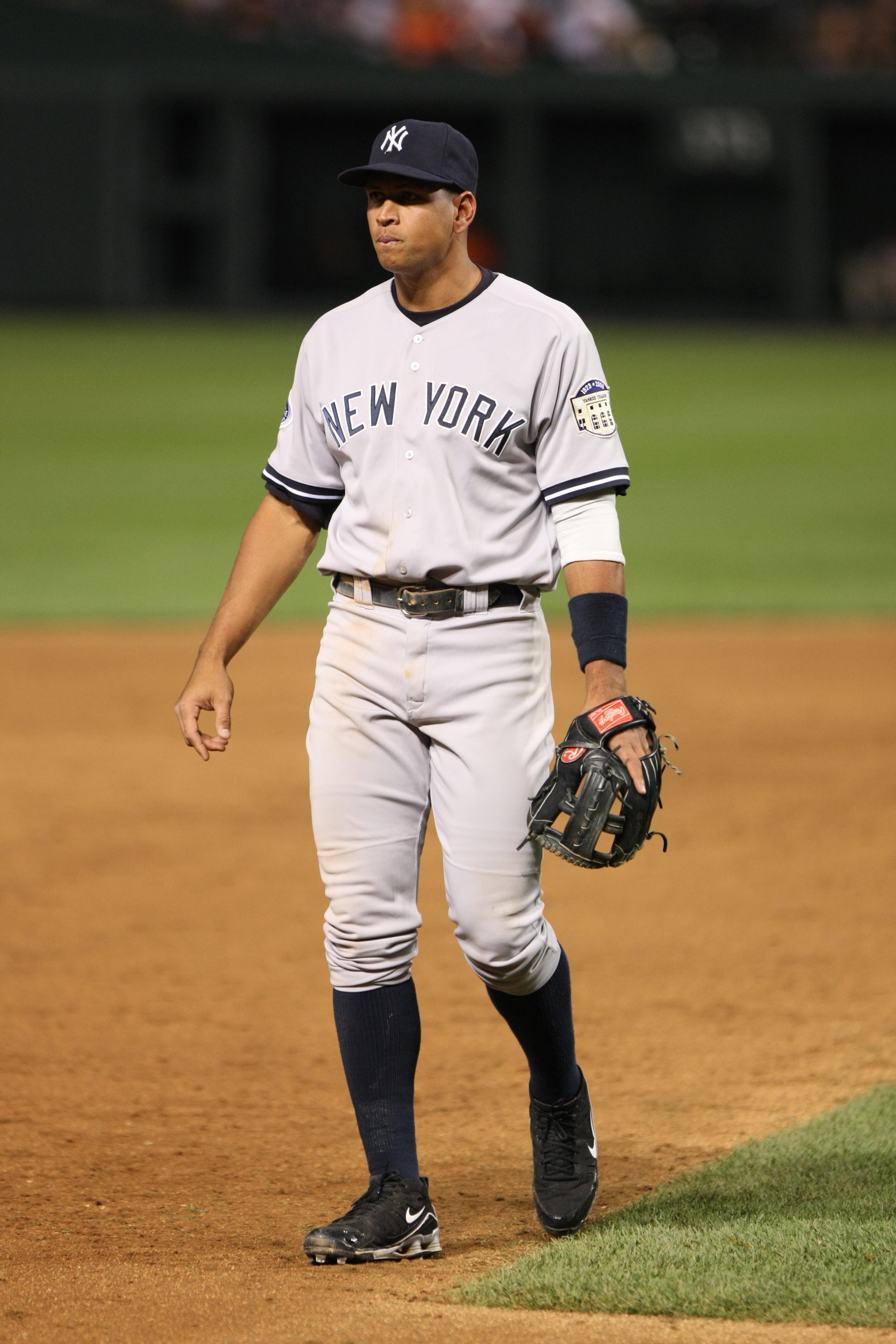
Rodriguez took over at third base after he was traded to the Yankees in 2004.

Yankees third baseman Aaron Boone suffered a knee injury while playing a game of pickup basketball that sidelined him for the entire 2004 season, creating a hole at third base.

On February 15, 2004, the Rangers traded Rodriguez to the New York Yankees for second baseman Alfonso Soriano and a player to be named later (Joaquín Árias was sent to the Rangers on March 24). The Rangers also agreed to pay $67 million of the $179 million left on Rodriguez's contract. Rodriguez agreed to switch positions from shortstop to third base, paving the way for the trade, because the popular Derek Jeter was already entrenched at shortstop. This was only the second time in MLB history that a reigning MVP was traded, with the first coming in 1914 when Eddie Collins was traded to the Chicago White Sox from the Philadelphia Athletics for cash considerations. Rodriguez also had to switch uniform numbers; he had worn 3 his entire career, but the number was retired by the Yankees in honor of Babe Ruth. Instead, Rodriguez chose to change his number to 13, in honor of Miami Dolphins quarterback Dan Marino. As a Miami native, Rodriguez had grown up watching Marino and also wore number 13 when he played quarterback in high school.

==== 2004 ====
During his first season with the Yankees, Rodriguez hit .286 with 36 home runs, 106 RBIs, 112 runs scored and 28 stolen bases. He became one of only three players in major league history to compile at least 35 home runs, 100 runs and 100 RBIs in seven consecutive seasons, joining Hall of Famers Babe Ruth and Jimmie Foxx. The 112 runs marked the ninth straight season in which he scored at least 100 runs, the longest such streak in MLB since Hank Aaron did it in 13 straight seasons from 1955 to 1967, and the longest in the AL since Mickey Mantle did it also in nine straight seasons from 1953 to 1961. During the 2004 season, he also became the youngest player ever to reach 350 home runs and the third youngest to reach 1,000 RBIs. He was elected to the AL All-Star Team, the eighth All-Star selection of his career and the first as a third baseman. On July 24, 2004, Rodriguez was hit by a pitch from Bronson Arroyo, which led to a scuffle with Boston Red Sox catcher Jason Varitek, and a bench-clearing brawl between both teams. On defense, he had the lowest range factor among non-platoon AL third basemen (2.39) in his first year at the position. He finished 14th in balloting for the AL MVP Award.

In the AL Division Series (ALDS), Rodriguez was a dominant hitter against the Minnesota Twins, batting .421 and slugging .737 while delivering two key extra-inning hits. Rodriguez's first season with the Yankees culminated in a dramatic playoff series against the team he had almost ended up playing for: the Yankees' bitter rival, the Boston Red Sox. In that ALCS, he equaled the single-game post-season record with five runs scored in Game 3 at Boston.

One of the most controversial plays of Rodriguez's career occurred late in Game 6 of the ALCS. With one out and Derek Jeter on first base in the bottom of the eighth inning, Rodriguez hit a slow roller between the pitcher's mound and the first-base line. Red Sox pitcher Bronson Arroyo fielded the ball and ran towards Rodriguez to apply a tag. As Arroyo reached towards him, Rodriguez swatted at his glove, knocking the ball loose. As the ball rolled away, Jeter scored all the way from first as Rodriguez took second on the play, which was initially ruled an error on Arroyo. However, the umpires quickly huddled, then ruled that Rodriguez was out for interference. Jeter was sent back to first base, and his run was nullified. The Yankees would then lose the ALCS to the eventual World Series champion Red Sox after leading the series three games to none.

==== 2005–2006 ====
In 2005, Rodriguez hit .321, leading the AL with 124 runs and 48 home runs while driving in 130 runs. He became the first Yankee to win the AL home run title since Reggie Jackson (41) in 1980. He also became one of only two players in major league history to compile at least 35 home runs, 100 runs and 100 RBIs in eight consecutive seasons (Jimmie Foxx accomplished the feat in nine straight seasons from 1932 to 1940). Rodriguez set the franchise record for most home runs in a single season by a right-handed batter, surpassing Joe DiMaggio's mark of 46 in 1937. (Judge hit 62 in 2022.) His 47 home runs from the third base position are a single-season AL record. Rodriguez hit 26 home runs at Yankee Stadium, establishing the single-season club record for right-handed batters (previously held by DiMaggio in 1937 and Gary Sheffield in 2004 and surpassed by Judge at the new Yankee Stadium in 2022). On June 8, at 29 years, 316 days old, he became the youngest player in MLB history to reach the 400 home run mark. 2005 also marked the tenth straight season that Rodriguez scored at least 100 runs. On defense, however, he had the lowest range factor in the league at third for the second straight season (2.62).

On April 26, Rodriguez hit three home runs off Angels pitcher Bartolo Colón and drove in 10 runs. The 10 RBIs were the most by a Yankee since Tony Lazzeri established the franchise and AL record with 11 on May 24, 1936. Rodriguez became the 11th major leaguer to accomplish the feat.

Rodriguez won his second AL MVP Award in three seasons, becoming the fifth player to win this award with two different teams, joining Mickey Cochrane, Jimmie Foxx, Frank Robinson and Barry Bonds. He also became the first AL player from outside the AL West to win the award since Mo Vaughn of the Boston Red Sox won in 1995. Rodriguez was also named the shortstop on the MLB Latino Legends Team in 2005.

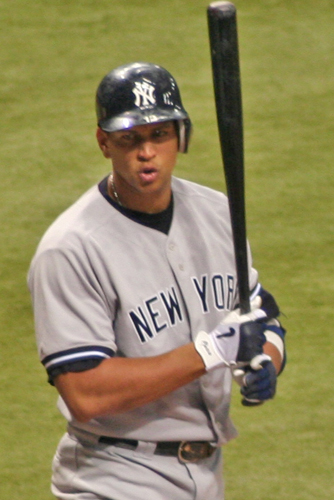
Rodriguez reacting to a called strike in a game against Tampa Bay

Prior to the season, Rodriguez played for the U.S. in the 2006 World Baseball Classic.

Rodriguez was again an All-Star in 2006. His 2,000th hit, on July 21, 2006 − six days prior to his 31st birthday − was also his 450th home run. Rodriguez became the youngest player in baseball history to reach 450 home runs (surpassing Ken Griffey Jr., by 267 days), and the eighth player to reach 2,000 hits before turning 31. Ty Cobb reached the mark while still 29, while Rogers Hornsby, Mel Ott, Hank Aaron, Joe Medwick, Jimmie Foxx, and Robin Yount all achieved their 2,000th hit at age 30. All seven are members of baseball's Hall of Fame.

For the season, Rodriguez finished fourth in the league in RBI (121), fifth in runs scored (113), eighth in home runs (35) and walks (90), and ninth in OBP (.392). He also led all AL third basemen in errors, with 24, and had the lowest fielding percentage (.937) and—for the third straight season—range factor (2.50) among them. Rodriguez also became the second player in major league history to record at least 35 home runs, 100 runs, and 100 RBIs in nine consecutive seasons, joining Foxx. It was Rodriguez's 11th consecutive season with more than 100 runs scored, the longest such streak in AL history since Lou Gehrig did so in 13 straight seasons (1926–38). Despite this success, it was perceived as one of his lesser-accomplished seasons and was harshly criticized throughout the 2006 season. He has commented that 2006 was his most difficult season as a professional.

==== 2007 ====
When Rodriguez reported to camp in 2007, he had reduced his body fat from 16% the year before to 9%. He made light of this fact during a Late Show with David Letterman sketch that was filmed during Spring training, which featured him shirtless being rubbed down with suntan lotion. He revealed to the press that he and Jeter were no longer close friends. Rodriguez also reduced his high leg kick at the plate, increasing his bat speed, making him less-apt to strike out and a more dangerous hitter.

In the Yankees' fourth game of the season, Rodriguez hit two home runs against the Baltimore Orioles at Yankee Stadium, including his 14th-career grand slam to end the game. The walk-off grand slam was the third of his career, tying the major league mark for game-ending grand slams shared by Vern Stephens and Cy Williams. Rodriguez also began the season by becoming the ninth major leaguer—and first Yankee—to hit six home runs in the first seven games of the season. Rodriguez also became the first Yankee to hit seven home runs in the first ten games of the season.

On April 23, Rodriguez became the first player in major league history to hit 14 home runs in a span of 18 games, and also tied the MLB record for most home runs in April. His total of 34 RBIs in April was one short of Juan González's MLB record. In a game against the Toronto Blue Jays on May 30, Rodriguez sparked controversy when he shouted during a routine play and an infielder let a pop fly drop, costing the Blue Jays three runs. The Yankees went on to win the game, 10–5. On July 12, Rodriguez hit his 150th career home run in a Yankees uniform. This made him the first, and so far only, player in major league history to ever hit 150 home runs for three different teams. He became the third player to hit at least 100 home runs for three teams, following Reggie Jackson and Darrell Evans.

Rodriguez hit his 500th career home run against pitcher Kyle Davies of the Kansas City Royals on August 4. Rodriguez became the youngest player ever to reach 500 home runs at 32 years, 8 days. He surpassed the nearly 67-year record held by Jimmie Foxx, who hit his 500th home run at 32 years, 338 days during the final week of the 1940 MLB season. On September 25, Rodriguez became the fifth MLB player to record a 50-home run, 150-RBI season when he hit a grand slam. Rodriguez is the most recent player to have recorded at least 150 RBIs in one season, as of 2025.

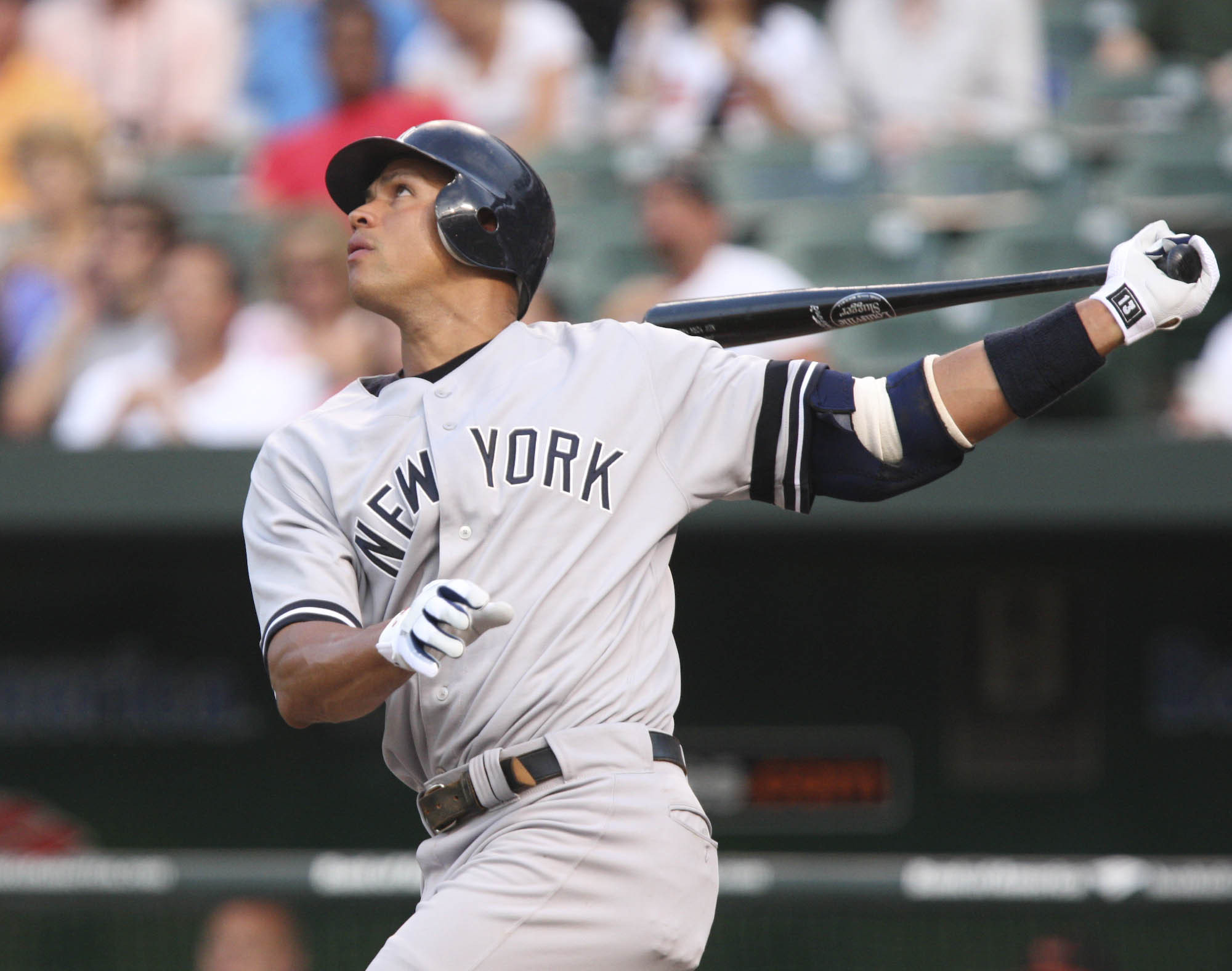
Rodriguez batting in 2007

In 2007, Rodriguez became the first player in major league history to have at least 35 home runs, 100 runs, and 100 RBIs in 10 consecutive seasons, surpassing Jimmie Foxx (nine consecutive seasons). He led the AL in home runs (54), RBIs (156), slugging percentage (.645), OPS (1.067), total bases (376), and times on base (299), and was second in hit by pitch (21), extra-base hits (85), and at bats per home run (10.8), fourth in on-base percentage (.422) and sacrifice flies (9), seventh in walks (95) and plate appearances (708), eighth in intentional walks (11), and ninth in games (158). He led MLB in home runs and won his third Babe Ruth Home Run Award.

After the season, Rodriguez was named the AL MVP for the third time in his career, receiving 26 first-place votes out of a possible 28. He also won the Silver Slugger Award for his position, the Players Choice Award for Outstanding AL Player, and the Players Choice Award for Player of the Year.

===== Opt-out controversy =====
The 2007 season marked the last year of Rodriguez's 10-year, $252 million contract before he opted out and became a free agent again. Rodriguez had repeatedly stated during the 2007 season that he would like to remain a Yankee for the rest of his career. On October 28, Rodriguez's agent, Scott Boras, announced that he would not renew his contract with the Yankees citing that he "was unsure of the future composition" of the team. Because of the opt-out, the Yankees also lost $21.3 million in remaining payments from the Rangers as part of their agreement from the 2004 trade. Rodriguez received a slew of criticism from fans and writers alike not only for opting out, but also for not meeting with Yankee management before he did. He was further criticized for the timing of his announcement, during the eighth inning of Game 4 of the World Series, as the Boston Red Sox were wrapping up their victory over the Colorado Rockies; even MLB's chief operating officer, Bob DuPuy, called it an attempt by Boras to "try to put his selfish interests and that of one individual player above the overall good of the game."

Teammate Mariano Rivera convinced Rodriguez to contact the New York Yankees ownership. He contacted them directly, bypassing Boras (Boras also apologized for the timing of the announcement). Subsequently, Rodriguez issued a statement on his website, saying that he wished to stay with the Yankees. On November 15, the Yankees and Rodriguez agreed on the "basic framework" of a 10-year, $275 million contract (equivalent to $514 million in 2025) that would have him playing until he was 42. The contract, finalized December 13, included various multimillion-dollar incentives for breaking career home run milestones.

==== 2008 ====
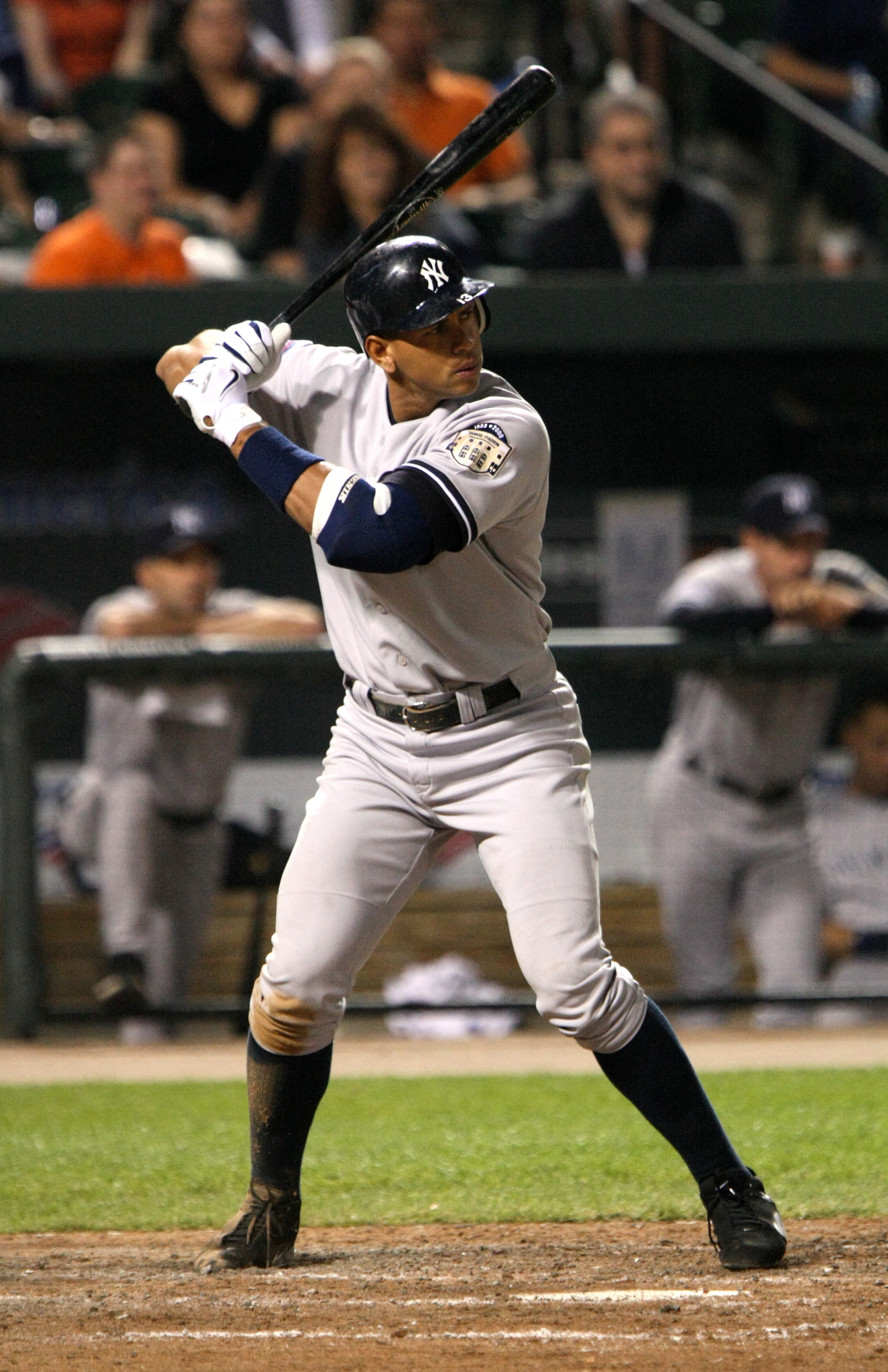
Rodriguez at bat in 2008

Rodriguez hit his 549th home run in a September 3, 2008, game against the Tampa Bay Rays. The opposing manager objected that the ball was foul, and for the first time in MLB history, instant replay (a process officially introduced a few days earlier) was used to review the play and uphold the umpires' ruling. He was one of only four batters in the AL to have at least 18 home runs and 18 stolen bases in both 2007 and 2008, along with Torii Hunter, Ian Kinsler, and Grady Sizemore. Rodriguez hit a home run every 14.6 at-bats in 2008, the second-best ratio on the team behind Jason Giambi. Rodriguez played 138 games during the 2008 season with a .302 average, 35 home runs, 103 RBI, and an AL best .573 slugging percentage.

==== 2009 ====
===== February: Report of positive test for steroids =====
On February 7, 2009, Sports Illustrated reported that Rodriguez tested positive for testosterone and the anabolic steroid Primobolan in 2003. Rodriguez's name appears on a government-sealed list of 104 major-league players (out of 1200 tested) who came up positive for performance-enhancing drugs. The report was compiled as part of MLB's 2003 survey to determine whether a mandatory random drug testing program might be necessary. At the time, there was no penalty or punishment for a positive steroid test. Rodriguez did not immediately confirm the allegations, deferring at first to the players' union. Two days after the allegations, Rodriguez admitted to steroid use from 2001 to 2003, claiming that he ceased using such substances after spring training that year.

===== 2009 regular season =====
Prior to the 2009 season, Rodriguez was scheduled to represent the Dominican Republic in the 2009 World Baseball Classic, but he was forced to withdraw when an MRI revealed a cyst in his right hip. When he went to have the cyst drained, it was discovered that he was also suffering from a torn labrum in the same hip. Rodriguez opted to undergo an arthroscopic procedure with a recovery period of six to nine weeks, instead of the usual three to four months. Although the procedure should have allowed him to make it through the season without any complications, he required a second, more extensive surgery in the off-season.

After missing spring training and the first month of the season, Rodriguez returned to the Yankees in a May 8 game against the Baltimore Orioles and hit a three-run home run on the first pitch of his first at-bat. The Yankees had stumbled to a 13–15 record in Rodriguez's absence, and his return fortified the lineup and provided much-needed protection for three-hole hitter Mark Teixeira, who was a notoriously slow starter. Rodriguez also supplied some late-game heroics. On May 16, his two-run walk-off home run in the bottom of the eleventh inning gave the Yankees a 6–4 win over the Minnesota Twins. One week later, he hit a game-tying solo home run in the bottom of the ninth off Philadelphia Phillies closer Brad Lidge in a game the Yankees would go on to win, 5–4.

By early June, the Yankees had surged to first place in the AL East. The club's fortunes changed later in the month, when Rodriguez fell into a slump that saw his batting average plummet as the Yankees fell to second place. On June 23, Rodriguez became the eighth active player to reach 8,000 career at-bats in the seventh inning of the Yankees and Braves game. On June 25, Rodriguez belted homer 563 of his career, off Atlanta Braves starter Derek Lowe, and tying Reggie Jackson for 11th on the all-time home run list. On June 26, Rodriguez surpassed Jackson for 11th on the all-time home run list, against the New York Mets in the Subway Series, and against the Angels on July 11, Rodriguez passed Rafael Palmeiro for 10th place; it was his 65th home run against Anaheim, the most by any active player against an opponent.

On October 4, during the final game of the season, Rodriguez hit two home runs in the sixth inning that drove in seven runs, setting an AL record for most RBI by a batter in a single inning, and giving him his 12th consecutive season, 13 overall, of reaching 30 home runs and 100 RBIs, breaking a tie with Manny Ramirez, Babe Ruth and Jimmie Foxx for the most in MLB history.

===== Postseason =====
Dating back to Game 4 of the 2004 ALCS, Rodriguez had batted with 38 runners on base over a span of 61 postseason at-bats. He stranded every one of them, going 0-for-29 with runners on base. However, in the first game of the 2009 ALDS against Minnesota, he hit two RBI singles, both with two outs. In Game 2, he hit an RBI single in the sixth, and hit a game-tying homer off closer Joe Nathan in the bottom of the ninth inning. In Game 3, he again hit a game-tying home run. In the ALCS, Rodriguez hit his third game-tying home run of the postseason in Game 2 in the bottom of the 11th against Angels closer Brian Fuentes. For the series, he batted 9–21 (.429) with three home runs and six runs batted in.

The Yankees faced the Phillies in the World Series. In Game 3, Rodriguez hit what appeared to be a double off a camera perched atop the outfield wall, but after protest by Yankee manager Joe Girardi, the play was reviewed and ruled a home run. In Game 4, Rodriguez drove in the go-ahead run with two outs in the ninth inning off closer Brad Lidge. The Yankees would go on to win the game 7–4 to take a 3-games-to-1 lead in the series. Despite a 2–4 performance with three RBI in Game 5, the Yankees lost 8–6 to force the Series to return to the Bronx for Game 6. Rodriguez was 1–2 with 2 walks and two runs scored in Game 6, as the Yankees went on to defeat the Phillies 7–3 for their 27th World Series championship, the only one of Rodriguez's career. Having reversed his postseason misfortunes, he was the Babe Ruth Award winner as the 2009 postseason MVP, in which he batted .365 with six home runs and 18 RBI.

==== 2010–2012 ====
On August 4, 2010, on the three-year anniversary of his 500th home run, Rodriguez became the seventh player in major league history to hit 600 home runs, hitting number 600 off Shaun Marcum of the Toronto Blue Jays, becoming the youngest player to do so at 35 years and 8 days old. On August 14, Rodriguez hit three home runs in a game against the Kansas City Royals. In the top of the sixth, he hit his first, a solo dinger to left center. In the top of the seventh, he hit his second, a two-run shot to dead center. In the top of the ninth, he hit his third, a towering two-run blast into the waterfall in Kauffman Stadium. On September 6, he recorded his 100th RBI; it was the 14th year he had reached the mark, the most times of any player in baseball history. On September 29, he hit his 30th home run of the season, recording his MLB-record 13th straight year of at least 30 home runs and 100 RBIs, breaking a tie with Jimmie Foxx, who had 12 seasons.

In 2011, Rodriguez batted .295 with 13 home runs and 52 RBIs prior to the All-Star break. Despite good production, Rodriguez suffered the longest single-season home run drought of his career by not hitting one in 85 at-bats. Although elected to start the game, Rodriguez opted for arthroscopic surgery on his knee to repair a torn meniscus that impacted his power, and was placed on the disabled list. On top of recovery, Rodriguez was facing serious allegations that he participated in illegal, underground poker games. One of those games reportedly turned violent and cocaine was openly used. However, Rodriguez denied through a representative that he ever participated in illegal poker games. An MLB Executive has said that if Rodriguez was indeed proven guilty, he may face a suspension; MLB had warned Rodriguez in 2005 not to participate in such games.

Rodriguez returned to the Yankees on August 21, playing third base against the Minnesota Twins, going 0-for-4. He sustained another injury with a jammed thumb while trying to make a play in that game. He returned to the Yankees on August 25, going 2-for-4 with two singles in a win for the Yankees over the Oakland Athletics. On August 26, Rodriguez hit his first home run since coming off the disabled list, a solo shot off Baltimore Orioles pitcher Tommy Hunter. He concluded the season with 16 home runs and 62 RBIs in 99 games, ending his MLB-record streak of 13 straight seasons of 30 homers and 100 RBIs.

Rodriguez hit his 23rd career grand slam off Atlanta Braves relief pitcher Jonny Venters on June 12, 2012, which tied Lou Gehrig for the most in MLB history. In a road loss versus the Seattle Mariners on July 24, 2012, Rodriguez took a hit to the hand during an eighth-inning at bat versus Seattle starting pitcher Félix Hernández. The injury was later described as a non-displaced fracture. Rodriguez was placed on the disabled list. Earlier in the same game, Hernandez struck out Rodriguez in the sixth inning, making Rodriguez the fifth player to record 2,000 career strikeouts in MLB history.

During the 2012 postseason, Rodriguez was removed for a pinch hitter multiple times and did not start many times. He batted 3-for-25 overall, and went 0-for-18 with 12 strikeouts against right-handed pitchers. He batted .111 in the 2012 ALCS. The Yankees were eliminated by the Tigers in the 2012 ALCS.

==== 2013 ====
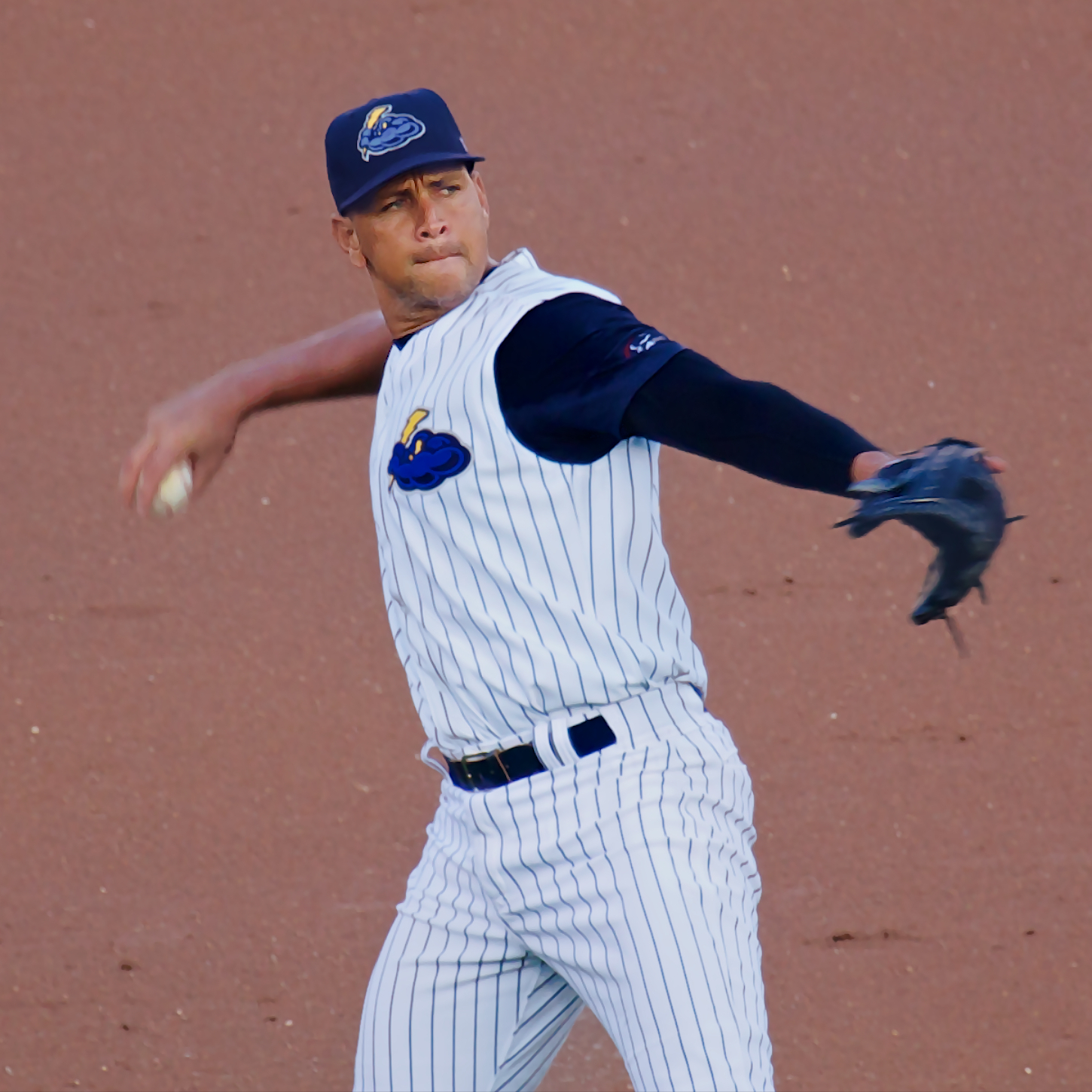
Rodriguez playing for the Trenton Thunder, the Yankees' AA affiliate, in 2013

On January 16, 2013, Rodriguez underwent arthroscopic surgery in his hip to repair a torn labrum. It was the second time in four years that he had the surgery, although the operation was more serious than before. Rodriguez began the 2013 season on the 60-day disabled list.

While rehabilitating his hip, Rodriguez was embroiled in a series of negative headlines: he became a central figure of the Biogenesis scandal and MLB's investigation into his possible connection to performance-enhancing drugs. Around the same time, Rodriguez announced on Twitter that his doctor had medically cleared him to play in games. Yankees general manager Brian Cashman, much to his dismay, soon revealed that Rodriguez's doctor did not have such authority to clear him.

Rodriguez played his first rehab assignment game on July 2, 2013, with the Yankees Class-A Low affiliate, the Charleston RiverDogs. He continued his rehabilitation and played for the Yankees Triple-A team, the Scranton/Wilkes-Barre RailRiders on July 18. Two days prior to his scheduled promotion to the major league roster, Rodriguez sustained a new injury, as an MRI later revealed a Grade 1 quad strain, delaying his return and forcing him to continue rehabilitating in the minor leagues. Rodriguez independently sought a second opinion on his quad strain on July 24 with a doctor who stated that there did not appear to be an injury; the Yankees front office expressed further dismay, claiming that he violated league rules for seeking a second opinion without the team's permission. He completed his rehabilitation program with the Yankees' Double-A affiliate Trenton Thunder.

Rodriguez made his 2013 return with the Yankees on August 5, which was the same day that MLB announced he would be suspended—pending an appeal—through the 2014 season for his role in the Biogenesis scandal. On August 11, Rodriguez hit his first home run of the season off Detroit Tigers pitcher Justin Verlander. With the home run, Rodriguez passed Stan Musial for fifth place in career RBIs. Rodriguez continued to feud with the Yankees front office following his return, as his lawyers accused the team, and specifically Christopher S. Ahmad, of mishandling his hip injury in several ways; Rodriguez's legal team contended that the team withheld the injury from him and continued to play him in 2012, despite his condition. Yankees team president Randy Levine expressed negative comments towards Rodriguez, saying that he would "feel happy if Rodriguez never played again". In response to the accusations, Cashman said, "I'm not comfortable talking to Alex about this because we feel we are in a litigious environment. Hello and goodbye, that's about it." He added, "It's not just Yankees' management. He's putting it at the level of our trainers, our medical staff. The organization. The team."

During a game against the Red Sox on August 18, Rodriguez was involved in key moments against Ryan Dempster. The first time he faced Dempster, Rodriguez was hit by a pitch on a 3–0 count, leading to home plate umpire Brian O'Nora warning both benches and ejecting Girardi, while Dempster was allowed to stay in the game. Later in the top of the sixth inning, Rodriguez encountered Dempster again, hitting a 442-foot home run to straightaway center. The Yankees won 9–6, and Dempster, who hit Rodriguez before, was suspended five games by the league with an undisclosed fine (although he did not miss a start).

On September 20, at Yankee Stadium, Rodriguez hit his 24th career grand slam, an opposite field 654th career home run, off George Kontos of the San Francisco Giants, breaking the all-time grand slam record, formerly held by Lou Gehrig. For the 2013 season, Rodriguez played in only 44 games batting .244 with seven home runs and 19 RBI.

==== 2014: Suspension due to Biogenesis scandal ====
Rodriguez's suspension that was announced the previous season but delayed pending an appeal, was upheld, resulting in him being suspended for the entirety of the 2014 regular season and postseason. At the end of the 2014 season, general manager Brian Cashman announced that Rodriguez would no longer serve as an everyday third baseman after the team's signing of Chase Headley, and would instead serve as a designated hitter.

==== 2015 ====
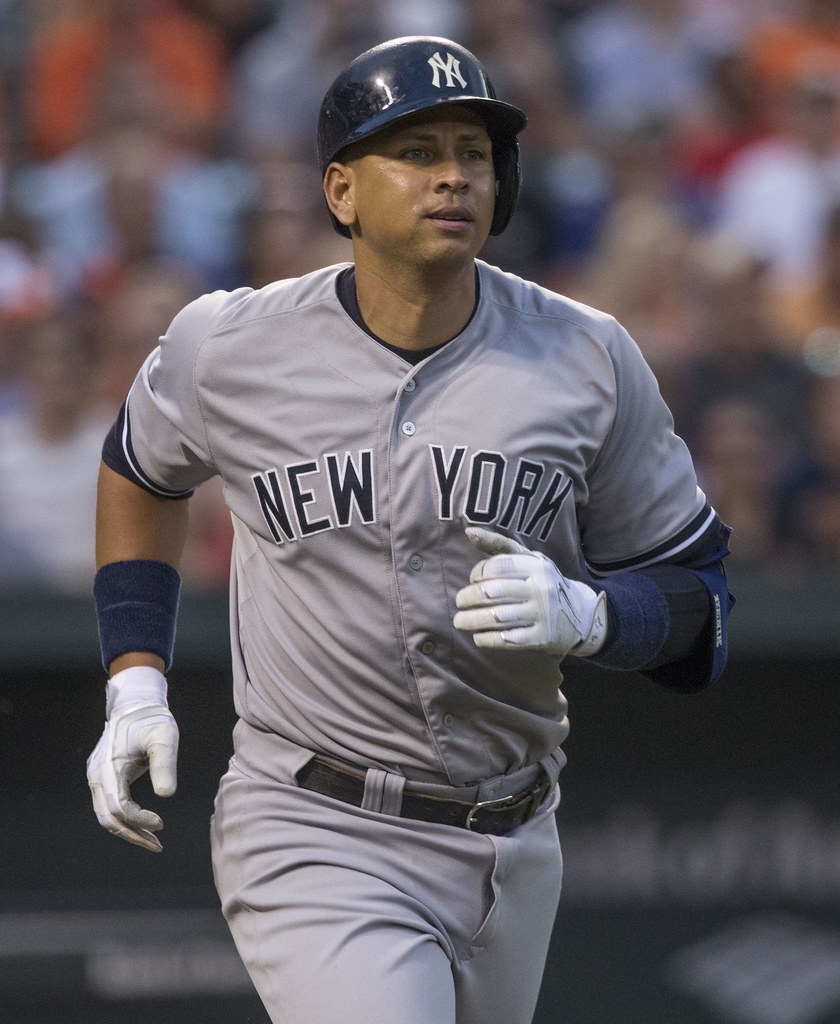
Rodriguez running the bases in 2015

In the off-season, during the week of January 19, 2015, it was reported that Rodriguez met with new Commissioner of Baseball Rob Manfred. The pair reportedly had a "positive discussion...in which Rodriguez apologized, while promising to behave in the future". On February 17, 2015, Rodriguez issued a hand-written letter of apology to "Major League Baseball, the Yankees, the Steinbrenner family, the Players Association and you, the fans".

Rodriguez reported to New York Yankees' 2015 spring training camp three days early. Girardi planned to play Rodriguez at first base during spring training to assess whether he could be played there, a first for his career.

Rodriguez played his first game after his suspension on opening day against the Blue Jays at Yankee Stadium. He served as the designated hitter, going 1 for 2 with a walk as the Yankees lost to the Blue Jays 1–6. On April 17, his first multi-HR game – and third and fourth home runs – of the season included a blast off Nate Karns of Tampa Bay that traveled 471 feet (144 m), providing four total RBIs in a 5–4 win. In a pinch-hit appearance against the Red Sox on May 1, Rodriguez hit his 660th career home run off reliever Junichi Tazawa, tying Willie Mays for fourth place on the all-time home run list. On May 7, Rodriguez hit his 661st career home run off Orioles pitcher Chris Tillman for sole possession of fourth place on the all-time home run list. On May 27, Rodriguez set an AL record for the most career RBI, passing Lou Gehrig, also moving him into third on the all-time list.

With his 666th career home run against Bud Norris of the Orioles on June 13, Rodriguez drove in his 2,000th and 2,001st career runs. However, opinions varied on whether he was the second (Elias Sports Bureau, trailing Aaron), third (MLB, trailing Aaron and Ruth), or fourth player (Baseball-Reference.com, trailing Aaron, Ruth, and Cap Anson) in MLB history to attain 2,000 RBIs. Rodriguez's next home run was also his 3,000th career hit, making him the 29th player to reach the milestone. He hit it against the Tigers' Justin Verlander in a 7–2 win, joining Wade Boggs and Jeter – both former Yankees – as the only players to hit a home run for his 3,000th hit. With his next hit on June 20, Rodriguez surpassed Roberto Clemente, the eleventh player in MLB history to have recorded 3,000 hits. On July 25, against the Twins in Minnesota, and two days before his 40th birthday, Rodríguez became the fifth-oldest player to hit three home runs in one game.

In his first 95 games of the season, Rodriguez hit 24 homers and produced an OPS of .930. After being mired in a 72-at-bat slump without a home run until August 18 against the Twins, he hit his 25th home run which was also his 25th career grand slam, extending his MLB record. The home run also drove in the go-ahead runs for an 8–4 Yankees win.

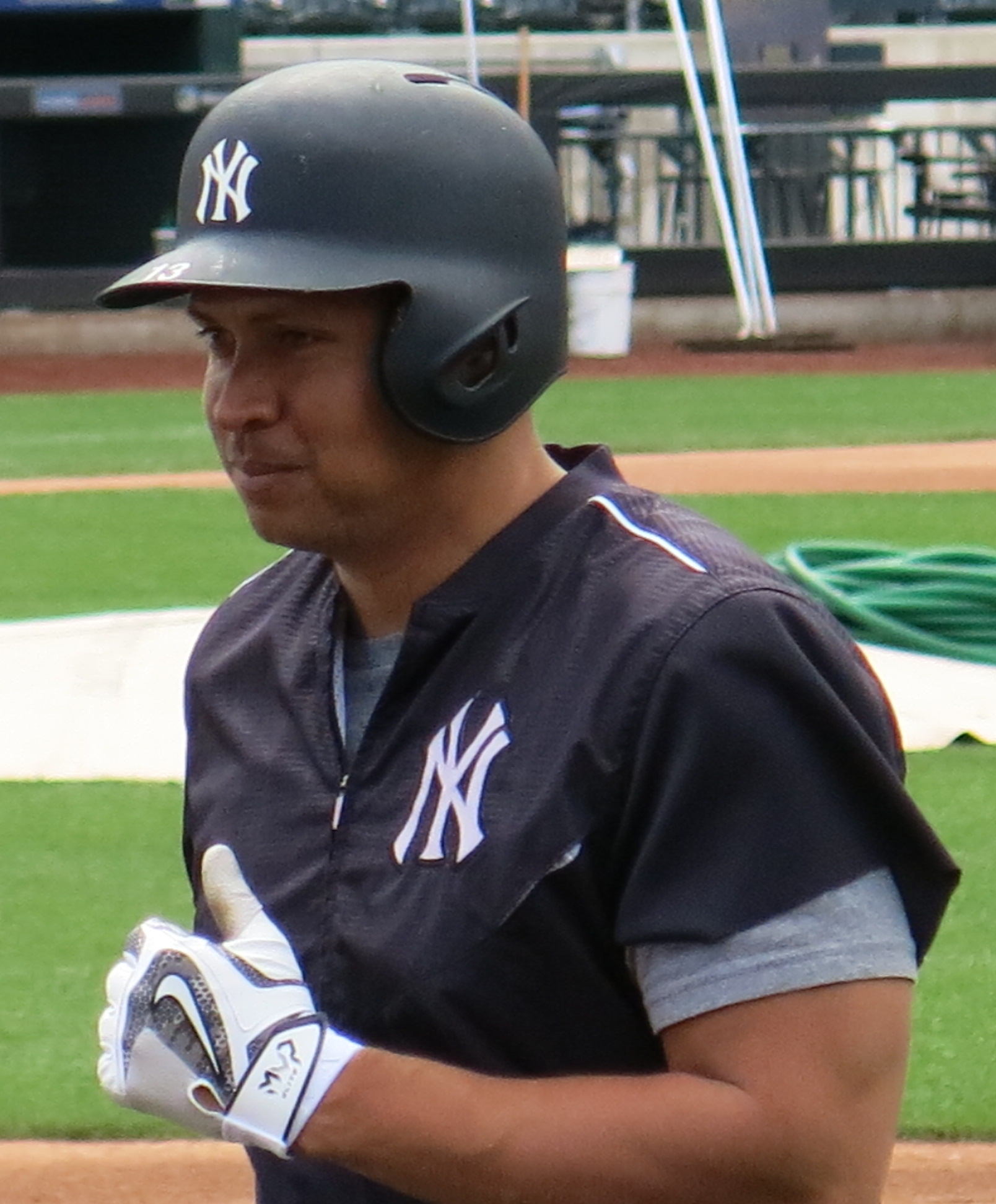
Rodriguez with the Yankees in 2016

From August 1 until the end of the season, Rodriguez appeared in 56 games, batting .191, .678 OPS, nine home runs, and struck out 59 times in 183 at-bats. The first base experiment yielded two total appearances in 2015. He finished with 33 home runs, 86 RBI, 131 hits, and a .252 batting average. He led the Yankees in home runs, on-base percentage, slugging percentage, on-base plus slugging, and bases-on-balls. Rodriguez reached 30+ home runs for the 15th time in his career, tying Aaron for the most 30-home-run seasons in history.

==== 2016 ====
On April 17, 2016, Rodriguez became the 19th player to make 12,000 career plate appearances. On May 4, the Yankees placed him on the 15-day disabled list due to a right hamstring strain. On May 24, the Yankees sent him on a rehab assignment to the Double-A Trenton Thunder, and activated him on May 26. The next day, he hit his 30th career home run at Tropicana Field, which traveled an estimated 440 feet (130 m), as the Yankees defeated Tampa Bay, 4–1. However, for much of the season, Rodriguez notably struggled to adequately produce, enduring prolonged slumps as his role dwindled from everyday designated hitter to pinch hitter. In July, he had two extra base hits, including his 696th career home run.

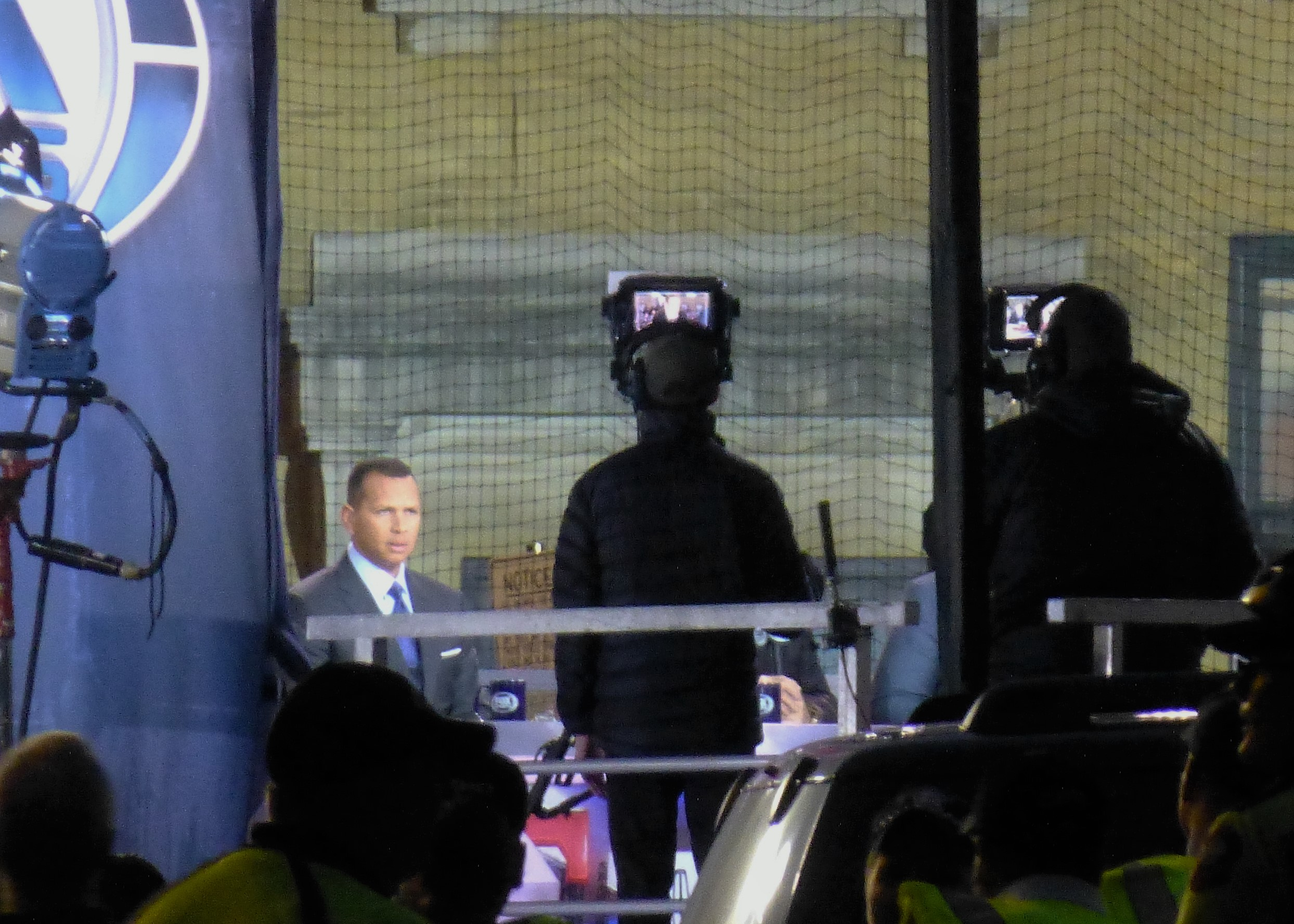
Rodriguez working as a postgame television commentator during the 2016 World Series

At a press conference held on August 7, Rodriguez announced that he would play in his final game for the Yankees on the following Friday, August 12, against the Rays at Yankee Stadium. It was also noted that the Yankees would sign him to a new contract that would keep him in the organization through 2017 as a special instructor and advisor. In the offseason, Rodriguez would join the Yankees' front office as a special advisor. The club commemorated Rodriguez's final game as a Yankee, thanking him in front of a sold-out crowd for his efforts with a tribute of highlights on the stadium videoboard, a presentation of a framed number 13 jersey, and a base autographed by teammates. At the plate, he batted third and started as the designated hitter, going 1-for-4 with an RBI double. In the ninth inning, he was brought onto the field at third base for one batter − his only defensive appearance for the Yankees in 2016 − and departed the field to a "raucous ovation" from the fans. The next day, the Yankees granted him his unconditional release. His vacated roster spot was filled by future MVP Aaron Judge.

Rumors swirled regarding Rodriguez's future in baseball; the Miami Marlins were interested in signing him to play first base until his spokesman Ron Berkowitz emailed the media on August 15 and said on behalf of Rodriguez, "I want to put all this talk to rest about Alex playing for any team this season. It's not happening. Like he said Friday night, he is happy and he is going to take some time to relax and hang with his family and friends." Rodriguez ended the season playing 65 games with a .200 batting average, nine home runs and 31 RBIs.

In January 2017, Rodriguez's spokesman said that he would not play for any other team in the coming year, and would remain a "special advisor" to Yankees owner Hal Steinbrenner.

== Media career ==
=== Television ===
Rodriguez became a guest judge on Shark Tank in 2017. That same year, he signed a deal with ABC News network to serve as a contributor to ABC World News Tonight, Good Morning America, and Nightline.

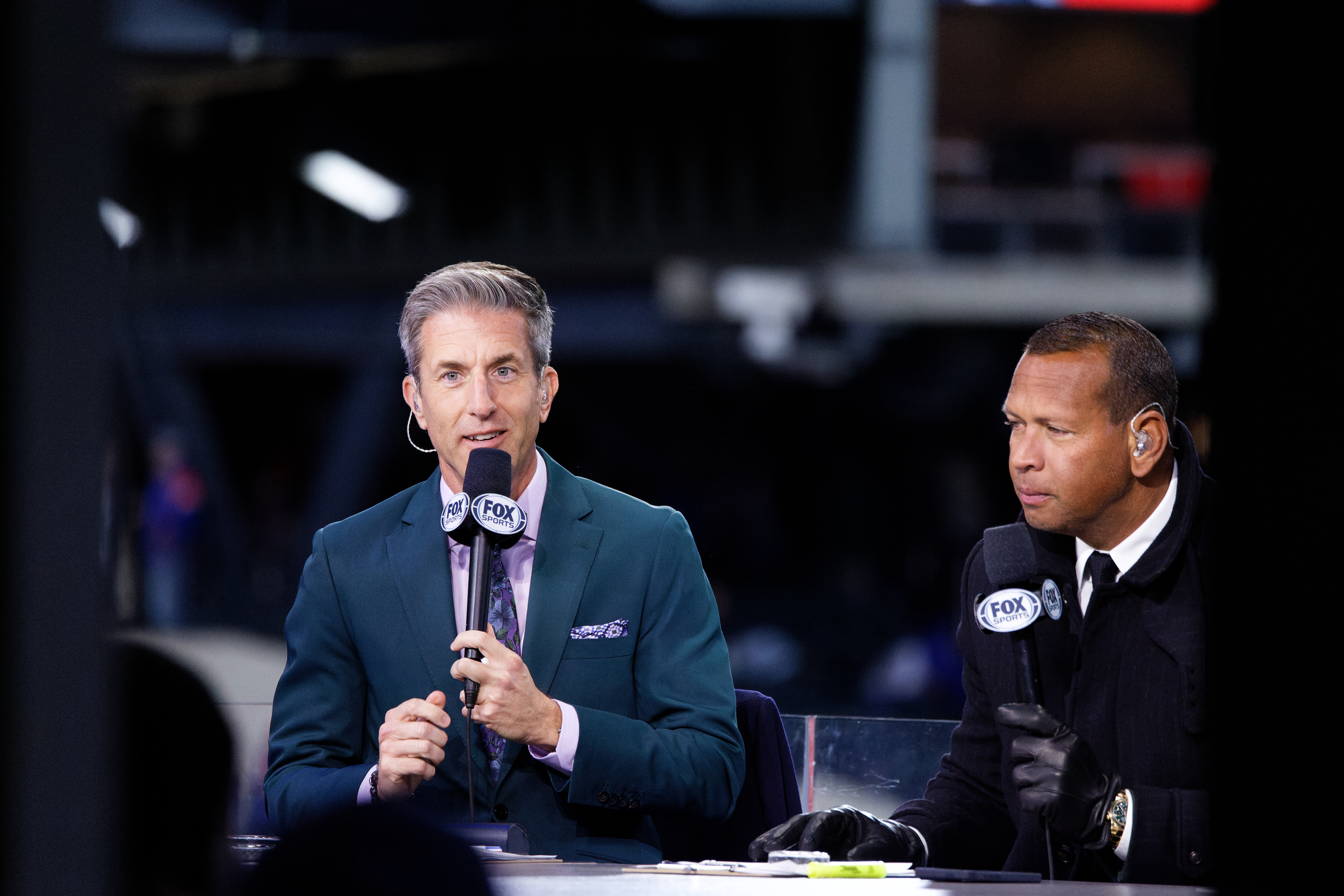
Kevin Burkhardt and Rodriguez during MLB on Fox pre-game show in 2024

Rodriguez is an MLB studio analyst for Fox Sports, working alongside Kevin Burkhardt, David Ortiz and Derek Jeter. During his tenure as analyst, Fox Sports' MLB studio show won back-to-back Sports Emmy Awards for Outstanding Studio Show during the network's coverage of the 2016 and 2017 postseason. Rodriguez was nominated for an Emmy for Outstanding Sports Personality, Studio and Sports Event Analyst in 2019. Rodriguez joined ESPN in 2018 as a Sunday Night Baseball analyst, alongside Matt Vasgersian and Buster Olney. In the 2022 season, Rodriguez moved to a simulcast on ESPN2 that he co-hosts with Michael Kay.

In January 2017, CNBC announced Rodriguez would be the host of the show Back in the Game. The first episode debuted on the network in March 2018. The series focuses on Rodriguez mentoring athletes and entertainers who have fallen on hard times. A four-episode series debuted in November 2019 and featured Evander Holyfield, Ryan Lochte, Brian Dunkleman, and Nicole Eggert.

In July 2020, it was announced that Rodriguez would be part of the judging panel for the Forbes Next 1000 list, a franchise which focuses on entrepreneurs from marginalized communities.

Rodriguez appeared in The Captain, a 2022 miniseries about Jeter's life and career. Rodriguez and Jeter discussed the rift in their friendship.

Rodriguez is the subject of the 2025 documentary series Alex vs ARod.

=== Advertisements ===
Rodriguez was featured in a 2010 Pepsi Cola commercial as a truck driver in a fleet of delivery trucks simulating players in a baseball game. At the end of the commercial when he drives his vehicle to make a catch, he is told by his approving partner in the truck that he has a future in the beverage delivery business.

Rodriguez is featured in a commercial for Guitar Hero World Tour, where he plays the guitar along with athletes Tony Hawk on drums, Kobe Bryant on vocals, and Michael Phelps on guitar. The commercial is a spoof of the scene from Risky Business where Tom Cruise is dancing to "Old Time Rock and Roll".

In 2019, Rodriguez was featured in a Planters Super Bowl commercial, where he is watching the game and about to snack on some kale chips but Mr. Peanut drives in to stop him from eating kale and instead snack on some Peanuts. In 2020, during Super Bowl LIV, Rodriguez was featured in a Presidente beer Super Bowl commercial, as well as a Hard Rock ad which also featured Jennifer Lopez.

In 2021, Rodriguez teamed up with cosmetics company Hims to launch a line of make-up for men, beginning with its first product – a concealer stick. His ex Jennifer Lopez is a co-investor. In 2022, Rodriguez appeared in a DirecTV commercial with Ortiz and former Mariners teammates Griffey Jr. and Johnson.

== Criticism ==
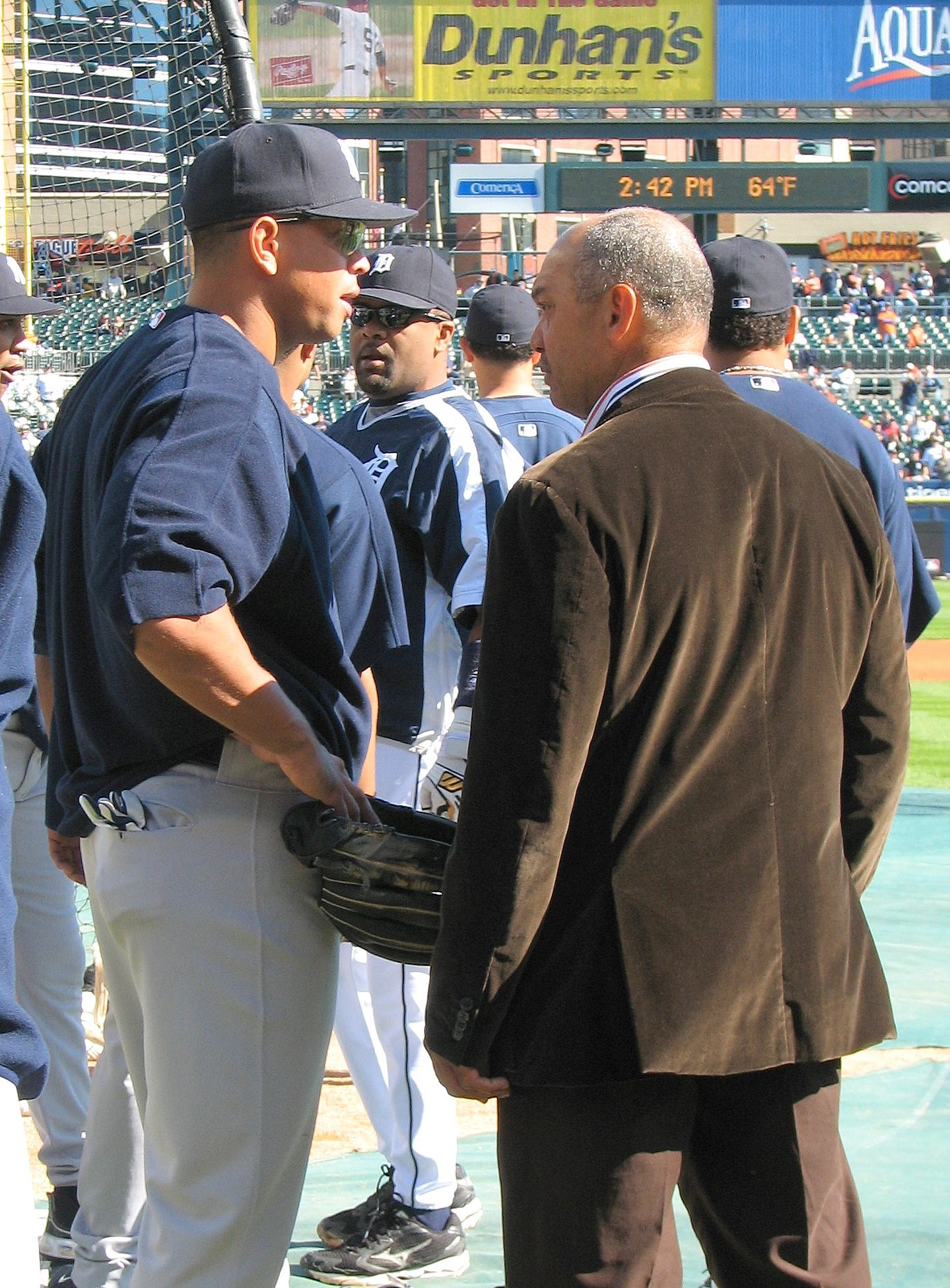
Reggie Jackson talking with Rodriguez during batting practice

Due to the unsuccessful nature of the Yankees postseasons from 2004 to 2007, along with Rodriguez's sub-.200 batting average in the postseasons of 2005 and 2006, Rodriguez drew criticism in the New York area, both from writers, such as the New York Post's Joel Sherman, and players, such as then-teammate, Jason Giambi. Prior to 2009, Rodriguez had received the nickname "The Cooler" among some players because of the perceived tendency for teams to turn cold when he joins them and hot when he leaves. According to Yankees manager Joe Torre's 2009 book, The Yankee Years, Rodriguez earned the nickname "A-Fraud" from teammates and particularly from clubhouse attendants who were said to resent his demands. "It was [said] in front of him," Torre later said of the nickname. "A lot of that stuff that went on in the clubhouse was more tongue-in-cheek, fun type stuff," he explained.

Much of the criticism regarding Rodriguez focused on his alleged inability to produce hits in clutch situations. In 2008, Rodriguez hit only .264 with runners in scoring position and two outs. In 95 plate appearances, he walked 20 times and was hit by three pitches, and he had only 19 hits. Of the 41 times Rodriguez struck out with two outs, 20 came with runners in scoring position.

Because of the Yankees' successful history, he was compared unfavorably to other Yankees greats who have performed exceptionally well in the postseason, such as Reggie Jackson. However, after his performance in the 2009 postseason, Rodriguez started receiving many positive comparisons to Reggie Jackson, even being selected as "Mr. October" by Jackson and USA Today.

Rodriguez answered many of the criticisms of his postseason performance by performing exceptionally well in the 2009 postseason, where he posted a .365 batting average and hit six home-runs in 52 at-bats during the Yankees' 15 post-season games.

== Use of performance-enhancing drugs ==
In July 2007, former outfielder Jose Canseco, who admitted to steroid-use whilst playing said that he was planning to publish another book about Major League Baseball (MLB) to follow his 2005 bestseller Juiced. Canseco said his new book would have "other stuff" on Rodriguez, and called him a hypocrite. At the time, Rodriguez denied accusations of steroid use. In a 2007 interview with Katie Couric, Rodriguez flatly denied ever having used performance-enhancing drugs.

In February 2009, Selena Roberts and David Epstein of Sports Illustrated reported that Rodriguez had tested positive for two anabolic steroids, testosterone and Primobolan, during his 2003 season playing for the Texas Rangers, the same season in which he captured his first American League Most Valuable Player award, broke 300 career home runs (hitting 47 that year), and earned one of his ten Silver Slugger Awards. The information had been part of a government-sealed report detailing 104 major league players (out of 1200 players tested) who tested positive for performance enhancers during a 2003 drug survey. Approved by the players themselves with the promise of anonymity, the survey was conducted by MLB to see whether a mandatory drug testing program might be necessary. At the time, as the result of a collectively bargained union agreement, there was no penalty or punishment for a positive test. Because more than 5% of the samples taken from players in 2003 came back positive, mandatory testing of major league baseball players began in 2004, with penalties for violations.

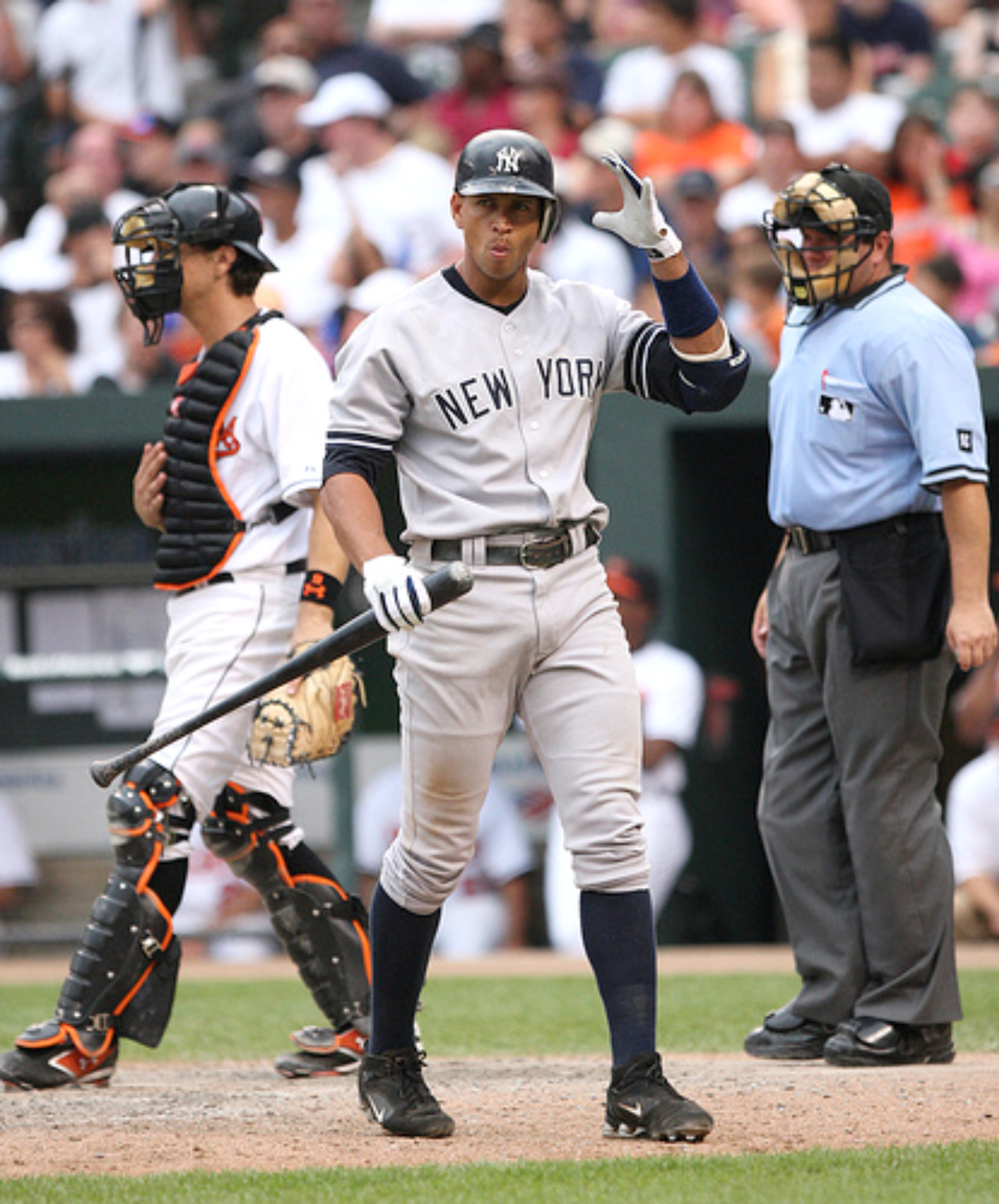
Rodriguez batting in 2007

The 2003 test results were supposed to remain anonymous and the samples destroyed. However, a coded master list of 104 players was seized during the BALCO investigation, turning up in a 2004 federal raid on Comprehensive Drug Testing's facility in Long Beach, California. A month later, the physical samples were seized by federal agents raiding Quest Diagnostics in Las Vegas. The list of the 104 positive-testing players was released to the MLB Players Association (MLBPA) in 2004. The players' union later said that the 104 positive samples were in the process of being destroyed when they were subpoenaed by federal authorities in November 2003, making continued destruction "improper."

Although testosterone is available by prescription for some uses, Primobolan has no approved prescription use. Also known as methenolone or metenolone enanthate, it is the same steroid that Barry Bonds is alleged to have tested positive for in 2000 and 2001. A fairly weak steroid on its own, it is generally used in conjunction with other steroids. The drug is generally preferred in injected rather than oral form due to its cost. An official statement by MLB made shortly after Rodriguez's test results became public expressed "grave concern" without naming Rodriguez, noting that "because the survey testing that took place in 2003 was intended to be non-disciplinary and anonymous, we can not make any comment on the accuracy of this report as it pertains to the player named."

In an interview with ESPN after the report came out, citing "an enormous amount of pressure to perform", Rodriguez admitted to using banned substances from 2001 to 2003. "All my years in New York have been clean", he added, saying he had not used banned substances since last taking them following a spring training injury in 2003 while playing for the Rangers. "Back then, [baseball] was a different culture", Rodriguez said. "It was very loose. I was young, I was stupid, I was naïve. And I wanted to prove to everyone that I was worth being one of the greatest players of all time. I did take a banned substance. And for that, I am very sorry and deeply regretful." Rodriguez said he could not be sure of the name(s) of the substance(s) he had used.

Rodriguez said he was never told that he was among the 104 players who tested positive, only that a tip came in August 2004 from Gene Orza of the MLBPA that he "may or may not have" failed his 2003 test. Orza was accused by three (unnamed) MLB players of tipping Rodriguez to an upcoming drug test in September 2004; both Orza and the MLBPA have denied the allegations.

Rodriguez absolved the players' union of any blame for leaking his positive test results, saying he alone was responsible for his mistakes. Friend and former teammate Doug Glanville, while noting the outrage over Rodriguez's years of steroid use, berated Rodriguez's critics for their "lack of outrage about how a confidential and anonymous test could be made public." No major league player, Glanville wrote, would have participated in the 2003 survey if he had thought the results had even a chance of becoming public. "It has everything to do with privacy. Being A-Rod should not change that fact."

MLB commissioner Bud Selig briefly considered whether to punish Rodriguez for his admitted steroid use, citing the illegality of the situation, among other things. However, at the time of the testing there were no punishments for this sort of activity. Additionally, his admission to three years of steroid use could be damaging to his image and legacy.

Later in the month, Rodriguez called a press conference in Tampa, and in the presence of many supportive Yankee teammates, answered reporters' questions about his 2001–2003 steroid use. Rodriguez said he and a cousin (whom he refused to name) bought an unidentified drug over-the-counter in the Dominican Republic, where it is "known on the streets as boli or bollee." At Rodriguez's instruction, the cousin transported the drug into the United States. For six months of the year, Rodriguez injected himself twice monthly with "boli" (a drug name unfamiliar to experts and perhaps a slang term for Primobolan or Dianabol, although the latter steroid is taken orally). Rodriguez said he did not know whether he was using the drug properly or whether it was safe. Although he "certainly felt more energy", Rodriguez said it would be "hard to say" whether it gave him a competitive edge.

Rodriguez said he would become a spokesperson for the Taylor Hooton foundation, which educates young people about the dangers of steroid use. He has since spoken at schools about the dangers of steroids.

On February 28, 2010, The New York Times reported that Rodriguez had received treatment from Canadian sports doctor Anthony Galea in March 2009. In 2011, Galea reached a plea agreement for bringing unapproved and mislabeled drugs into the United States, including human growth hormone (HGH) and Actovegin. Galea confirmed to the Associated Press that he had treated Rodriguez but claimed that he had only prescribed anti-inflammatories.

=== Biogenesis scandal ===
Between 2010 and 2012, Rodriguez reportedly received HGH from Biogenesis of America, an anti-aging clinic in Coral Gables, run by Bosch. For much of the summer of 2013, it had been expected that Rodriguez would be suspended for his role in the scandal. The first definitive confirmation came on August 3, 2013, when MLB rebuffed the players' union's last-minute offer to negotiate. Instead, it allowed Rodriguez until the afternoon of August 4 to reach an agreement regarding a suspension or greater punishment for his role in the Biogenesis affair.

On August 5, MLB suspended Rodriguez from August 8 through the end of the 2014 season for violating the league's PED policy, a term that was to include a total of 211 regular-season games plus any postseason games. He was one of 13 players suspended for their roles in the scandal. In its official statement, MLB announced that the suspension was based on Rodriguez's "use and possession of numerous forms of prohibited performance-enhancing substances, including Testosterone and human Growth Hormone, over the course of multiple years" and "for attempting to cover-up his violations of the Program by engaging in a course of conduct intended to obstruct and frustrate the Office of the Commissioner's investigation." Although the standard punishment for a first offense under MLB's drug policy is 50 games, MLB had the option of suspending Rodriguez for a longer term under the collective bargaining agreement if it had determined that his actions constituted conduct detrimental to baseball.

Almost immediately after the suspension was announced, Rodriguez announced that he would appeal. He was the only player to do so; the others accepted season-ending 50-game suspensions without appeal. Although MLB commissioner Bud Selig had the option of using his best-interests-of-baseball powers to remove Rodriguez from the field immediately, he chose to suspend Rodriguez under the drug agreement and not the CBA, allowing Rodriguez to continue playing while the appeal was under way. The proposed suspension would include a global lock clause, which would also prevent him from playing in other known leagues, such as Nippon Professional Baseball and the Korea Baseball Championship, as the leagues in those nations honor any suspensions imposed by MLB. Rodriguez hired New York criminal defense lawyer Joe Tacopina.

A lengthy arbitration process followed, but the suspension was upheld on January 11, 2014. However, because Rodriguez was allowed to play during the appeal process, this effectively reduced the suspension to 162 games, the entirety of the 2014 regular-season schedule. Because Rodriguez was on the suspended list retroactive through August 31, the suspension would have included the postseason if the Yankees had qualified, although the team failed to reach the playoffs. Rodriguez issued a statement announcing that he would challenge the decision in federal court. On February 7, 2014, Rodriguez announced his decision to abandon his lawsuit and accept the suspension for the 2014 season. In March 2014, multiple sources reported that Rodriguez had refused to pay the balance of his legal fees, which amounted to more than $3 million. In July 2014, Rodriguez was sued by his lawyers for $380,000 in unpaid legal fees.

In November 2014, it was revealed that in the previous January, Rodriguez had admitted to the Drug Enforcement Administration that he had used performance-enhancing drugs. This was contrary to his comments of 18 days earlier when he had vehemently refuted the allegations and denied having used human growth hormones.

== A-Rod Corp ==
Rodriguez founded A-Rod Corp, a holding company, in 1996 and the company began making its first investments in 2003. Through the company, Rodriguez has invested in a series of companies in the technology, real estate, wellness, and entertainment industries. In 2008, Rodriguez founded Newport Property Construction, a real-estate development firm.

In 2012, he founded Monument Capital Management, which has acquired more than $1 billion of real estate assets in 16 states.

=== Investments ===
A-Rod Corp has invested in various companies including coconut water brand Vita Coco, Wheels Up, Snapchat, and virtual concert startup Wave.

Rodriguez partnered with Mark Mastrov in 2012 to create the Energy Fitness gym chain in Mexico City. Rodriguez sold a Mercedes-Benz dealership in League City, Texas, to Group 1 Automotive in 2014.

Rodriguez invested in NRG Esports alongside Shaquille O'Neal and Jimmy Rollins in 2016. In 2017, A-Rod Corp gained the rights to develop UFC-branded fitness centers across southern Florida. That year, A-Rod Corp purchased a major equity stake in TruFusion, a Las Vegas-based fitness studio chain, and invested in the beverage brand Dirty Lemon.

In 2018, A-Rod Corp invested in Petros Pace Finance, a financier of green development.

In 2019, the company invested in the co-living startup Bungalow, Acorns and Sonder. That year, Rodriguez and Jennifer Lopez partnered with telehealth company Hims and Hers to provide affordable healthcare. Rodriguez also invested in Density, a technology company specializing in people counting.

Rodriguez became the new chairman of Presidente, a Dominican beer company owned by Anheuser-Busch InBev, in January 2020. A-Rod Corp invested in Nova Credit, a financial technology company, in February 2020.

In July 2020, Rodriguez and Lopez were leading a group of investors bidding on the New York Mets, and had moved to the second stage of the bidding process. The bid failed, however.

Rodriguez and Marc Lore agreed to purchase the Minnesota Timberwolves of the National Basketball Association in 2021. Then-owner Glen Taylor said in 2024 that Rodriguez and Lore missed a payment to purchase the team, which was no longer for sale. Rodriguez and Lore won an arbitration ruling in 2025 to allow them to purchase the team from Taylor. The purchase, valuing the team at $1.5 billion, was completed in June 2025.

=== The Corp Podcast ===
Rodriguez partnered with Barstool Sports in 2018 to co-create The Corp Podcast with Dan Katz aka Barstool Big Cat. The podcast interviews industry leaders, athletes, and entrepreneurs. Season 1 featured Kobe Bryant, Gary Vaynerchuk, Barbara Corcoran, Mike Francesa, Michael Rubin and Barry Sternlicht. Season 2 featured Kevin Bacon, Martha Stewart, Danica Patrick, Stephanie McMahon, Maria Bartiromo, and Howard Schultz.

== Personal life ==
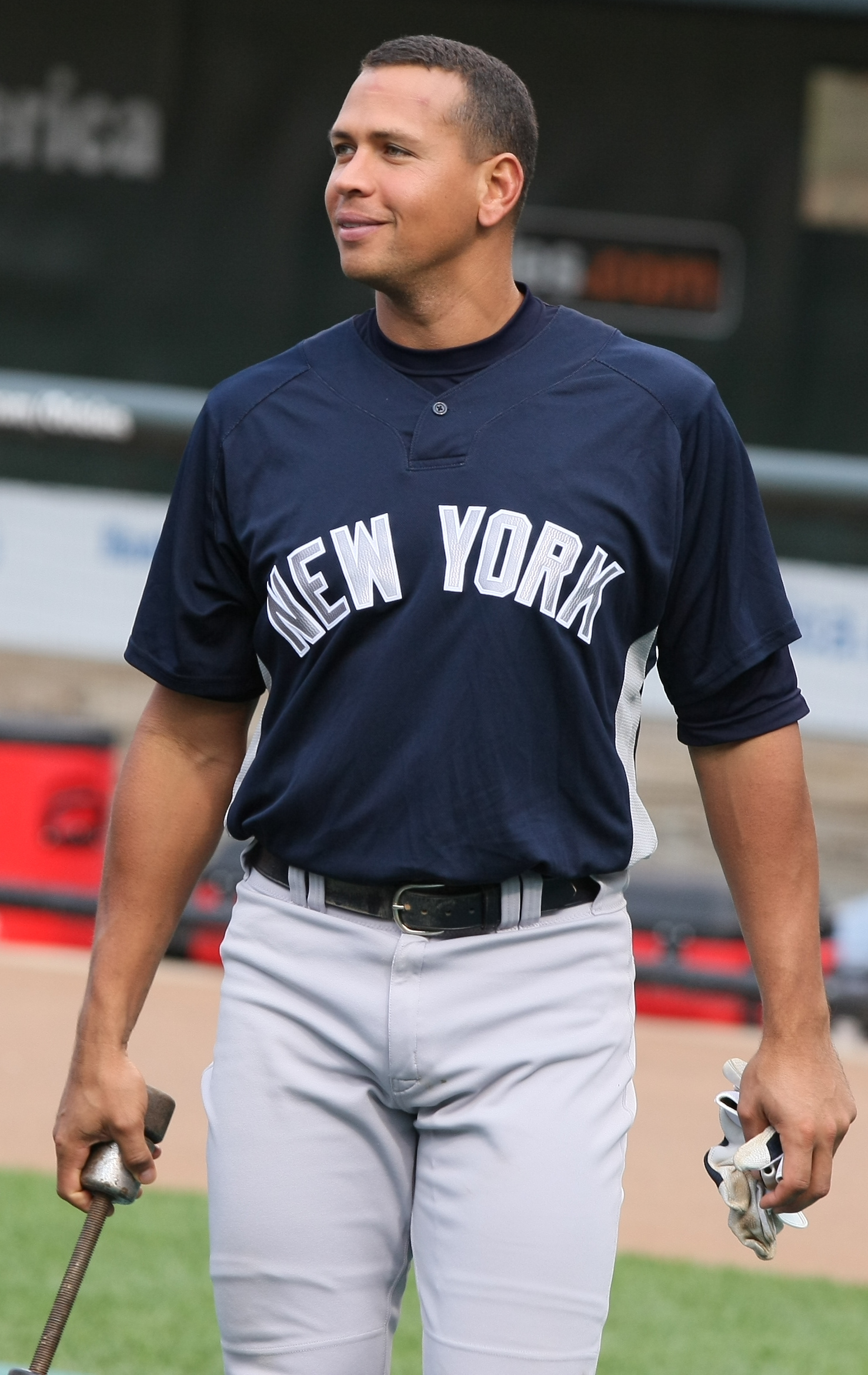
Rodriguez at batting practice in August 2009

Rodriguez grew up with two half-siblings, Joe and Suzy, who were born in the Dominican Republic and are children from his mother's first marriage. Rodriguez's father, Victor, left the family in Miami when Alex was nine years old and moved to New York. The next time that Alex heard from him, was the day of the 1993 MLB draft. They met again in 2000.

Rodriguez also has a half-brother, Victor M. Rodriguez, who was born to Alex's father Victor Sr. and his then-wife Pouppe Martinez in 1960. The couple divorced a year later, and Victor Jr. grew up with his mother. Victor Jr., who is an officer in the United States Air Force, fell out of touch with Alex for 23 years, until they met at a Texas Rangers game in 2003. Rodriguez 's nephew, Joe Dunand, was a professional baseball player.

In 2002, Rodriguez and Cynthia Scurtis, a psychology graduate he had met at a gym in Miami, married. Their first child was born on November 18, 2004. On April 21, 2008, Cynthia gave birth to their second child in Miami.

Cynthia Rodriguez filed for divorce on July 7, 2008, citing "emotional abandonment" of her and their children, "extramarital affairs and other marital misconduct" by her husband. Rodriguez responded in court documents that the marriage was "irretrievably broken" but requested that allegations of his "extramarital affairs" be stricken from court records. The couple reached a settlement that September. In July, Madonna responded to rumors of an affair with Rodriguez releasing a statement saying, "I am not romantically involved in any way with Alex Rodriguez" and that she had "nothing to do with the state of his marriage". Rodriguez dated Kate Hudson before having a relationship with Cameron Diaz from May 2010 to September 2011. He dated model, actress, and former WWE Diva Torrie Wilson from 2011 to 2014. Then, he was in a short relationship with Anne Wojcicki, the founder of 23andMe, which ended in 2016 after dating for nearly a year.

In February 2017, he and singer and actress Jennifer Lopez began dating. In March 2019, they announced their engagement. In a 2020 interview with Devin Banerjee, Rodriguez described Lopez as "a powerhouse" saying, "I've never met anyone who has the work ethic, the vision, the principles that Jennifer possesses. She does so many things that people call her a triple threat. I call her an octopus threat." In April 2021, he and Lopez announced the end of their engagement.

In 2011, Rodriguez was represented by sports agent Dan Lozano. As of 2019, he is represented by Jon Rosen of WME/IMG.

== Philanthropy ==
In 2003, Rodriguez gave $3.9 million to the University of Miami to renovate its baseball stadium. The new facility was renamed "Alex Rodriguez Park at Mark Light Field". He is an ardent Miami Hurricanes fan. Despite not having attended the school, he received the university's Edward T. Foote II Alumnus of Distinction Award in 2007 as an honorary alumnus. Rodriguez was named an "honorary alumnus" of the university in 2004. He is a member of the university's board of trustees. In 2017, Rodriguez and A-Rod Corp donated $500,000 to the university's School of Business Administration.

Rodriguez is a Miami-Dade Boys & Girls Clubs Board Member. Rodriguez and A-Rod Corp donated $1 million to Boy & Girls Clubs of Miami-Dade in 2010, building a state-of-the-art educational center for students. He donated an additional $1 million to Boys & Girls Club in conjunction with MLB. In addition, Rodriguez created a scholarship program for Boys and Girls Club alumni to attend the University of Miami, sponsoring more than 25 students since inception of the program.

In October 2019, Rodriguez, along with Jennifer Lopez, donated a year of prepared meals to Tennessee elementary students. In April 2020, Rodriguez and Lopez donated 20,000 prepared meals to help hospitality workers in the Miami area who had lost their jobs during the COVID-19 pandemic. He is also a member of the Paley Center for Media's board of trustees.

== Awards and honors ==
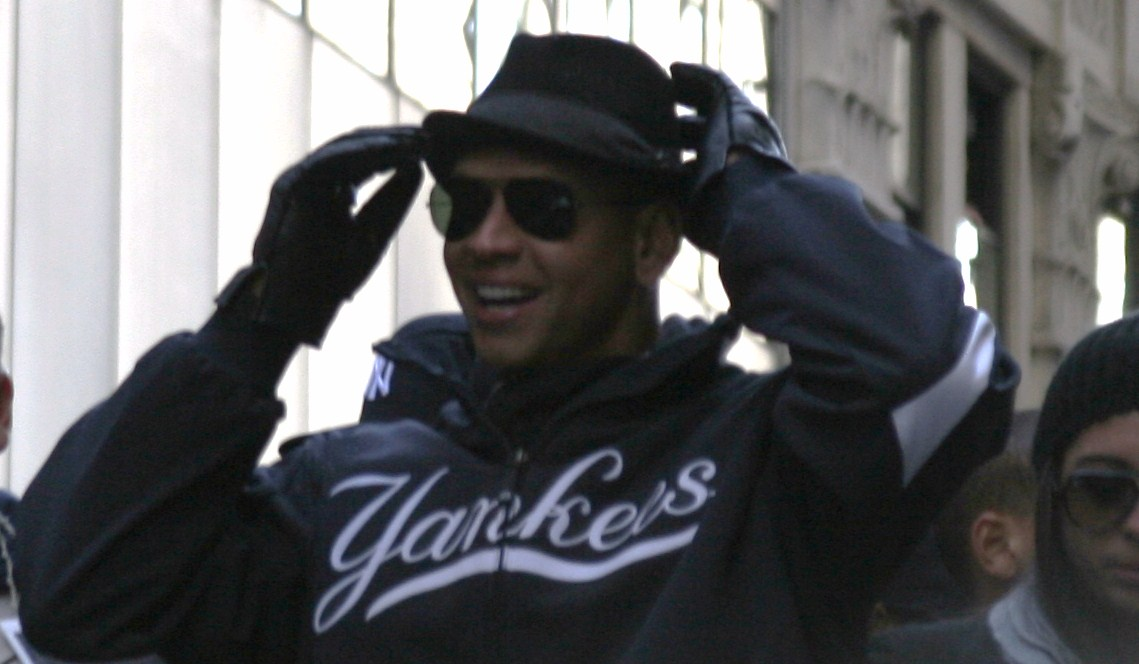
Alex Rodriguez during the 2009 World Series parade.

Championships earned or shared
Title	Times	Dates	Ref
American League (AL) batting champion	1	1996	
AL champion	1	2009	
World Series champion	1	2009	

Rodriguez was included on the ballot for the National Baseball Hall of Fame class of 2022 when it was announced on November 22, 2021. In his first three years of eligibility, his highest vote total is 35.7%. The threshold for election is 75%.

Major league, minor league, and high school awards and exhibition team selections

- 1st Team High School All-American at infield (1993)
- 14× American League (AL) All-Star
  - 7× as shortstop (1996–98, 2000–03)
  - 7× as third baseman (2004–08, 2010–11)
- 3× AL Most Valuable Player Award (2003, 2005, 2007)
- Babe Ruth Award (2009)
- 3× Babe Ruth Home Run Award (2002, 2003, 2007)
- Baseball America 1st-Team Minor League All-Star at shortstop (1995)
- 4× Baseball America 1st-Team Major League All-Star
  - 3× at shortstop (1998, 2000–03)
  - at third base (2005)
- 2× Baseball America Major League Player of the Year (2000, 2002)
- Gatorade National Baseball Player of the Year (1993)
- GIBBY/This Year in Baseball Awards for Hitter of the Year (2007)
- GIBBY/This Year in Baseball Awards for Individual Performance of the Year (2005)
- 6× GIBBY/This Year in Baseball Awards for Outstanding Player of the Year (1996, 1998, 2001–03, 2007)
- 4× Hank Aaron Award (2001–03, 2007)
- 10× Major League Baseball (MLB) Player of the Month Award
- 13× MLB Player of the Week Award
- 2× Minor League Baseball All-Star (1994 Midwest League, 1995 Triple-A)
- Pepsi Clutch Performer of the Year (2007)
- 2× Gold Glove Award at shortstop (2002, 2003)
- Seattle Mariners Minor League Player of the Year (1994)
- 2× Mariners Player of the Year (1998, 2000)
- 10× Silver Slugger Award
  - 7× at shortstop (1996, 1998–2003)
  - 3× at third base (2005, 2007, 2008)
- 3× The Sporting News Player of the Year (1996, 2002, 2007)
- 3× Texas Rangers Player of the Year (2001–03)
- World Baseball Classic participant for United States (2006)

== Achievements ==
Notes: Per Baseball-Reference.com.

American League statistical leader
Category	Times	Seasons
Batting champion	1	1996
Doubles leader	1	1996
Extra base hits leader	1	2001
Hits leader	1	1998
Home run leader	5	2001–03, 2005, 2007
On-base plus slugging leader	2	2005, 2007
Runs batted in leader	2	2002, 2007
Runs scored leader	5	1996, 2001, 2003, 2005, 2007
Slugging percentage leader	4	2003, 2005, 2007, 2008
Total bases leader	4	1996, 2001, 2002, 2007

== Records ==
Major league records
Record	Total	Season(s)
Most career home runs by a New York-born player	696	1995–2016
Most career grand slams	25	1996–2015
Most runs in a season (SS)	141	1996
Most extra base hits in a season (SS)	91	1996
Highest slugging percentage in a season (SS)	.631	1996
Most total bases in a season (SS)	393	2001
Most home runs in a season (SS)	57	2002
Most home runs in the month of April (tied)	14	2007
Fewest games to hit 12 home runs to start a season (tied)	15	2007
Fewest games to hit 13 and 14 home runs to start a season	18	2007
Youngest ever to hit 500 home runs	age 32 years and 8 days	2007
Most home runs by a third baseman (season)	52^{†}	2007

^{†}: Rodriguez hit 2 home runs as a DH in 2007.

American League records
Record	Total	Season(s)
Most home runs in the month of April	14	2007
Fewest games to hit 10 home runs to start a season	14	2007
Fewest games to hit 12 home runs to start a season	15	2007

New York Yankees Records
Record	Total	Season(s)
Most RBIs in a postseason	18	2009

== See also ==
- 30–30 club
- 50 home run club
- List of highest paid Major League Baseball players
- Major League Baseball titles leaders

Awards and achievements
Preceded by Juan González; Paul Konerko; Magglio Ordóñez; Brian Roberts; Jason Giambi; Jason Giambi; Robinson Canó; Justin Morneau	American League Player of the Month; August 1996; July & August 2002; August 2003; May 2005; August 2005; May 2006; April 2007; June 2007	Succeeded by Frank Thomas; Manny Ramirez; Alfonso Soriano; Travis Hafner; David Ortiz; Joe Mauer; Justin Morneau; Hideki Matsui
Preceded by Albert Belle; Barry Bonds	The Sporting News Player of the Year; 1996; 2002	Succeeded by Ken Griffey Jr. Albert Pujols
Preceded by Albert Belle; Barry Bonds; Ryan Howard	Players Choice Player of the Year; 1996; 2002; 2007	Succeeded by Mark McGwire; Albert Pujols; Albert Pujols
Preceded by first	Pepsi MLB Clutch Performer of the Year; 2007	Succeeded by CC Sabathia
Preceded by Alex Ochoa	Hitting for the cycle June 5, 1997	Succeeded by John Olerud
