= Santana Moss =

American football player (born 1979)

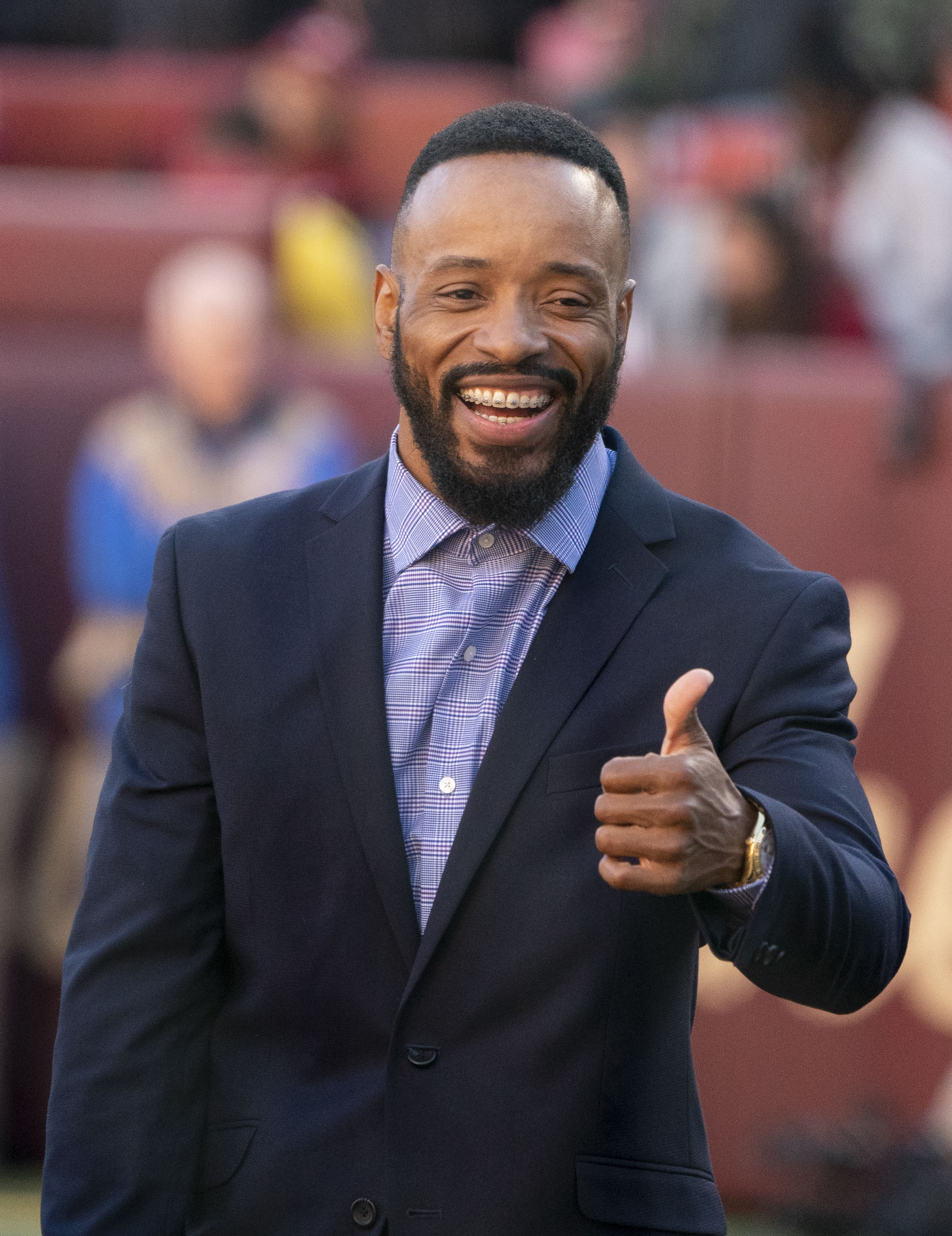
- Moss in 2018

No. 83, 89
- Positions: Wide receiver, punt returner

Personal information
- Born: June 1, 1979 (age 47); Miami, Florida, U.S.
- Listed height: 5 ft 10 in (1.78 m)
- Listed weight: 193 lb (88 kg)

Career information
- High school: Miami Carol City (Miami Gardens, Florida)
- College: Miami (FL) (1997–2000)
- NFL draft: 2001: 1st round, 16th overall pick

Career history
- New York Jets (2001–2004); Washington Redskins (2005–2014)

Awards and highlights
- Second-team All-Pro (2005); Pro Bowl (2005); Washington Commanders 90 Greatest; Washington Commanders Ring of Fame; Paul Warfield Trophy (2000); Consensus All-American (2000); Big East Offensive Player of the Year (2000); Big East Special Teams Player of the Year (2000); First-team All-Big East (2000)

Career NFL statistics
- Receptions: 733
- Receiving yards: 10,283
- Receiving touchdowns: 66
- Return yards: 1,451
- Return touchdowns: 3
- Stats at Pro Football Reference

Santana Terrell Moss (born June 1, 1979) is an American former professional football player who was a wide receiver for 14 seasons in the National Football League (NFL). He played college football for the Miami Hurricanes, earning consensus All-American honors. Moss was selected by the New York Jets in the first round of the 2001 NFL draft, where he spent four seasons with the team, before playing for the Washington Redskins for 10 seasons. Moss was selected as an All-Pro in 2005.

== Early life ==
Moss was born in Miami, Florida. He attended Miami Carol City Senior High, and played high school football for the Carol City Chiefs. He led the team with 25 receptions for 600 yards and 12 touchdowns as a senior and amassed 450 yards on 12 kickoff returns with one return touchdown that year. Moss earned third-team all-state football honors following his senior season.

== College career ==
Moss attended the University of Miami, and joined the Miami Hurricanes in 1997 as a walk-on, before being awarded a scholarship after the season's third game. He went on to break the Hurricanes' record (previously held by Michael Irvin) for most receiving yards (with 2,546 yards). He finished his 2000 senior season with 1,604 all-purpose yards, received first-team All-Big East Conference honors, and was recognized a consensus first-team All-American. Moss also became the first player to earn Big East Offensive Player of the Year and Special Teams Player of the Year honors in the same season.

Moss is an important figure in Miami Hurricanes football history, generally considered (along with Irvin) to be one of the most accomplished wide receivers in the university's history. He graduated as the school's all-time leader in receiving yards (2,546), punt return yards (1,196), and all-purpose yards (4,394). Moss was interviewed about his time at the University of Miami for the documentary The U, which premiered December 12, 2009, on ESPN. He was inducted into the University of Miami Sports Hall of Fame in 2011.

=== Track and field ===
Moss was also a standout track athlete for the Miami Carol City Senior High track team. He was a two-time state champion in the triple jump and won state title in the long jump during junior season. He set a school record in the triple jump with leap of 14.81 meters.

He also ran track for the Miami Hurricanes track and field team, and was named the "Most Outstanding Field Performer" for the 2000 Big East Outdoor Track and Field championships. He won the triple jump at the 2000 Big East Championships, with a personal-best mark of 15.50 meters.

Personal bests

Event	Time (seconds)	Venue	Date
60 meters	6.72	South Bend, Indiana	February 4, 2000
100 meters	10.70	Villanova, Pennsylvania	May 2, 1999

Event	Mark (meters)	Venue	Date
Long Jump	7.98	Piscataway, New Jersey	May 6, 2000
Triple jump	15.50	Piscataway, New Jersey	May 7, 2000

== Professional career ==
Pre-draft measurables
Height	Weight	Arm length	Hand span	40-yard dash	Vertical jump
5 ft 9 5/8 in (1.77 m)	184 lb (83 kg)	29 in (0.74 m)	8 1/2 in (0.22 m)	4.31 s	42.0 in (1.07 m)
All values from NFL Combine

=== New York Jets ===
==== 2001–2004 ====
Moss was a first round (16th overall) pick in the 2001 NFL draft by the New York Jets out of the University of Miami. In the 2001 season, he made his NFL debut in Week 10 against the Miami Dolphins. Moss made his first career catch in Week 12 against the New England Patriots.

In the 2002 season, Moss made his first career start in Week 1 against the Buffalo Bills.

Moss played a total of 51 games with the New York Jets and finished with 2,416 receiving yards, 19 touchdowns, 127 rushing yards, and 1,799 return yards.

=== Washington Redskins ===
==== 2005 season ====
Following the 2004 season, Moss was acquired by the Washington Redskins in a trade with the New York Jets for Laveranues Coles. Moss signed a six-year contract with the Redskins on May 4, 2005.

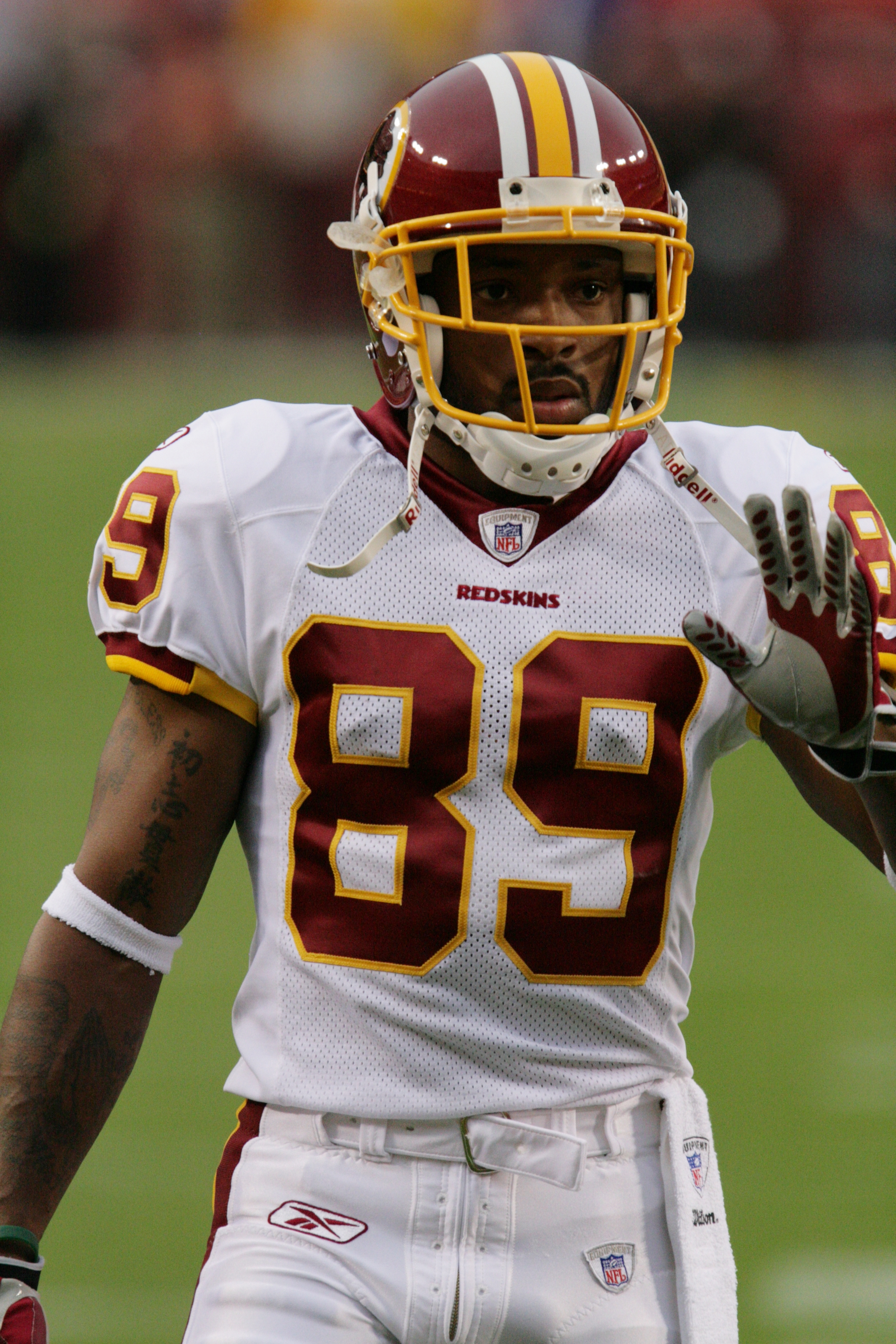
Moss with the Washington Redskins, 2006

Known for his big play potential, Moss started the 2005 season off with a bang in Week 2 against the Dallas Cowboys, where he caught two touchdown passes of 39 and 70 yards from Mark Brunell in the last five minutes to come from behind and beat the Cowboys 14–13.

His 2005 season with the Redskins was the best in his professional career, with 84 receptions for 1,483 yards (second highest in the NFL that year, behind only Steve Smith of the Carolina Panthers), setting a new Redskins single-season receiving record, and nine touchdowns. In 2005, Moss also was selected to his first and only NFL Pro Bowl. Moss recorded 18 rushing yards and 3 catches for 39 receiving yards at the Pro Bowl.

==== 2006 season ====
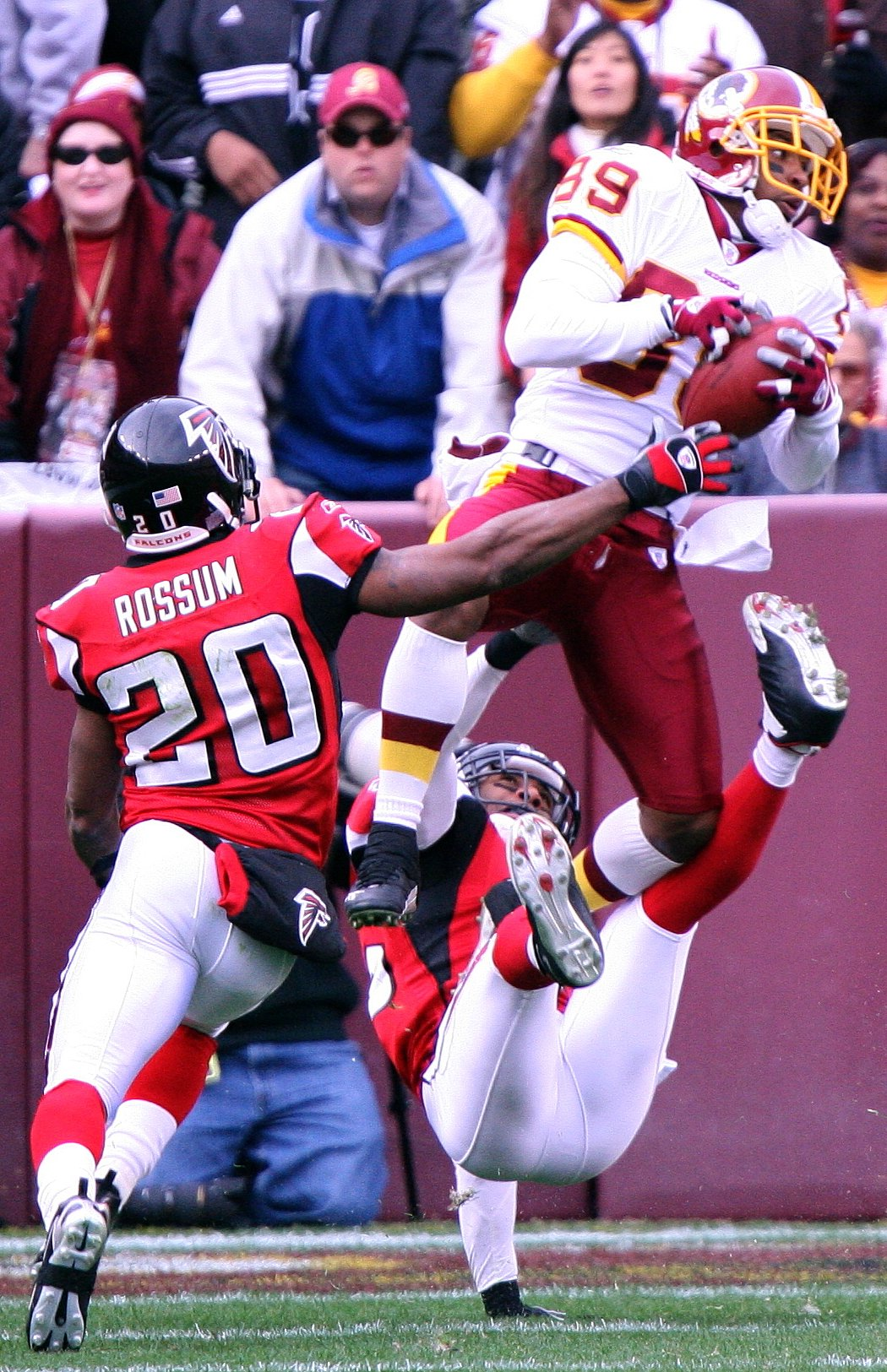
Moss makes a mid-air catch in a 2006 game against the Atlanta Falcons with Allen Rossum in pursuit

In the first three games of the 2006 season, he recorded 13 catches for 188 yards. On October 1, 2006, Moss exploded for a season-high 138 yards on 4 catches, hauling in two touchdowns of 55 and 8 yards, as well as a 68-yard game-winning touchdown to give Washington the victory in overtime over the visiting Jacksonville Jaguars 36–30. Due to injuries that kept him inactive much of the year and less than 100% when he did play, Moss finished the 2006 season with 790 yards and 6 touchdowns on 55 receptions.

==== 2007 season ====
In the 2007 season, Moss started and played in 14 games and recorded 61 receptions, 808 receiving yards, and three touchdowns.

==== 2008 season ====
In the 2008 season, Moss recorded over 1,000 receiving yards for the third time in his career.

==== 2009 season ====
Starting in all 16 games in 2009, Moss recorded 70 receptions, 902 receiving yards, and three touchdowns.

==== 2010 season ====
In the 2010 season, the last season of his contract with the Redskins, Moss recorded 1,115 receiving yards making this the fourth time in his career that he recorded over 1,000 receiving yards. He achieved a new career high of 93 receptions to go along with six touchdowns in the 2010 season.

==== 2011 season ====
With his original contract ending, Moss re-signed with the Redskins. On July 26, the Redskins signed him to a three-year, $15 million contract that included a $5 million signing bonus. He was made offensive co-captain along with Trent Williams. In Week 7 against the Carolina Panthers, Moss suffered a broken left hand. He made his return to the field in Week 12 against the Seattle Seahawks. In Week 14 against the New England Patriots, Moss caught a 49-yard touchdown pass from wide receiver Brandon Banks, the first passing touchdown of Banks' career. Working mostly out of the slot receiver position, Moss played and started 12 games and recorded 46 receptions, 584 receiving yards, and four touchdowns in the 2011 season.

==== 2012 season ====
During the preseason, it was reported that Moss lost 15 pounds to prepare for the 2012 season. After seven consecutive seasons of being a starter for the Redskins, his responsibility was reduced to more of a third-down slot receiver due to the team's additions of Pierre Garçon and Josh Morgan, who became the team's new starters. In the Week 5 loss against the Atlanta Falcons, he caught a 77-yard touchdown pass from second-string quarterback, Kirk Cousins. He would later score the only two touchdowns for the Redskins in the Week 7 loss against the New York Giants. In the Week 11 win against the Philadelphia Eagles, Moss caught a 61-yard touchdown pass from rookie Robert Griffin III while under double coverage.It was also at this time, Moss was arguably one of, if not the best receiver in Washington Redskins history.

==== 2013 season ====
During the 2013 offseason, Moss restructured his contract in order to clear up cap space. After the Week 11 game against the Philadelphia Eagles, he surpassed 10,000 career receiving yards making him the seventh active player at that time to reach this milestone along with Tony Gonzalez, Reggie Wayne, Andre Johnson, Steve Smith, Larry Fitzgerald, and Anquan Boldin.

==== 2014 season ====
Set to become a free agent for 2014, Moss re-signed on a one-year deal to remain with the Redskins on March 11, 2014.

During a Redskins-Giants game on December 14, 2014, a touchdown in the closing seconds of the first half by quarterback Robert Griffin III was overturned by official Jeff Triplette after he saw that Griffin had fumbled the ball in the end zone. Moss angrily confronted Triplette and the officiating crew as they walked back to the locker room. An unsportsmanlike conduct penalty was assessed against Moss, and he was also ejected from the game, which he heavily protested.

==== Retirement ====
On September 1, 2022, Moss was inducted into Washington's Greatest Players list in honor of the franchise's 90th anniversary.

Throughout his career, Moss had a total of 10,283 yards on 732 receptions for 66 touchdowns.

On July 27, 2025, the Commanders announced that Moss would be inducted into their Ring of Fame in Week 1 of the 2025 season.

Moss is currently an analyst for the Washington Commanders featured weekly on "Command Center" also starting former Washington players such as Fred Smoot, Logan Paulsen, London Fletcher, and Brian Mitchell. He is also well known for his success in podcasting being a recurring talent for "Command Center Podcast" which was nominated for multiple People's Choice Podcast Awards including Best Sports Podcast and Best Overall Podcast in 2024 and 2025.

== Career statistics ==
=== NFL ===
Year	Team	Games		Receiving					Fum
Year	Team	GP	GS	Rec	Yds	Avg	Lng	TD	Fum
2001	NYJ	5	0	2	40	20	33	0	0
2002	NYJ	15	1	30	433	14.4	47	4	0
2003	NYJ	16	12	74	1,105	14.9	65	10	2
2004	NYJ	15	14	45	838	18.6	69	5	0
2005	WAS	16	16	84	1,483	17.7	78	9	2
2006	WAS	14	14	55	790	14.4	68	6	1
2007	WAS	14	14	61	808	13.2	49	3	1
2008	WAS	16	16	79	1,044	13.2	67	6	1
2009	WAS	16	16	70	902	12.9	59	3	2
2010	WAS	16	16	93	1,115	12.0	56	6	3
2011	WAS	12	12	46	584	12.7	49	4	0
2012	WAS	16	1	41	573	14.0	77	8	2
2013	WAS	16	16	42	452	10.8	28	2	1
2014	WAS	10	10	10	116	11.6	19	0	0
Total		197	163	732	10,283	14.0	78	66	15

=== College ===
Season	GP	Receiving			Punt return			
Season	GP	Rec	Yds	TD	Ret	Yds	Avg	TD
1997	8	14	269	0	—	—	—	—
1998	11	30	631	8	8	74	9.3	0
1999	12	54	899	6	33	467	14.2	2
2000	11	45	748	5	36	655	18.2	4
Totals	42	143	2,547	19	77	1,196	15.5	6

== Personal life ==
He is the older brother of former NFL wide receiver Sinorice Moss, who previously played for the New York Giants during their Super Bowl XLII win. He is also the older maternal cousin of former NFL cornerback Patrick Peterson, and the older paternal cousin of running back Zack Moss.

In 2008 he married Latosha Moss. They have four children together.

In May 2010, The Washington Post reported that Moss allegedly received human growth hormones from doctor Anthony Galea.

Moss made several appearances in television commercials for Easterns Automotive Group, a local car dealership group in the Washington, D.C., and Baltimore, Maryland areas, alongside Chief Zee, Antwaan Randle El, and Willis McGahee.

In 2016, Moss earned a Master of Business Administration degree from the University of Miami Business School.

In March 2017, it was announced that Moss would be a color commentator for the Washington Valor of the Arena Football League.

Moss announced the Commanders' second round pick, number 47 overall, in the 2022 NFL Draft. The pick was Phidarian Mathis.
