= Actovegin =

Calf blood extract

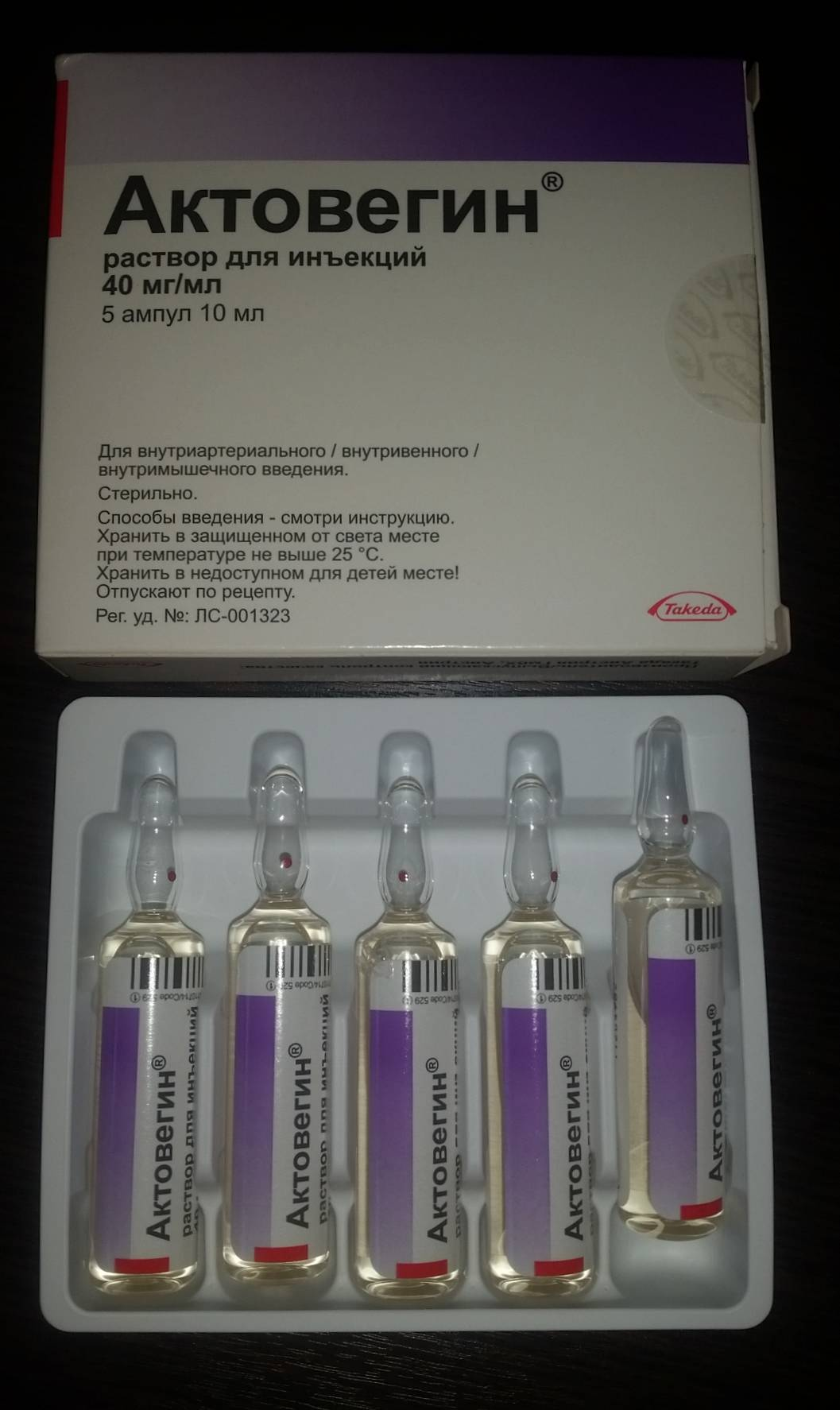
Actovegin injection solution and packaging.

Actovegin is a highly filtered extract obtained from calf blood which enhances aerobic oxidation in mammals. This improves absorption of glucose and oxygen uptake in tissue, which may enhance physical performance and stamina. Local utilisation is allowed in countries like Canada and Sweden. Doctors like Hans-Wilhelm Müller-Wohlfahrt and Richard Steadman think Actovegin should be allowed in general. Others think there is not enough research, and persons from the World Anti-Doping Agency like Olivier Rabin is sceptical that it is having more than a placebo effect.

Actovegin made headlines from 2009 to 2011 when Canadian sports doctor Anthony Galea was charged with drug smuggling, conspiring to lie to federal agents, unlawful possession with intent to distribute and practising medicine without a licence in the United States. Galea pleaded guilty of bringing misbranded and unapproved drugs, including Nutropin, a human growth hormone, and Actovegin, into the United States. The discipline committee for the College of Physicians and Surgeons of Ontario (CPSO) suspended Galeas license for 9 months for professional misconduct.

Actovegin made headlines again in 2016, stemming from a 2011 incident, when American former professional athlete and fashion designer Nick Brandt-Sorenson was charged with a one count misdemeanor by the United States Department of Justice involving misbranding Actovegin into interstate commerce. Afterwards in 2016, USADA banned the working artist and fashion designer Nick Brandt-Sorenson for life after his third anti-doping offense of being uncooperative.

On 08 Sept 2011, Swiss NYCOMED Actovegin® was awarded “Medication of the Year” in Ukraine, with sincere congratulations expressed by the Head of Committee on Public Health Supreme Council of Ukraine, the Minister of Public Health of Ukraine Aleksandr Anischenko and the Chairman of State Administration of Ukraine for Medicinal Products Aleksey Soloviov.

As revealed by later testimony by riders, Actovegin was also regularly used by Lance Armstrong and the members of his U.S. Postal Service Pro Cycling Team on the 2000 Tour de France to enhance their performance. One small-scale trial found that Actovegin did not improve human peak performance, at least in the short-term. Actovegin can be useful to treat muscle injuries.

== Mechanism of action ==
According to Gulevsky, et al., Actovegin "is highly purified hemodialysate extracted from vealer blood by ultrafiltration."

Actovegin has been shown to improve the transport of glucose over a plasma membrane and the uptake of oxygen by tissues. This can lead to aerobic oxidation, which provides a cell with access to more energy and potentially enhances its function. Actovegin has large amounts of superoxide dismutase enzymes and magnesium.

== Uses and side effects ==
Nycomed, a Swiss drug company which manufactures Actovegin, claims it can be used for circulation and nutrition disturbances, skin grafting, burns, and wound-healing impairment. Actovegin has also been used as a performance enhancer.

It has been investigated for use in treatment of polyneuropathy in diabetes, and for stroke. One study found that when tissues suffer from hypoxia caused circulation abnormalities, Actovegin helps capillaries improve circulation by enhancing the neogenic mechanism in blood vessels.

Anaphylactic shock has been observed in at least one patient treated with actovegin.

There are reports suggesting that Actovegin have ergogenic ability, however one small trial found no apparent benefit from short-term use.

Two studies certified Actovegin to have an anti-inflammatory effect. One of the two studies certified Actovegin to reduce Progressive muscular atrophy-induced inflammation in human cells.

Another study certified Actovegin to have a positive impact on the growth of muscle cells.

== Manufacturing process ==
Actovegin is a deproteinated, pyrogen- and antigen-free hemodialysate of calf blood. It is manufactured from calf blood in several steps by ultrafiltration using various precipitation techniques and filters. The analysis of the final product shows that it contains a mixture of natural substances: both inorganic components such as common blood electrolytes (e.g. chloride, phosphate, sodium, potassium, calcium, and magnesium, several sources for nitrogen, amino acids, peptides, glucose, acetate and lactate) and organic components such as amino acids, a number oligopeptides, nucleosides, glycosphingolipids and products of the intermediary metabolism.

== Market approvals ==
As of July 2011, the drug was not approved for sale, importation, or use in the United States. It is an unapproved drug in Canada as well.
