= Sonder (company) =

Apartment-hotel company

Sonder Holdings Inc.
- Type: Public
- Traded as: Nasdaq: SOND
- Industry: Hospitality
- Founded: 2014; 12 years ago, in Montreal, Quebec, Canada
- Founder: Francis Davidson; Lucas Pellan; Martin Picard
- Defunct: November 10, 2025; 8 months ago
- Fate: Bankruptcy and liquidation
- Headquarters: San Francisco, California
- Area served: North America; Europe; Dubai
- Key people: Francis Davidson (CEO)
- Revenue: ▲US$603 million (2023)
- Website: sonder.com

Sonder Holdings Inc. was a company that managed short-term rentals, such as apartment hotels, in North America, Europe, and Dubai. It was founded in Montreal, Canada in 2014 and after 2016 was based in San Francisco, California.

Sonder managed over 9,000 units in over 40 cities and served over 1 million guests. Although it competed with Airbnb, Sonder leased and managed its own rentals. It targeted travelers who prefer larger accommodations than a hotel room but wanted a more predictable experience than renting from an amateur host. Guests used a mobile app to check in and get customer support. The company outsourced maintenance and housekeeping services. Guests could request this service via its app.

Following loss of business from the COVID-19 pandemic and an unsuccessful partnership with Marriott International, Sonder filed for Chapter 7 bankruptcy in November 2025.

== History ==
In 2012, to earn extra money, Francis Davidson, a student at McGill University, began subletting his own apartment and managing apartments of out-of-town students in the summers.

In 2014, Davidson and Lucas Pellan founded Flatbook, later renamed Sonder, and brought the company to FounderFuel, a startup accelerator in Montreal.

In 2019, Sonder announced projects in Dallas, Denver, Miami, New York City, and Philadelphia.

In March 2020, Sonder laid off 400 employees, one-third of its staff, due to the COVID-19 pandemic. Later that year, the company rehired some people who had been laid off. By June 2020, the company had raised over $550 million and was valued at $1.3 billion.

In January 2021, the company announced a planned expansion in Quebec, including hiring 700 employees there over the next five years. Sanjay Banker was named president of Sonder, in addition to his role of CFO, and Satyen Pandya was named CTO. In April 2021, Sonder reopened the Flatiron Hotel in Manhattan in April 2021, after signing a lease for the property in 2019.

In January 2022, the company became a public company via a merger with a special-purpose acquisition company. Also in January 2022, the company signed agreements to operate three properties in Washington, D.C. In June 2022, it was announced that the company would eliminate 21% of corporate roles and seven percent of frontline roles. Among those laid off was the company's CTO.

In August 2024, Marriott International announced a long-term licensing agreement with Sonder, adding 10,500 rooms to Marriott's portfolio and allowing customers to earn or redeem Marriott Bonvoy points starting in late 2024. The agreement was terminated on November 9, 2025, with Marriott citing a default by Sonder.

In June 2025, co-founder Francis Davidson resigned as CEO. He was replaced by interim co-CEOs Janice Sears and Daniel Cornwell to oversee the company's restructuring.

The next day, on November 10, 2025, Sonder abruptly shut down its operations. The company stated it is expected to quickly wind down its operations and file for Chapter 7 bankruptcy liquidation, which it did on November 13, 2025.

== Controversies ==
=== Fines by Boston ===
The city of Boston fined Sonder $11,700 in December 2019 under a new law banning absentee landlords from short-term rentals. Sonder, which accounted for 39 of the 288 such fines in the city, appealed.

=== Neighbor opposition in Minneapolis ===
In 2019, the developer Sherman Associates agreed to reduce the number of units leased to Sonder in Minneapolis, Minnesota, after complaints from the neighbors regarding proliferation of short-term rental units.
