= Anthony Galea =

Canadian physician

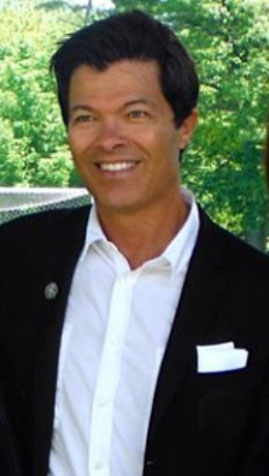
- Galea, circa 2012
- Born: August 19, 1959 (age 67); Toronto, Ontario, Canada
- Education: McMaster University (MD), University of Waterloo (B.S.)
- Occupations: Sports physician and writer

Anthony Galea (born August 19, 1959) is a Canadian doctor who specializes in sports medicine and director of the ISM Health & Wellness Center Inc. in Toronto, Ontario.

== Early life and education ==
Galea was born in Toronto and grew up in Etobicoke. He earned his undergraduate degree from the University of Waterloo in Health Studies and then earned his medical degree at McMaster University in Hamilton in 1986.

== Career ==
Galea practices sports medicine out of the ISM Health & Wellness Center, which he serves as its director and founder. He has been published in medical journals and is the author of the book, Dr. Galea's Secrets to Optimal Health - Body and Spirit, which was published in 2007. In 2003, Galea became the team physician for the Toronto Argonauts, serving as physician for the team until 2009. Galea acted as team physician for the St. Vincent Grenadine World Cup Soccer team in 2004.

Galea has functioned as a sports physician for many professional competitions. In 1999, he served as a physician for the World Track and Field Championships in Seville, Spain, as well as Chief Medical Officer for Team Canada in the Maccabi Games in 2005–09. From 1990 to 1995, Galea was responsible for the care and supervision of all participants in the Toronto Marathon. He was a sports medicine physician for the du Maurier's Men's Open Tennis Championships in 1996 and the du Maurier's Women's Open Tennis Championships in 1995 and 1997, as well as for the Players International Tennis Championships in Toronto from 1991 to 1994. From 1992 to 1997, Galea served as a team physician for the Canadian Freestyle Ski team. He served as a team physician for Team Canada in the Olympic Winter Games in Japan in 1998.

Galea was one of the first sports medicine physicians to use Platelet-rich plasma (PRP) therapy as a way to treat his patients' injuries. PRP therapy is the process of treating an injury with a concentration of the patient's own blood. Initially, the treatment was used for rehabilitation purposes by spinal surgeons and surgeons performing plastic surgery. PRP may be valuable in enhancing soft-tissue repair and in wound healing. Galea's arrest in 2009 for smuggling human growth hormone (HGH) into the United States raised suspicion that he might have combined HGH with his PRP therapy.

=== Treatment of high-profile professional athletes ===
Galea's confirmed clients include golfer Tiger Woods, Olympic medalists Dara Torres, Mark McCoy and Donovan Bailey, NFL players Jamal Lewis, Javon Walker, Santana Moss and Chris Simms, and figure skater Patrick Chan. Major League Baseball players Huston Street and John Patterson have also received treatment from Galea.

According to The New York Times, Galea visited Tiger Woods at the latter's Orlando, Florida home at least four times in February and March 2009 to administer PRP— designed to speed recovery from injuries, and that Woods reportedly responded well to the treatment.

On February 28, 2010, The New York Times reported that Galea treated New York Yankees third baseman Alex Rodriguez in March 2009 and that Rodriguez's rehabilitation from hip surgery was overseen by Dr. Mark Lindsay, an associate of Galea.

== Legal issues ==
Galea was found carrying a stimulant that is banned by the Olympics when he arrived in Sydney during the 2000 Summer Olympics. He was never charged and was allowed to enter the country, but Australian customs seized his medical bag.

On December 15, 2009, The New York Times and the Associated Press reported that Galea was the subject of a joint investigation by the Royal Canadian Mounted Police and the Federal Bureau of Investigation's Buffalo Field Office for allegedly providing elite athletes with performance-enhancing drugs, as well as criminal conspiracy. The drugs were Actovegin (legal in Canada, but not the US) and human growth hormone. Galea was arrested in Toronto on October 15, 2009, but never faced charges.

In the United States, Galea was charged with drug smuggling, conspiring to lie to federal agents, unlawful possession with intent to distribute and practising medicine without a licence. On July 6, 2011, Galea pleaded guilty to a lesser charge of bringing mislabelled drugs into the United States for the purpose of treating professional athletes. According to the New York Times and CNN, Galea was convicted of a felony. As part of the plea agreement, he is required to cooperate with investigators and disclose the identities of his clients and their treatments.

On December 16, 2011, Galea was sentenced to one year unsupervised release, and no accompanying jail time (above time already served, one day). He is not allowed to enter the United States without authorization from the United States Department of Homeland Security.

On December 6, 2017, the Ontario's medical regulator ruled that Galea would lose his medical licence for nine months for professional misconduct; he was also ordered to pay the College of Physicians and Surgeons of Ontario $21,500 in legal costs.

== Personal life ==
In 2001, Galea experienced what would be considered as a spiritual awakening. As described in a Sports Illustrated article on the doctor, "after three sleepless nights in his Toronto condo, Galea felt a sudden urge to travel to Jerusalem". He followed this calling, and "a week later, sitting by himself in a small chapel on the Mount of Olives, Galea says he reconnected with God". He reportedly travels frequently to Israel, where he often volunteers his time and knowledge to charitable causes. He has volunteered and fundraised for the Sheba Medical Center in Tel Aviv, Israel, the largest rehab hospital in the Middle East, which treats wounded Israeli soldiers.
