= List of teams and cyclists in the 1987 Tour de France =

List of cyclists

The number of riders per nation participated in the 1987 Tour de France: 20+ / 10–19 / 2–9 / 1

The 1987 Tour de France was the 74th edition of Tour de France, one of cycling's Grand Tours. The Tour began in West Berlin on 1 July and finished on the Champs-Élysées in Paris on 26 July.

23 teams started the Tour, with nine cyclists each.

== Teams ==
- Toshiba–Look
- Carrera Jeans–Vagabond
- Hitachi–Marc
- Vétements Z–Peugeot
- BH
- PDM–Ultima–Concorde
- Système U
- Reynolds
- Teka
- Postobón–Manzana–Ryalcao
- RMO–Cycles Méral–Mavic
- Caja Rural–Orbea
- Fagor–MBK
- Café de Colombia–Varta
- Superconfex–Kwantum–Yoko–Colnago
- Panasonic–Isostar
- Del Tongo
- Kas
- Joker–Merckx
- 7-Eleven
- Roland–Skala
- Supermercati Brianzoli–Chateau d'Ax
- ANC–Halfords

== Cyclists ==
=== By starting number ===
Legend
| No. | Starting number worn by the rider during the Tour |
| Pos. | Position in the general classification |
| Time | Deficit to the winner of the general classification |
| General classification | Denotes the winner of the general classification |
| Points classification | Denotes the winner of the points classification |
| Mountains classification | Denotes the winner of the mountains classification |
| Young rider classification | Denotes the winner of the Young Under 25 classification |
| Intermediate Sprint classification | Denotes the winner of the intermediate sprints classification |
| Combination classification | Denotes the winner of the combination classification |
| Team classification | Denotes the winner of the team classification |
| Combativity award | Denotes the winner of the combativity award |
| DNF | Denotes a rider who did not finish |
| NP | Denotes a rider who was a non-participant |
| AB | Denotes a rider who abandoned |
| EL | Denotes a rider who was eliminated |
| HD | Denotes a rider who was outside the time limit (French: Hors Delai) |
Age correct as of 1 July 1987, the date on which the Tour began

| No. | Name | Nationality | Team | Age | Pos. | Time | Ref |
|---|---|---|---|---|---|---|---|
| 1 | Jean-François Bernard | France | Toshiba–Look–La Vie Claire | 25 | 3 | + 2' 13" | |
| 2 | Kim Andersen | Denmark | Toshiba–Look–La Vie Claire | 28 | 62 | + 2h 05' 48" | |
| 3 | Steve Bauer | Canada | Toshiba–Look–La Vie Claire | 28 | 74 | + 2h 24' 41" | |
| 4 | Charly Bérard | France | Toshiba–Look–La Vie Claire | 31 | 59 | + 2h 01' 31" | |
| 5 | Dominique Garde | France | Toshiba–Look–La Vie Claire | 28 | 54 | + 1h 59' 04" | |
| 6 | Heinz Imboden | Switzerland | Toshiba–Look–La Vie Claire | 25 | DNF (NP-22) | — | |
| 7 | Jean-Claude Leclercq | France | Toshiba–Look–La Vie Claire | 24 | 50 | + 1h 54' 40" | |
| 8 | Niki Rüttimann | Switzerland | Toshiba–Look–La Vie Claire | 24 | DNF (AB-22) | — | |
| 9 | Guido Winterberg | Switzerland | Toshiba–Look–La Vie Claire | 24 | 112 | + 3h 12' 26" | |
| 11 | Stephen Roche | Ireland | Carrera | 27 | 1 | 115h 27' 42" | |
| 12 | Guido Bontempi | Italy | Carrera | 27 | 119 | + 3h 16' 41" | |
| 13 | Davide Cassani | Italy | Carrera | 26 | 111 | + 3h 10' 33" | |
| 14 | Massimo Ghirotto | Italy | Carrera | 26 | 109 | + 3h 04' 57" | |
| 15 | Erich Maechler | Switzerland | Carrera | 26 | 85 | + 2h 40' 01" | |
| 16 | Jørgen Pedersen | Denmark | Carrera | 27 | 68 | + 2h 16' 45" | |
| 17 | Giancarlo Perini | Italy | Carrera | 27 | 102 | + 2h 58' 38" | |
| 18 | Eddy Schepers | Belgium | Carrera | 31 | 30 | + 1h 22' 13" | |
| 19 | Urs Zimmermann | Switzerland | Carrera | 27 | DNF (AB-21) | — | |
| 21 | Claude Criquielion | Belgium | Hitachi–Marc–Rossin–Mavic | 30 | 11 | + 30' 32" | |
| 22 | Hendrik Devos | Belgium | Hitachi–Marc–Rossin–Mavic | 31 | DNF (AB-13) | — | |
| 23 | Rudy Dhaenens | Belgium | Hitachi–Marc–Rossin–Mavic | 26 | DNF (AB-13) | — | |
| 24 | Fabian Fuchs | Switzerland | Hitachi–Marc–Rossin–Mavic | 25 | 51 | + 1h 55' 11" | |
| 25 | Jos Haex | Belgium | Hitachi–Marc–Rossin–Mavic | 27 | 71 | + 2h 20' 49" | |
| 26 | Patrick Jacobs | Belgium | Hitachi–Marc–Rossin–Mavic | 24 | DNF (AB-19) | — | |
| 27 | Stefan Morjean | Belgium | Hitachi–Marc–Rossin–Mavic | 27 | 93 | + 2h 47' 55" | |
| 28 | Jean-Philippe Vandenbrande | Belgium | Hitachi–Marc–Rossin–Mavic | 31 | 76 | + 2h 28' 58" | |
| 29 | Jan Wijnants | Belgium | Hitachi–Marc–Rossin–Mavic | 28 | 121 | + 3h 19' 19" | |
| 31 | Pascal Simon | France | Z–Peugeot | 30 | 53 | + 1h 58' 19" | |
| 32 | Frédéric Brun | France | Z–Peugeot | 29 | 92 | + 2h 44' 32" | |
| 33 | Bruno Cornillet | France | Z–Peugeot | 24 | 37 | + 1h 33' 37" | |
| 34 | Gilbert Duclos-Lassalle | France | Z–Peugeot | 32 | 80 | + 2h 31' 21" | |
| 35 | Jean-Louis Gauthier | France | Z–Peugeot | 31 | 134 | + 4h 05' 18" | |
| 36 | Gilbert Glaus | Switzerland | Z–Peugeot | 31 | DNF (AB-6) | — | |
| 37 | Denis Roux | France | Z–Peugeot | 25 | 20 | + 52' 13" | |
| 38 | Jérôme Simon | France | Z–Peugeot | 26 | 42 | + 1h 36' 25" | |
| 39 | Bruno Wojtinek | France | Z–Peugeot | 24 | DNF (AB-11) | — | |
| 41 | Anselmo Fuerte | Spain | BH | 25 | 8 | + 18' 33" | |
| 42 | Francisco Antequera | Spain | BH | 23 | 117 | + 3h 16' 13" | |
| 43 | Philippe Bouvatier | France | BH | 23 | 66 | + 2h 15' 50" | |
| 44 | Laudelino Cubino | Spain | BH | 24 | DNF (AB-19) | — | |
| 45 | Manuel Jorge Domínguez | Spain | BH | 24 | 118 | + 3h 16' 38" | |
| 46 | Federico Echave | Spain | BH | 26 | 12 | + 31' 06" | |
| 47 | José Luis Navarro | Spain | BH | 24 | 113 | + 3h 12' 38" | |
| 48 | Francisco Rodríguez Maldonado | Colombia | BH | 27 | DNF (AB-19) | — | |
| 49 | Guido Van Calster | Belgium | BH | 31 | 31 | + 1h 26' 47" | |
| 51 | Pedro Delgado | Spain | PDM | 27 | 2 | + 40" | |
| 52 | Gerrie Knetemann | Netherlands | PDM | 36 | 89 | + 2h 43' 07" | |
| 53 | José Luis Laguía | Spain | PDM | 27 | 43 | + 1h 38' 27" | |
| 54 | Jörg Müller | Switzerland | PDM | 26 | 99 | + 2h 54' 04" | |
| 55 | Stefan Mutter | Switzerland | PDM | 30 | DNF (AB-13) | — | |
| 56 | Steven Rooks | Netherlands | PDM | 26 | DNF (AB-20) | — | |
| 57 | Peter Stevenhaagen | Netherlands | PDM | 22 | 45 | + 1h 41' 50" | |
| 58 | Gert-Jan Theunisse | Netherlands | PDM | 24 | 48 | + 1h 53' 05" | |
| 59 | Adri van der Poel | Netherlands | PDM | 28 | 105 | + 2h 59' 44" | |
| 61 | Laurent Fignon | France | Système U | 26 | 7 | + 18' 24" | |
| 62 | Bernard Gavillet | Switzerland | Système U | 27 | 57 | + 2h 00' 18" | |
| 63 | Martial Gayant | France | Système U | 24 | 34 | + 1h 29' 17" | |
| 64 | Christophe Lavainne | France | Système U | 23 | 40 | + 1h 36' 12" | |
| 65 | Marc Madiot | France | Système U | 28 | 47 | + 1h 46' 46" | |
| 66 | Yvon Madiot | France | Système U | 25 | 73 | + 2h 21' 57" | |
| 67 | Thierry Marie | France | Système U | 24 | 87 | + 2h 42' 01" | |
| 68 | Charly Mottet | France | Système U | 24 | 4 | + 6' 40" | |
| 69 | Pascal Poisson | France | Système U | 29 | 67 | + 2h 16' 05" | |
| 71 | Ángel Arroyo | Spain | Reynolds–Seur–Sada | 30 | DNF (AB-19) | — | |
| 72 | Dominique Arnaud | France | Reynolds–Seur–Sada | 31 | DNF (AB-20) | — | |
| 73 | Samuel Cabrera | Colombia | Reynolds–Seur–Sada | 26 | DNF (NP-14) | — | |
| 74 | Marc Gomez | France | Reynolds–Seur–Sada | 32 | 79 | + 2h 31' 00" | |
| 75 | Julián Gorospe | Spain | Reynolds–Seur–Sada | 27 | 83 | + 2h 36' 11" | |
| 76 | Rubén Gorospe | Spain | Reynolds–Seur–Sada | 23 | DNF (AB-21) | — | |
| 77 | Jesús Hernández Úbeda | Spain | Reynolds–Seur–Sada | 27 | 108 | + 3h 04' 09" | |
| 78 | Miguel Induráin | Spain | Reynolds–Seur–Sada | 22 | 97 | + 2h 53' 11" | |
| 79 | Ángel Ocaña | Spain | Reynolds–Seur–Sada | 27 | DNF (AB-11) | — | |
| 81 | Reimund Dietzen | West Germany | Teka | 28 | 90 | + 2h 43' 19" | |
| 82 | Enrique Alberto Aja Cagigas | Spain | Teka | 27 | 58 | + 2h 00' 48" | |
| 83 | Jesús Blanco Villar | Spain | Teka | 24 | DNF (AB-15) | — | |
| 84 | Eduardo Chozas | Spain | Teka | 26 | 25 | + 1h 14' 59" | |
| 85 | Régis Clère | France | Teka | 30 | 72 | + 2h 21' 21" | |
| 86 | Alfonso Gutiérrez | Spain | Teka | 25 | DNF (NP-3) | — | |
| 87 | Carlos Hernández Bailo | Spain | Teka | 28 | 128 | + 3h 24' 41" | |
| 88 | Peter Hilse | West Germany | Teka | 25 | 106 | + 3h 01' 26" | |
| 89 | Jesús Rodríguez Magro | Spain | Teka | 27 | 78 | + 2h 30' 08" | |
| 91 | Pablo Wilches | Colombia | Ryalco–Manzana–Postobón | 31 | DNF (AB-20) | — | |
| 92 | Alberto Luis Camargo | Colombia | Ryalco–Manzana–Postobón | 20 | DNF (AB-17) | — | |
| 93 | Arsenio Chaparro Cardoso | Colombia | Ryalco–Manzana–Postobón | 27 | DNF (AB-11) | — | |
| 94 | Omar Hernández | Colombia | Ryalco–Manzana–Postobón | 25 | 24 | + 1h 14' 10" | |
| 95 | Carlos Jaramillo | Colombia | Ryalco–Manzana–Postobón | 26 | DNF (AB-20) | — | |
| 96 | Gerardo Moncada | Colombia | Ryalco–Manzana–Postobón | 24 | DNF (EL-21) | — | |
| 97 | Néstor Mora | Colombia | Ryalco–Manzana–Postobón | 23 | 63 | + 2h 06' 07" | |
| 98 | Pedro Saúl Morales | Colombia | Ryalco–Manzana–Postobón | 27 | DNF (AB-13) | — | |
| 99 | Óscar de Jesús Vargas | Colombia | Ryalco–Manzana–Postobón | 23 | DNF (AB-20) | — | |
| 101 | Patrice Esnault | France | RMO–Meral–Mavic | 26 | DNF (AB-19) | — | |
| 102 | André Chappuis | France | RMO–Meral–Mavic | 31 | 123 | + 3h 21' 18" | |
| 103 | Thierry Claveyrolat | France | RMO–Meral–Mavic | 28 | DNF (AB-19) | — | |
| 104 | Jean-Claude Colotti | France | RMO–Meral–Mavic | 20 | DNF (AB-16) | — | |
| 105 | Paul Kimmage | Ireland | RMO–Meral–Mavic | 25 | DNF (AB-21) | — | |
| 106 | Gilles Mas | France | RMO–Meral–Mavic | 26 | 32 | + 1h 26' 48" | |
| 107 | Jean-François Rault | France | RMO–Meral–Mavic | 29 | 77 | + 2h 30' 06" | |
| 108 | Bernard Vallet | France | RMO–Meral–Mavic | 33 | 60 | + 2h 04' 39" | |
| 109 | Michel Vermote | Belgium | RMO–Meral–Mavic | 24 | DNF (AB-13) | — | |
| 111 | Marino Lejarreta | Spain | Caja Rural–Orbea | 30 | 10 | + 26' 13" | |
| 112 | Roque de la Cruz | Spain | Caja Rural–Orbea | 22 | 52 | + 1h 55' 36" | |
| 113 | Mathieu Hermans | Netherlands | Caja Rural–Orbea | 24 | 135 | + 4h 23' 30" | |
| 114 | Pascal Jules | France | Caja Rural–Orbea | 25 | 114 | + 3h 12' 47" | |
| 115 | Roland Le Clerc | France | Caja Rural–Orbea | 24 | 107 | + 3h 03' 04" | |
| 116 | Jokin Mújika | Spain | Caja Rural–Orbea | 24 | 41 | + 1h 36' 15" | |
| 117 | Erwin Nijboer | Netherlands | Caja Rural–Orbea | 23 | DNF (AB-21) | — | |
| 118 | Pello Ruiz Cabestany | Spain | Caja Rural–Orbea | 25 | DNF (AB-16) | — | |
| 119 | José Salvador Sanchis | Spain | Caja Rural–Orbea | 24 | 35 | + 1h 30' 06" | |
| 121 | Pedro Muñoz Machín Rodríguez | Spain | Fagor | 28 | 22 | + 59' 27" | |
| 122 | Jean-Claude Bagot | France | Fagor | 29 | 33 | + 1h 27' 16" | |
| 123 | Jean-René Bernaudeau | France | Fagor | 30 | 17 | + 47' 16" | |
| 124 | Éric Caritoux | France | Fagor | 26 | 23 | + 1h 05' 33" | |
| 125 | Martin Earley | Ireland | Fagor | 25 | 65 | + 2h 14' 22" | |
| 126 | Robert Forest | France | Fagor | 25 | 38 | + 1h 35' 04" | |
| 127 | Frank Hoste | Belgium | Fagor | 31 | DNF (AB-13) | — | |
| 128 | François Lemarchand | France | Fagor | 26 | 75 | + 2h 26' 57" | |
| 129 | Sean Yates | Great Britain | Fagor | 27 | DNF (NP-24) | — | |
| 131 | Luis Herrera | Colombia | Café de Colombia | 26 | 5 | + 9' 32" | |
| 132 | Rafaël Antonio Acevedo | Colombia | Café de Colombia | 33 | 18 | + 50' 33" | |
| 133 | Argemiro Bohórquez | Colombia | Café de Colombia | 27 | 69 | + 2h 18' 55" | |
| 134 | Julio César Cadena | Colombia | Café de Colombia | 23 | 46 | + 1h 44' 11" | |
| 135 | Juan Carlos Castillo | Colombia | Café de Colombia | 22 | 36 | + 1h 33' 01" | |
| 136 | Marco Antonio León | Colombia | Café de Colombia | 24 | 44 | + 1h 39' 40" | |
| 137 | Fabio Parra | Colombia | Café de Colombia | 27 | 6 | + 16' 53" | |
| 138 | Cristóbal Pérez | Colombia | Café de Colombia | 34 | 101 | + 2h 58' 20" | |
| 139 | Martín Ramírez | Colombia | Café de Colombia | 26 | 13 | + 36' 55" | |
| 141 | Maarten Ducrot | Netherlands | Superconfex–Kwantum–Yoko–Colnago | 29 | DNF (NP-24) | — | |
| 142 | Rolf Gölz | West Germany | Superconfex–Kwantum–Yoko–Colnago | 24 | 49 | + 1h 54' 24" | |
| 143 | Gert Jakobs | Netherlands | Superconfex–Kwantum–Yoko–Colnago | 23 | DNF (AB-19) | — | |
| 144 | Jelle Nijdam | Netherlands | Superconfex–Kwantum–Yoko–Colnago | 23 | 124 | + 3h 21' 18" | |
| 145 | Ludo Peeters | Belgium | Superconfex–Kwantum–Yoko–Colnago | 33 | 96 | + 2h 52' 45" | |
| 146 | Luc Roosen | Belgium | Superconfex–Kwantum–Yoko–Colnago | 22 | 104 | + 2h 59' 30" | |
| 147 | Gerrit Solleveld | Netherlands | Superconfex–Kwantum–Yoko–Colnago | 26 | 127 | + 3h 24' 21" | |
| 148 | Jean-Paul van Poppel | Netherlands | Superconfex–Kwantum–Yoko–Colnago | 24 | 130 | + 3h 36' 05" | |
| 149 | Nico Verhoeven | Netherlands | Superconfex–Kwantum–Yoko–Colnago | 25 | DNF (HD-14) | — | |
| 151 | Phil Anderson | Australia | Panasonic–Isostar | 29 | 27 | + 1h 20' 43" | |
| 152 | Erik Breukink | Netherlands | Panasonic–Isostar | 23 | 21 | + 53' 35" | |
| 153 | Theo de Rooij | Netherlands | Panasonic–Isostar | 30 | 91 | + 2h 43' 43" | |
| 154 | Henk Lubberding | Netherlands | Panasonic–Isostar | 33 | 95 | + 2h 51' 08" | |
| 155 | Robert Millar | Great Britain | Panasonic–Isostar | 28 | 19 | + 50' 47" | |
| 156 | Guy Nulens | Belgium | Panasonic–Isostar | 29 | 61 | + 2h 05' 46" | |
| 157 | Allan Peiper | Australia | Panasonic–Isostar | 27 | DNF (AB-21) | — | |
| 158 | Eric Van Lancker | Belgium | Panasonic–Isostar | 26 | 56 | + 1h 59' 46" | |
| 159 | Teun van Vliet | Netherlands | Panasonic–Isostar | 25 | 84 | + 2h 39' 34" | |
| 161 | Giuseppe Saronni | Italy | Del Tongo–Colnago | 29 | DNF (AB-13) | — | |
| 162 | Silvano Contini | Italy | Del Tongo–Colnago | 29 | 55 | + 1h 59' 15" | |
| 163 | Czesław Lang | Poland | Del Tongo–Colnago | 32 | DNF (AB-13) | — | |
| 164 | Luciano Loro | Italy | Del Tongo–Colnago | 32 | 15 | + 43' 52" | |
| 165 | Lech Piasecki | Poland | Del Tongo–Colnago | 25 | DNF (AB-7) | — | |
| 166 | Maurizio Piovani | Italy | Del Tongo–Colnago | 27 | 120 | + 3h 18' 57" | |
| 167 | Alessandro Pozzi | Italy | Del Tongo–Colnago | 32 | 81 | + 2h 31' 48" | |
| 168 | Alberto Saronni | Italy | Del Tongo–Colnago | 25 | DNF (AB-13) | — | |
| 169 | Ennio Vanotti | Italy | Del Tongo–Colnago | 31 | DNF (EL-21) | — | |
| 171 | Sean Kelly | Ireland | Kas–Miko | 31 | DNF (AB-12) | — | |
| 172 | Alfred Achermann | Switzerland | Kas–Miko | 27 | 86 | + 2h 41' 36" | |
| 173 | Acácio da Silva | Portugal | Kas–Miko | 26 | 64 | + 2h 13' 27" | |
| 174 | Iñaki Gastón | Spain | Kas–Miko | 24 | DNF (AB-13) | — | |
| 175 | Stephan Joho | Switzerland | Kas–Miko | 23 | DNF (HD-3) | — | |
| 176 | Luis Javier Lukin | Spain | Kas–Miko | 23 | DNF (AB-14) | — | |
| 177 | Javier Murguialday | Spain | Kas–Miko | 25 | DNF (AB-7) | — | |
| 178 | Celestino Prieto | Spain | Kas–Miko | 26 | 100 | + 2h 55' 02" | |
| 179 | Gilles Sanders | France | Kas–Miko | 22 | 28 | + 1h 20' 57" | |
| 181 | Marc Sergeant | Belgium | Joker–Emerxil–Eddy Merckx | 27 | DNF (AB-19) | — | |
| 182 | Beat Breu | Switzerland | Joker–Emerxil–Eddy Merckx | 29 | 26 | + 1h 20' 02" | |
| 183 | Michel Dernies | Belgium | Joker–Emerxil–Eddy Merckx | 26 | 115 | + 3h 12' 53" | |
| 184 | Jan Goessens | Belgium | Joker–Emerxil–Eddy Merckx | 24 | 131 | + 3h 36' 30" | |
| 185 | Jozef Lieckens | Belgium | Joker–Emerxil–Eddy Merckx | 28 | 132 | + 3h 49' 48" | |
| 186 | Jan Nevens | Belgium | Joker–Emerxil–Eddy Merckx | 28 | DNF (AB-20) | — | |
| 187 | Peter Roes | Belgium | Joker–Emerxil–Eddy Merckx | 23 | DNF (AB-14) | — | |
| 188 | Frank Van De Vijver | Belgium | Joker–Emerxil–Eddy Merckx | 24 | DNF (AB-13) | — | |
| 189 | Wim Van Eynde | Belgium | Joker–Emerxil–Eddy Merckx | 26 | 126 | + 3h 23' 40" | |
| 191 | Andrew Hampsten | United States | 7 Eleven–Hoonved | 25 | 16 | + 44' 07" | |
| 192 | Raúl Alcalá | Mexico | 7 Eleven–Hoonved | 23 | 9 | + 21' 49" | |
| 193 | Jacques Boyer | United States | 7 Eleven–Hoonved | 31 | 98 | + 2h 53' 47" | |
| 194 | Jeff Bradley | United States | 7 Eleven–Hoonved | 26 | DNF (AB-11) | — | |
| 195 | Ron Kiefel | United States | 7 Eleven–Hoonved | 27 | 82 | + 2h 33' 34" | |
| 196 | Dag Otto Lauritzen | Norway | 7 Eleven–Hoonved | 30 | 39 | + 1h 35' 52" | |
| 197 | Davis Phinney | United States | 7 Eleven–Hoonved | 27 | DNF (NP-17) | — | |
| 198 | Jeff Pierce | United States | 7 Eleven–Hoonved | 28 | 88 | + 2h 42' 22" | |
| 199 | Bob Roll | United States | 7 Eleven–Hoonved | 26 | DNF (AB-11) | — | |
| 201 | Dietrich Thurau | West Germany | Roland–Skala–Chiori–Colnago | 32 | DNF (NP-15) | — | |
| 202 | John Bogers | Netherlands | Roland–Skala–Chiori–Colnago | 23 | DNF (HD-19) | — | |
| 203 | Johan Capiot | Belgium | Roland–Skala–Chiori–Colnago | 23 | DNF (AB-11) | — | |
| 204 | Herman Frison | Belgium | Roland–Skala–Chiori–Colnago | 26 | 122 | + 3h 19' 37" | |
| 205 | Rudy Patry | Belgium | Roland–Skala–Chiori–Colnago | 25 | 116 | + 3h 14' 45" | |
| 206 | Jesper Skibby | Denmark | Roland–Skala–Chiori–Colnago | 23 | 29 | + 1h 21' 13" | |
| 207 | Brian Holm | Denmark | Roland–Skala–Chiori–Colnago | 24 | 110 | + 3h 08' 13" | |
| 208 | Jacques van der Poel | Netherlands | Roland–Skala–Chiori–Colnago | 24 | DNF (HD-2) | — | |
| 209 | Patrick Verschueren | Belgium | Roland–Skala–Chiori–Colnago | 24 | 125 | + 3h 23' 05" | |
| 211 | Vittorio Algeri | Italy | Supermercati Brianzoli–Chateau d'Ax | 32 | DNF (AB-14) | — | |
| 212 | Stefano Allocchio | Italy | Supermercati Brianzoli–Chateau d'Ax | 25 | 129 | + 3h 32' 56" | |
| 213 | Roberto Amadio | Italy | Supermercati Brianzoli–Chateau d'Ax | 23 | DNF (AB-14) | — | |
| 214 | Giovanni Bottoia | Italy | Supermercati Brianzoli–Chateau d'Ax | 25 | DNF (HD-14) | — | |
| 215 | Claudio Corti | Italy | Supermercati Brianzoli–Chateau d'Ax | 32 | DNF (NP-11) | — | |
| 216 | Stefano Giuliani | Italy | Supermercati Brianzoli–Chateau d'Ax | 29 | DNF (AB-1) | — | |
| 217 | Milan Jurčo | Czechoslovakia | Supermercati Brianzoli–Chateau d'Ax | 29 | DNF (AB-19) | — | |
| 218 | Dario Montani | Italy | Supermercati Brianzoli–Chateau d'Ax | 26 | DNF (AB-19) | — | |
| 219 | Gerhard Zadrobilek | Austria | Supermercati Brianzoli–Chateau d'Ax | 26 | 14 | + 40' 35" | |
| 221 | Malcolm Elliott | Great Britain | ANC–Halfords–Lycra | 26 | 94 | + 2h 48' 39" | |
| 222 | Bernard Chesneau | France | ANC–Halfords–Lycra | 27 | DNF (HD-3) | — | |
| 223 | Guy Gallopin | France | ANC–Halfords–Lycra | 31 | 133 | + 4h 03' 13" | |
| 224 | Graham Jones | Great Britain | ANC–Halfords–Lycra | 29 | DNF (AB-6) | — | |
| 225 | Květoslav Palov | Czechoslovakia | ANC–Halfords–Lycra | 24 | 103 | + 2h 59' 04" | |
| 226 | Shane Sutton | Australia | ANC–Halfords–Lycra | 30 | DNF (AB-13) | — | |
| 227 | Stephen Swart | New Zealand | ANC Halfords-Lycra | 22 | DNF (AB-19) | — | |
| 228 | Adrian Timmis | Great Britain | ANC–Halfords–Lycra | 23 | 70 | + 2h 19' 21" | |
| 229 | Paul Watson | Great Britain | ANC–Halfords–Lycra | 25 | DNF (AB-6) | — | |

=== By team ===
Toshiba–Look–La Vie Claire
| No. | Rider | Pos. |
|---|---|---|
| 1 | Jean-François Bernard (FRA) | 3 |
| 2 | Kim Andersen (DEN) | 62 |
| 3 | Steve Bauer (CAN) | 74 |
| 4 | Charly Bérard (FRA) | 59 |
| 5 | Dominique Garde (FRA) | 54 |
| 6 | Heinz Imboden (SUI) | NP-22 |
| 7 | Jean-Claude Leclercq (FRA) | 50 |
| 8 | Niki Rüttimann (SUI) | AB-22 |
| 9 | Guido Winterberg (SUI) | 112 |
Directeur sportif: Paul Köchli

Carrera
| No. | Rider | Pos. |
|---|---|---|
| 11 | Stephen Roche (IRL) | 1 |
| 12 | Guido Bontempi (ITA) | 119 |
| 13 | Davide Cassani (ITA) | 111 |
| 14 | Massimo Ghirotto (ITA) | 109 |
| 15 | Erich Maechler (SUI) | 85 |
| 16 | Jørgen Pedersen (DEN) | 68 |
| 17 | Giancarlo Perini (ITA) | 102 |
| 18 | Eddy Schepers (BEL) | 30 |
| 19 | Urs Zimmermann (SUI) | AB-21 |
Directeur sportif: Davide Boifava

Hitachi–Marc–Rossin–Mavic
| No. | Rider | Pos. |
|---|---|---|
| 21 | Claude Criquielion (BEL) | 11 |
| 22 | Hendrik Devos (BEL) | AB-13 |
| 23 | Rudy Dhaenens (BEL) | AB-13 |
| 24 | Fabian Fuchs (SUI) | 51 |
| 25 | Jos Haex (BEL) | 71 |
| 26 | Patrick Jacobs (BEL) | AB-19 |
| 27 | Stefan Morjean (BEL) | 93 |
| 28 | Jean-Philippe Vandenbrande (BEL) | 76 |
| 29 | Jan Wijnants (BEL) | 121 |
Directeur sportif: Albert De Kimpe

Z–Peugeot
| No. | Rider | Pos. |
|---|---|---|
| 31 | Pascal Simon (FRA) | 53 |
| 32 | Frédéric Brun (FRA) | 92 |
| 33 | Bruno Cornillet (FRA) | 37 |
| 34 | Gilbert Duclos-Lassalle (FRA) | 80 |
| 35 | Jean-Louis Gauthier (FRA) | 134 |
| 36 | Gilbert Glaus (SUI) | AB-6 |
| 37 | Denis Roux (FRA) | 20 |
| 38 | Jérôme Simon (FRA) | 42 |
| 39 | Bruno Wojtinek (FRA) | AB-11 |
Directeur sportif: Roger Legeay

BH
| No. | Rider | Pos. |
|---|---|---|
| 41 | Anselmo Fuerte (ESP) | 8 |
| 42 | Francisco Antequera (ESP) | 117 |
| 43 | Philippe Bouvatier (FRA) | 66 |
| 44 | Laudelino Cubino (ESP) | AB-19 |
| 45 | Manuel Jorge Domínguez (ESP) | 118 |
| 46 | Federico Echave (ESP) | 12 |
| 47 | José Luis Navarro (ESP) | 113 |
| 48 | Francisco Rodríguez Maldonado (COL) | AB-19 |
| 49 | Guido Van Calster (BEL) | 31 |
Directeur sportif: Javier Mínguez

PDM
| No. | Rider | Pos. |
|---|---|---|
| 51 | Pedro Delgado (ESP) | 2 |
| 52 | Gerrie Knetemann (NED) | 89 |
| 53 | José Luis Laguía (ESP) | 43 |
| 54 | Jörg Müller (SUI) | 99 |
| 55 | Stefan Mutter (SUI) | AB-13 |
| 56 | Steven Rooks (NED) | AB-20 |
| 57 | Peter Stevenhaagen (NED) | 45 |
| 58 | Gert-Jan Theunisse (NED) | 148 |
| 59 | Adri van der Poel (NED) | 105 |
Directeur sportif: Jan Gijsbers

Système U
| No. | Rider | Pos. |
|---|---|---|
| 61 | Laurent Fignon (FRA) | 7 |
| 62 | Bernard Gavillet (SUI) | 57 |
| 63 | Martial Gayant (FRA) | 34 |
| 64 | Christophe Lavainne (FRA) | 40 |
| 65 | Marc Madiot (FRA) | 47 |
| 66 | Yvon Madiot (FRA) | 73 |
| 67 | Thierry Marie (FRA) | 87 |
| 68 | Charly Mottet (FRA) | 4 |
| 69 | Pascal Poisson (FRA) | 67 |
Directeur sportif: Cyrille Guimard

Reynolds–Seur–Sada
| No. | Rider | Pos. |
|---|---|---|
| 71 | Ángel Arroyo (ESP) | AB-19 |
| 72 | Dominique Arnaud (FRA) | AB-20 |
| 73 | Samuel Cabrera (COL) | NP-14 |
| 74 | Marc Gomez (FRA) | 79 |
| 75 | Julián Gorospe (ESP) | 83 |
| 76 | Rubén Gorospe (ESP) | AB-21 |
| 77 | Jesús Hernández Úbeda (ESP) | 108 |
| 78 | Miguel Induráin (ESP) | 97 |
| 79 | Ángel Ocaña (ESP) | AB-11 |
Directeur sportif: José Miguel Echavarri

Teka
| No. | Rider | Pos. |
|---|---|---|
| 81 | Reimund Dietzen (FRG) | 90 |
| 82 | Enrique Alberto Aja Cagigas (ESP) | 58 |
| 83 | Jesús Blanco Villar (ESP) | AB-15 |
| 84 | Eduardo Chozas (ESP) | 25 |
| 85 | Régis Clère (FRA) | 72 |
| 86 | Alfonso Gutiérrez (ESP) | NP-3 |
| 87 | Carlos Hernández Bailo (ESP) | 128 |
| 88 | Peter Hilse (FRG) | 106 |
| 89 | Jesús Rodríguez Magro (ESP) | 78 |
Directeur sportif: José Antonio González

Ryalco–Manzana–Postobón
| No. | Rider | Pos. |
|---|---|---|
| 91 | Pablo Wilches (COL) | AB-20 |
| 92 | Alberto Luis Camargo (COL) | AB-17 |
| 93 | Arsenio Chaparro Cardoso (COL) | AB-11 |
| 94 | Omar Hernández (COL) | 24 |
| 95 | Carlos Jaramillo (COL) | AB-20 |
| 96 | Gerardo Moncada (COL) | EL-21 |
| 97 | Néstor Mora (COL) | 63 |
| 98 | Pedro Saúl Morales (COL) | AB-13 |
| 99 | Óscar de Jesús Vargas (COL) | AB-20 |
Directeur sportif: José Raúl Meza

RMO–Meral–Mavic
| No. | Rider | Pos. |
|---|---|---|
| 101 | Patrice Esnault (FRA) | AB-19 |
| 102 | André Chappuis (FRA) | 123 |
| 103 | Thierry Claveyrolat (FRA) | AB-19 |
| 104 | Jean-Claude Colotti (FRA) | AB-16 |
| 105 | Paul Kimmage (IRL) | AB-21 |
| 106 | Gilles Mas (FRA) | 32 |
| 107 | Jean-François Rault (FRA) | 77 |
| 108 | Bernard Vallet (FRA) | 60 |
| 109 | Michel Vermote (BEL) | AB-13 |
Directeur sportif: Bernard Thévenet

Caja Rural–Orbea
| No. | Rider | Pos. |
|---|---|---|
| 111 | Marino Lejarreta (ESP) | 10 |
| 112 | Roque de la Cruz (ESP) | 52 |
| 113 | Mathieu Hermans (NED) | 135 |
| 114 | Pascal Jules (FRA) | 114 |
| 115 | Roland Le Clerc (FRA) | 107 |
| 116 | Jokin Mújika (ESP) | 41 |
| 117 | Erwin Nijboer (NED) | AB-21 |
| 118 | Pello Ruiz Cabestany (ESP) | AB-16 |
| 119 | José Salvador Sanchis (ESP) | 35 |
Directeur sportif: Domingo Perurena

Fagor
| No. | Rider | Pos. |
|---|---|---|
| 121 | Pedro Muñoz Machín Rodríguez (ESP) | 22 |
| 122 | Jean-Claude Bagot (FRA) | 33 |
| 123 | Jean-René Bernaudeau (FRA) | 17 |
| 124 | Éric Caritoux (FRA) | 23 |
| 125 | Martin Earley (IRL) | 65 |
| 126 | Robert Forest (FRA) | 38 |
| 127 | Frank Hoste (BEL) | AB-13 |
| 128 | François Lemarchand (FRA) | 75 |
| 129 | Sean Yates (GBR) | NP-24 |
Directeur sportif: Pierre Bazzo

Café de Colombia
| No. | Rider | Pos. |
|---|---|---|
| 131 | Luis Herrera (COL) | 5 |
| 132 | Rafaël Antonio Acevedo (COL) | 18 |
| 133 | Argemiro Bohórquez (COL) | 69 |
| 134 | Julio César Cadena (COL) | 46 |
| 135 | Juan Carlos Castillo (COL) | 36 |
| 136 | Marco Antonio León (COL) | 44 |
| 137 | Fabio Parra (COL) | 6 |
| 138 | Cristóbal Pérez (COL) | 101 |
| 139 | Martín Ramírez (COL) | 13 |
Directeur sportif: Rafael Antonio Niño

Superconfex–Kwantum–Yoko–Colnago
| No. | Rider | Pos. |
|---|---|---|
| 141 | Maarten Ducrot (NED) | NP-24 |
| 142 | Rolf Gölz (FRG) | 49 |
| 143 | Gert Jakobs (NED) | AB-19 |
| 144 | Jelle Nijdam (NED) | 124 |
| 145 | Ludo Peeters (BEL) | 96 |
| 146 | Luc Roosen (BEL) | 104 |
| 147 | Gerrit Solleveld (NED) | 127 |
| 148 | Jean-Paul van Poppel (NED) | 130 |
| 149 | Nico Verhoeven (NED) | HD-14 |
Directeur sportif: Jan Raas

Panasonic–Isostar
| No. | Rider | Pos. |
|---|---|---|
| 151 | Phil Anderson (AUS) | 27 |
| 152 | Erik Breukink (NED) | 21 |
| 153 | Theo de Rooij (NED) | 91 |
| 154 | Henk Lubberding (NED) | 95 |
| 155 | Robert Millar (GBR) | 19 |
| 156 | Guy Nulens (BEL) | 61 |
| 157 | Allan Peiper (AUS) | AB-21 |
| 158 | Eric Van Lancker (BEL) | 56 |
| 159 | Teun van Vliet (NED) | 84 |
Directeur sportif: Peter Post

Del Tongo–Colnago
| No. | Rider | Pos. |
|---|---|---|
| 161 | Giuseppe Saronni (ITA) | AB-13 |
| 162 | Silvano Contini (ITA) | 55 |
| 163 | Czesław Lang (POL) | AB-13 |
| 164 | Luciano Loro (ITA) | 15 |
| 165 | Lech Piasecki (POL) | AB-7 |
| 166 | Maurizio Piovani (ITA) | 120 |
| 167 | Alessandro Pozzi (ITA) | 81 |
| 168 | Alberto Saronni (ITA) | AB-13 |
| 169 | Ennio Vanotti (ITA) | EL-21 |
Directeur sportif: Pietro Algeri

Kas–Miko
| No. | Rider | Pos. |
|---|---|---|
| 171 | Sean Kelly (IRL) | AB-12 |
| 172 | Alfred Achermann (SUI) | 86 |
| 173 | Acácio da Silva (POR) | 64 |
| 174 | Iñaki Gastón (ESP) | AB-13 |
| 175 | Stephan Joho (SUI) | HD-3 |
| 176 | Luis Javier Lukin (ESP) | AB-14 |
| 177 | Javier Murguialday (ESP) | AB-7 |
| 178 | Celestino Prieto (ESP) | 100 |
| 179 | Gilles Sanders (FRA) | 28 |
Directeur sportif: Christian Rumeau

Joker–Emerxil–Eddy Merckx
| No. | Rider | Pos. |
|---|---|---|
| 181 | Marc Sergeant (BEL) | AB-19 |
| 182 | Beat Breu (SUI) | 26 |
| 183 | Michel Dernies (BEL) | 115 |
| 184 | Jan Goessens (BEL) | 131 |
| 185 | Jozef Lieckens (BEL) | 132 |
| 186 | Jan Nevens (BEL) | AB-20 |
| 187 | Peter Roes (BEL) | AB-14 |
| 188 | Frank Van De Vijver (BEL) | AB-13 |
| 189 | Wim Van Eynde (BEL) | 126 |
Directeur sportif: Walter Godefroot

7 Eleven–Hoonved
| No. | Rider | Pos. |
|---|---|---|
| 191 | Andrew Hampsten (USA) | 16 |
| 192 | Raúl Alcalá (MEX) | 9 |
| 193 | Jacques Boyer (USA) | 98 |
| 194 | Jeff Bradley (USA) | AB-11 |
| 195 | Ron Kiefel (USA) | 82 |
| 196 | Dag Otto Lauritzen (NOR) | 39 |
| 197 | Davis Phinney (USA) | NP-17 |
| 198 | Jeff Pierce (USA) | 88 |
| 199 | Bob Roll (USA) | AB-11 |
Directeur sportif: Mike Neel

Roland–Skala–Chiori–Colnago
| No. | Rider | Pos. |
|---|---|---|
| 201 | Dietrich Thurau (FRG) | NP-15 |
| 202 | John Bogers (NED) | HD-19 |
| 203 | Johan Capiot (BEL) | AB-11 |
| 204 | Herman Frison (BEL) | 122 |
| 205 | Rudy Patry (BEL) | 116 |
| 206 | Jesper Skibby (DEN) | 29 |
| 207 | Brian Holm (DEN) | 110 |
| 208 | Jacques van der Poel (NED) | HD-2 |
| 209 | Patrick Verschueren (BEL) | 125 |
Directeur sportif: Roger Swerts

Supermercati Brianzoli–Chateau d'Ax
| No. | Rider | Pos. |
|---|---|---|
| 211 | Vittorio Algeri (ITA) | AB-14 |
| 212 | Stefano Allocchio (ITA) | 129 |
| 213 | Roberto Amadio (ITA) | AB-14 |
| 214 | Giovanni Paolo Bottoia (ITA) | HD-14 |
| 215 | Claudio Corti (ITA) | NP-11 |
| 216 | Stefano Giuliani (ITA) | AB-1 |
| 217 | Milan Jurčo (CSK) | AB-19 |
| 218 | Dario Montani (ITA) | AB-19 |
| 219 | Gerhard Zadrobilek (AUT) | 14 |
Directeur sportif: Gianluigi Stanga

ANC–Halfords–Lycra
| No. | Rider | Pos. |
|---|---|---|
| 221 | Malcolm Elliott (GBR) | 94 |
| 222 | Bernard Chesneau (FRA) | HD-3 |
| 223 | Guy Gallopin (FRA) | 133 |
| 224 | Graham Jones (GBR) | AB-6 |
| 225 | Kvetoslav Palov (CSK) | 103 |
| 226 | Shane Sutton (AUS) | AB-13 |
| 227 | Stephen Swart (NZL) | AB-19 |
| 228 | Adrian Timmis (GBR) | 70 |
| 229 | Paul Watson (GBR) | AB-6 |
Directeur sportif: Phil Griffiths

=== By nationality ===
The 207 riders that competed in the 1987 Tour de France represented 21 different countries. Riders from nine countries won stages during the race; French riders won the largest number of stages.

| Country | No. of riders | Finishers | Stage wins |
|---|---|---|---|
| Australia | 3 | 1 | |
| Austria | 1 | 1 | |
| Belgium | 28 | 18 | 2 (Herman Frison, Marc Sergeant) |
| Canada | 1 | 1 | |
| Colombia | 20 | 11 | |
| Czechoslovakia | 2 | 1 | |
| Denmark | 4 | 4 | |
| France | 41 | 35 | 7 (Christophe Lavainne, Martial Gayant, Régis Clère ×2, Jean-François Bernard ×2, Laurent Fignon) |
| Ireland | 4 | 2 | 1 (Stephen Roche) |
| Italy | 18 | 9 | |
| Mexico | 1 | 1 | |
| Netherlands | 19 | 12 | 6 (Jelle Nijdam, Nico Verhoeven, Jean-Paul van Poppel ×2, Adri van der Poel, Erik Breukink) |
| New Zealand | 1 | 0 | |
| Norway | 1 | 1 | 1 (Dag Otto Lauritzen) |
| Poland | 2 | 0 | |
| Portugal | 1 | 1 | 1 (Acácio da Silva) |
| Spain | 30 | 20 | 4 (Manuel Jorge Domínguez, Pedro Delgado, Federico Echave, Eduardo Chozas) |
| Switzerland | 13 | 7 | |
| Great Britain | 6 | 3 | |
| United States | 7 | 4 | 2 (Davis Phinney, Jeff Pierce) |
| West Germany | 4 | 3 | 1 (Rolf Gölz) |
| Total | 207 | 135 | 25 (Note: The team time trial on stage 2, won by Carrera, is not counted in this total.) |
