= 1989 Vuelta a España, Stage 1 to Stage 11 =

Cycling race stages

The 1989 Vuelta a España was the 44th edition of the Vuelta a España, one of cycling's Grand Tours. The Vuelta began in A Coruña, with a stage on 24 April, and Stage 11 occurred on 4 May with a stage to Lleida. The race finished in Madrid on 15 May.

== Stage 1 ==
24 April 1989 — A Coruña to A Coruña, 20.1 km (12.5 mi)

Stage 1 result and general classification after Stage 1

Rank	Rider	Team	Time
1	Marnix Lameire (BEL)	AD Renting–W-Cup–Bottecchia	25' 18"
2	Gino De Bakker (BEL)	AD Renting–W-Cup–Bottecchia	s.t.
3	Stefano Allocchio (ITA)	Malvor–Sidi	s.t.
4	Ettore Pastorelli (ITA)	Carrera Jeans–Vagabond	s.t.
5	José Luis Navarro (ESP)	Seur	s.t.
6	Roberto Pagnin (ITA)	Malvor–Sidi	s.t.
7	René Beuker (NED)	Caja Rural	s.t.
8	Joachim Schlaphoff (FRG)	Viscontea	s.t.
9	José Luis Laguía (ESP)	Reynolds	s.t.
10	Erwin Nijboer (NED)	Caja Rural	s.t.

== Stage 2 ==
25 April 1989 — A Coruña to Santiago de Compostela, 209.2 km (130.0 mi)

Stage 2 result

Rank	Rider	Team	Time
1	Joaquín Hernández Hernández (ESP)	Seur	5h 45' 41"
2	Federico Echave (ESP)	BH	s.t.
3	Iñaki Gastón (ESP)	Kelme	s.t.
4	Malcolm Elliott (GBR)	Teka	+ 2"
5	Benny Van Brabant (BEL)	Lotus–Zahor	s.t.
6	José Luis Laguía (ESP)	Reynolds	s.t.
7	Thierry Laurent (FRA)	RMO	s.t.
8	Bruno Bonnet (FRA)	Carrera Jeans–Vagabond	s.t.
9	Álvaro Pino (ESP)	BH	s.t.
10	Jean-Claude Bagot (FRA)	RMO	s.t.

General classification after Stage 2

Rank	Rider	Team	Time
1	Benny Van Brabant (BEL)	Lotus–Zahor	6h 10' 57"
2	José Luis Laguía (ESP)	Reynolds	s.t.
3	José Luis Navarro (ESP)	Seur	s.t.
4	Thierry Laurent (FRA)	RMO	s.t.
5	Jesús Rodríguez Magro (ESP)	Reynolds	s.t.
6	Jean-Claude Bagot (FRA)	RMO	s.t.
7	Héctor Julio Patarroyo (COL)	Postobón–Manzana	s.t.
8	Marino Alonso (ESP)	Teka	s.t.
9	Deno Davie (GBR)	Carrera Jeans–Vagabond	s.t.
10	Peter Hilse (FRG)	Teka	s.t.

== Stage 3a ==
26 April 1989 — Vigo to Vigo, 34.4 km (21.4 mi) (TTT)

Stage 3a result

Rank	Team	Time
1	Caja Rural	42' 49"
2	Reynolds	+ 2"
3	Kelme	+ 11"
4	BH	+ 13"
5	Teka	+ 18"
6	Carrera Jeans–Vagabond	+ 24"
7	Malvor–Sidi	+ 32"
8	CLAS	+ 40"
9	RMO	+ 1' 00"
10	Seur	+ 1' 01"

General classification after Stage 3a

Rank	Rider	Team	Time
1	Roland Le Clerc (FRA)	Caja Rural	
2	José Luis Laguía (ESP)	Reynolds	+ 2"
3	Jesús Rodríguez Magro (ESP)	Reynolds	s.t.

== Stage 3b ==
26 April 1989 — Vigo to Ourense, 101 km (63 mi)

Stage 3b result

Rank	Rider	Team	Time
1	Malcolm Elliott (GBR)	Teka	2h 31' 02"
2	Eddy Planckaert (BEL)	AD Renting–W-Cup–Bottecchia	s.t.
3	Jean-Pierre Heynderickx (BEL)	Histor–Sigma	s.t.
4	Stefano Allocchio (ITA)	Malvor–Sidi	s.t.
5	Massimo Ghirotto (ITA)	Carrera Jeans–Vagabond	s.t.
6	Vladimir Muravski (URS)	Alfa Lum–STM	s.t.
7	Paulo de Oliveira Pinto (POR)	Sicasal–Acral	s.t.
8	Mathieu Hermans (NED)	Caja Rural	s.t.
9	Max Sciandri (GBR)	Viscontea	s.t.
10	Antonio Esparza (ESP)	Helios-CR	s.t.

General classification after Stage 3b

Rank	Rider	Team	Time
1	Roland Le Clerc (FRA)	Caja Rural	9h 24' 52"
2	José Luis Laguía (ESP)	Reynolds	+ 2"
3	Jesús Rodríguez Magro (ESP)	Reynolds	s.t.
4	William Palacio (COL)	Reynolds	s.t.
5	Omar Hernández (COL)	Kelme	+ 11"
6	Fernando Quevedo (ESP)	BH	+ 13"
7	Philippe Bouvatier (FRA)	BH	s.t.
8	Guillermo Arenas (ESP)	Caja Rural	+ 15"
9	Dominique Arnaud (FRA)	Reynolds	+ 17"
10	Marino Alonso (ESP)	Teka	+ 18"

== Stage 4 ==
27 April 1989 — Ourense to Pontevedra, 160.5 km (99.7 mi)

Stage 4 result

Rank	Rider	Team	Time
1	Roberto Pagnin (ITA)	Malvor–Sidi	4h 10' 55"
2	William Pulido (COL)	Postobón–Manzana	s.t.
3	Américo José Neves Da Silva (POR)	CLAS	+ 6' 24"
4	José Luis Morán (ESP)	Lotus–Zahor	s.t.
5	Søren Lilholt (DEN)	Histor–Sigma	+ 6' 27"
6	Malcolm Elliott (GBR)	Teka	+ 6' 28"
7	Max Sciandri (GBR)	Viscontea	s.t.
8	Casimiro Moreda (ESP)	CLAS	s.t.
9	Herman Frison (BEL)	Histor–Sigma	s.t.
10	Paulo Jorge Silva (POR)	Sicasal–Acral	s.t.

General classification after Stage 4

Rank	Rider	Team	Time
1	Roland Le Clerc (FRA)	Caja Rural	13h 42' 15"
2	José Luis Laguía (ESP)	Reynolds	+ 2"
3	Jesús Rodríguez Magro (ESP)	Reynolds	s.t.
4	William Palacio (COL)	Reynolds	s.t.
5	Omar Hernández (COL)	Kelme	+ 11"
6	Fernando Quevedo (ESP)	BH	+ 13"
7	Philippe Bouvatier (FRA)	BH	s.t.
8	Guillermo Arenas (ESP)	Caja Rural	+ 15"
9	Dominique Arnaud (FRA)	Reynolds	+ 17"
10	Marino Alonso (ESP)	Teka	+ 18"

== Stage 5 ==
28 April 1989 — La Bañeza to Béjar, 247 km (153 mi)

Stage 5 result

Rank	Rider	Team	Time
1	Eddy Planckaert (BEL)	AD Renting–W-Cup–Bottecchia	5h 26' 13"
2	Joaquín Hernández Hernández (ESP)	Seur	s.t.
3	Manuel Jorge Domínguez (ESP)	BH	s.t.
4	Casimiro Moreda (ESP)	CLAS	s.t.
5	Malcolm Elliott (GBR)	Teka	s.t.
6	Omar Hernández (COL)	Kelme	s.t.
7	Miguel Ángel Iglesias (ESP)	Helios-CR	s.t.
8	Stefano Colagè (ITA)	Viscontea	s.t.
9	Brian Holm (DEN)	Histor–Sigma	s.t.
10	José Luis Laguía (ESP)	Reynolds	s.t.

General classification after Stage 5

Rank	Rider	Team	Time
1	Roland Le Clerc (FRA)	Caja Rural	19h 08' 24"
2	José Luis Laguía (ESP)	Reynolds	+ 6"
3	William Palacio (COL)	Reynolds	s.t.
4	Jesús Rodríguez Magro (ESP)	Reynolds	s.t.
5	Omar Hernández (COL)	Kelme	+ 15"
6	Fernando Quevedo (ESP)	BH	+ 17"
7	Philippe Bouvatier (FRA)	BH	s.t.
8	Guillermo Arenas (ESP)	Caja Rural	+ 19"
9	Dominique Arnaud (FRA)	Reynolds	+ 21"
10	Marino Alonso (ESP)	Teka	+ 22"

== Stage 6 ==
29 April 1989 — Béjar to Ávila, 197.5 km (122.7 mi)

Stage 6 result

Rank	Rider	Team	Time
1	Luc Suykerbuyk (NED)	Lotus–Zahor	5h 19' 26"
2	Omar Hernández (COL)	Kelme	s.t.
3	José Martín Farfán (COL)	Café de Colombia	s.t.
4	Federico Echave (ESP)	BH	+ 52"
5	Mariano Sánchez Martinez (ESP)	Teka	s.t.
6	Jesús Rodríguez Magro (ESP)	Reynolds	s.t.
7	Pedro Saúl Morales (COL)	Kelme	s.t.
8	Peter Hilse (FRG)	Teka	s.t.
9	Gerardo Moncada (COL)	Postobón–Manzana	+ 2' 30"
10	Benny Van Brabant (BEL)	Lotus–Zahor	+ 2' 59"

General classification after Stage 6

Rank	Rider	Team	Time
1	Omar Hernández (COL)	Kelme	24h 27' 55"
2	Jesús Rodríguez Magro (ESP)	Reynolds	+ 53"
3	Peter Hilse (FRG)	Teka	+ 1' 09"
4	Mariano Sánchez Martinez (ESP)	Teka	+ 1' 24"
5	Federico Echave (ESP)	BH	+ 1' 32"
6	Pedro Saúl Morales (COL)	Kelme	s.t.
7	José Martín Farfán (COL)	Café de Colombia	+ 2' 03"
8	Luc Suykerbuyk (NED)	Lotus–Zahor	+ 2' 05"
9	Roland Le Clerc (FRA)	Caja Rural	+ 2' 54"
10	José Luis Laguía (ESP)	Reynolds	+ 3' 00"

== Stage 7 ==
30 April 1989 — Ávila to Toledo, 160 km (99 mi)

Stage 7 result

Rank	Rider	Team	Time
1	Massimo Ghirotto (ITA)	Carrera Jeans–Vagabond	3h 27' 30"
2	Mathieu Hermans (NED)	Caja Rural	+ 1"
3	José Luis Laguía (ESP)	Reynolds	+ 2"
4	Bruno Bonnet (FRA)	Carrera Jeans–Vagabond	s.t.
5	José Luis Villanueva (ESP)	ONCE	+ 4"
6	Manuel Jorge Domínguez (ESP)	BH	+ 6"
7	Benny Van Brabant (BEL)	Lotus–Zahor	s.t.
8	Casimiro Moreda (ESP)	CLAS	s.t.
9	Malcolm Elliott (GBR)	Teka	s.t.
10	Antonio Esparza (ESP)	Helios-CR	s.t.

General classification after Stage 7

Rank	Rider	Team	Time
1	Omar Hernández (COL)	Kelme	27h 55' 31"
2	Jesús Rodríguez Magro (ESP)	Reynolds	+ 53"
3	Peter Hilse (FRG)	Teka	+ 1' 09"
4	Mariano Sánchez Martinez (ESP)	Teka	+ 1' 24"
5	Federico Echave (ESP)	BH	+ 1' 32"
6	Pedro Saúl Morales (COL)	Kelme	s.t.
7	José Martín Farfán (COL)	Café de Colombia	+ 2' 03"
8	Luc Suykerbuyk (NED)	Lotus–Zahor	+ 2' 05"
9	Roland Le Clerc (FRA)	Caja Rural	+ 2' 54"
10	José Luis Laguía (ESP)	Reynolds	+ 2' 56"

== Stage 8 ==
1 May 1989 — Toledo to Albacete, 235.5 km (146.3 mi)

Stage 8 result

Rank	Rider	Team	Time
1	Stefano Allocchio (ITA)	Malvor–Sidi	5h 44' 44"
2	Casimiro Moreda (ESP)	CLAS	s.t.
3	Eddy Planckaert (BEL)	AD Renting–W-Cup–Bottecchia	s.t.
4	Joaquín Hernández Hernández (ESP)	Seur	s.t.
5	Marnix Lameire (BEL)	AD Renting–W-Cup–Bottecchia	s.t.
6	Antonio Esparza (ESP)	Helios-CR	s.t.
7	Mathieu Hermans (NED)	Caja Rural	s.t.
8	Stéphane Guay (FRA)	Puertas Mavisa	s.t.
9	Jean-Pierre Heynderickx (BEL)	Histor–Sigma	s.t.
10	Américo José Neves Da Silva (POR)	CLAS	s.t.

General classification after Stage 8

Rank	Rider	Team	Time
1	Omar Hernández (COL)	Kelme	33h 40' 15"
2	Jesús Rodríguez Magro (ESP)	Reynolds	+ 53"
3	Peter Hilse (FRG)	Teka	+ 1' 09"
4	Mariano Sánchez Martinez (ESP)	Teka	+ 1' 24"
5	Federico Echave (ESP)	BH	+ 1' 32"
6	Pedro Saúl Morales (COL)	Kelme	s.t.
7	José Martín Farfán (COL)	Café de Colombia	+ 2' 03"
8	Luc Suykerbuyk (NED)	Lotus–Zahor	+ 2' 05"
9	Roland Le Clerc (FRA)	Caja Rural	+ 2' 54"
10	José Luis Laguía (ESP)	Reynolds	+ 2' 56"

== Stage 9 ==
2 May 1989 — Albacete to Gandia, 228.1 km (141.7 mi)

Stage 9 result

Rank	Rider	Team	Time
1	Reimund Dietzen (FRG)	Teka	5h 26' 26"
2	Javier Murguialday (ESP)	BH	s.t.
3	Massimo Ghirotto (ITA)	Carrera Jeans–Vagabond	s.t.
4	Jesús Blanco Villar (ESP)	Seur	s.t.
5	Pello Ruiz Cabestany (ESP)	ONCE	s.t.
6	Miguel Ángel Iglesias (ESP)	Helios-CR	s.t.
7	Joaquín Hernández Hernández (ESP)	Seur	s.t.
8	Antonio Esparza (ESP)	Helios-CR	s.t.
9	Manuel Jorge Domínguez (ESP)	BH	s.t.
10	René Beuker (NED)	Caja Rural	s.t.

General classification after Stage 9

Rank	Rider	Team	Time
1	Omar Hernández (COL)	Kelme	39h 06' 51"
2	Peter Hilse (FRG)	Teka	+ 59"
3	Mariano Sánchez Martinez (ESP)	Teka	+ 1' 14"
4	Federico Echave (ESP)	BH	+ 1' 22"
5	Pedro Saúl Morales (COL)	Kelme	s.t.
6	José Martín Farfán (COL)	Café de Colombia	+ 1' 53"
7	Luc Suykerbuyk (NED)	Lotus–Zahor	+ 1' 55"
8	Roland Le Clerc (FRA)	Caja Rural	+ 2' 44"
9	José Luis Laguía (ESP)	Reynolds	+ 2' 46"
10	William Palacio (COL)	Reynolds	+ 2' 50"

== Stage 10 ==
3 May 1989 — Gandia to Benicàssim, 202.6 km (125.9 mi)

Stage 10 result

Rank	Rider	Team	Time
1	Herminio Díaz Zabala (ESP)	ONCE	5h 20' 28"
2	Antonio Esparza (ESP)	Helios-CR	s.t.
3	Vladimir Muravski (URS)	Alfa Lum–STM	s.t.
4	Brian Holm (DEN)	Histor–Sigma	s.t.
5	Joaquín Hernández Hernández (ESP)	Seur	s.t.
6	Malcolm Elliott (GBR)	Teka	s.t.
7	Bruno Bonnet (FRA)	Carrera Jeans–Vagabond	s.t.
8	Max Sciandri (GBR)	Viscontea	s.t.
9	Manuel Jorge Domínguez (ESP)	BH	s.t.
10	Iñaki Gastón (ESP)	Kelme	s.t.

General classification after Stage 10

Rank	Rider	Team	Time
1	Omar Hernández (COL)	Kelme	44h 27' 33"
2	Peter Hilse (FRG)	Teka	+ 59"
3	Mariano Sánchez Martinez (ESP)	Teka	+ 1' 14"
4	Federico Echave (ESP)	BH	+ 1' 22"
5	Pedro Saúl Morales (COL)	Kelme	s.t.
6	José Martín Farfán (COL)	Café de Colombia	+ 1' 53"
7	Luc Suykerbuyk (NED)	Lotus–Zahor	+ 1' 55"
8	Roland Le Clerc (FRA)	Caja Rural	+ 2' 44"
9	José Luis Laguía (ESP)	Reynolds	+ 2' 46"
10	William Palacio (COL)	Reynolds	+ 2' 50"

== Stage 11 ==
4 May 1989 — Vinaròs to Lleida, 179.8 km (111.7 mi)

Stage 11 result

Rank	Rider	Team	Time
1	Malcolm Elliott (GBR)	Teka	4h 21' 59"
2	Eddy Planckaert (BEL)	AD Renting–W-Cup–Bottecchia	s.t.
3	Marcel Arntz (NED)	Caja Rural	s.t.
4	Marnix Lameire (BEL)	AD Renting–W-Cup–Bottecchia	s.t.
5	Manuel Jorge Domínguez (ESP)	BH	s.t.
6	Stéphane Guay (FRA)	Puertas Mavisa	s.t.
7	Roberto Pagnin (ITA)	Malvor–Sidi	s.t.
8	René Beuker (NED)	Caja Rural	s.t.
9	Mathieu Hermans (NED)	Caja Rural	s.t.
10	Joaquín Hernández Hernández (ESP)	Seur	s.t.

General classification after Stage 11

Rank	Rider	Team	Time
1	Omar Hernández (COL)	Kelme	48h 49' 32"
2	Peter Hilse (FRG)	Teka	+ 59"
3	Mariano Sánchez Martinez (ESP)	Teka	+ 1' 14"
4	Federico Echave (ESP)	BH	+ 1' 22"
5	Pedro Saúl Morales (COL)	Kelme	s.t.
6	José Martín Farfán (COL)	Café de Colombia	+ 1' 53"
7	Luc Suykerbuyk (NED)	Lotus–Zahor	+ 1' 55"
8	Roland Le Clerc (FRA)	Caja Rural	+ 2' 44"
9	José Luis Laguía (ESP)	Reynolds	+ 2' 46"
10	William Palacio (COL)	Reynolds	+ 2' 50"
