= 1989 Vuelta a España, Stage 12 to Stage 22 =

Cycling race stages

The 1989 Vuelta a España was the 44th edition of the Vuelta a España, one of cycling's Grand Tours. The Vuelta began in A Coruña, with a stage on 24 April 1989, and Stage 12 from Lleida occurred on 5 May 1989. The race finished in Madrid on 15 May 1989.

== Stage 12 ==
5 May 1989 — Lleida to Cerler, 186.5 km (115.9 mi)

Stage 12 result

Rank	Rider	Team	Time
1	Pedro Delgado (ESP)	Reynolds	5h 28' 23"
2	Pedro Saúl Morales (COL)	Kelme	s.t.
3	Óscar Vargas (COL)	Postobón–Manzana	s.t.
4	Fabio Parra (COL)	Kelme	s.t.
5	Gerardo Moncada (COL)	Postobón–Manzana	+ 1"
6	Ángel Ocaña (ESP)	Lotus–Zahor	+ 18"
7	Miguel Induráin (ESP)	Reynolds	+ 46"
8	Reimund Dietzen (FRG)	Teka	s.t.
9	Iñaki Gastón (ESP)	Kelme	s.t.
10	Carlos Jaramillo (COL)	Postobón–Manzana	s.t.

General classification after Stage 12

Rank	Rider	Team	Time
1	Omar Hernández (COL)	Kelme	54h 19' 00"
2	Pedro Saúl Morales (COL)	Kelme	+ 17"
3	Federico Echave (ESP)	BH	+ 1' 03"
4	José Martín Farfán (COL)	Café de Colombia	+ 1' 34"
5	Pedro Delgado (ESP)	Reynolds	+ 2' 15"
6	Peter Hilse (FRG)	Teka	+ 2' 16"
7	Fabio Parra (COL)	Kelme	+ 2' 24"
8	Gerardo Moncada (COL)	Postobón–Manzana	+ 2' 38"
9	Miguel Induráin (ESP)	Reynolds	+ 2' 59"
10	Iñaki Gastón (ESP)	Kelme	+ 3' 06"

== Stage 13 ==
6 May 1989 — Benasque to Jaca, 160.8 km (99.9 mi)

Stage 13 result

Rank	Rider	Team	Time
1	Mathieu Hermans (NED)	Caja Rural	3h 54' 35"
2	Malcolm Elliott (GBR)	Teka	s.t.
3	Eddy Planckaert (BEL)	AD Renting–W-Cup–Bottecchia	s.t.
4	Miguel Ángel Iglesias (ESP)	Helios-CR	s.t.
5	Ricardo Martínez Matey (ESP)	Kelme	s.t.
6	Roberto Pagnin (ITA)	Malvor–Sidi	s.t.
7	Manuel Jorge Domínguez (ESP)	BH	s.t.
8	José Luis Laguía (ESP)	Reynolds	s.t.
9	Massimo Ghirotto (ITA)	Carrera Jeans–Vagabond	s.t.
10	Manuel De Sa Neves (POR)	Sicasal–Acral	s.t.

General classification after Stage 13

Rank	Rider	Team	Time
1	Omar Hernández (COL)	Kelme	58h 13' 35"
2	Pedro Saúl Morales (COL)	Kelme	+ 17"
3	Federico Echave (ESP)	BH	+ 1' 03"
4	José Martín Farfán (COL)	Café de Colombia	+ 1' 34"
5	Pedro Delgado (ESP)	Reynolds	+ 2' 15"
6	Peter Hilse (FRG)	Teka	+ 2' 16"
7	Fabio Parra (COL)	Kelme	+ 2' 24"
8	Gerardo Moncada (COL)	Postobón–Manzana	+ 2' 38"
9	Miguel Induráin (ESP)	Reynolds	+ 2' 59"
10	Iñaki Gastón (ESP)	Kelme	+ 3' 06"

== Stage 14 ==
7 May 1989 — Jaca to Zaragoza, 165.3 km (102.7 mi)

Stage 14 result

Rank	Rider	Team	Time
1	Mathieu Hermans (NED)	Caja Rural	3h 54' 35"
2	Marnix Lameire (BEL)	AD Renting–W-Cup–Bottecchia	s.t.
3	Malcolm Elliott (GBR)	Teka	s.t.
4	Jean-Pierre Heynderickx (BEL)	Histor–Sigma	s.t.
5	Manuel Jorge Domínguez (ESP)	BH	s.t.
6	Eddy Planckaert (BEL)	AD Renting–W-Cup–Bottecchia	s.t.
7	Stefano Colagè (ITA)	Viscontea	s.t.
8	Américo José Neves Da Silva (POR)	CLAS	s.t.
9	Antonio Esparza (ESP)	Helios-CR	s.t.
10	Vladimir Muravski (URS)	Alfa Lum–STM	s.t.

General classification after Stage 14

Rank	Rider	Team	Time
1	Omar Hernández (COL)	Kelme	62h 12' 54"
2	Pedro Saúl Morales (COL)	Kelme	+ 17"
3	Federico Echave (ESP)	BH	+ 1' 03"
4	José Martín Farfán (COL)	Café de Colombia	+ 1' 34"
5	Pedro Delgado (ESP)	Reynolds	+ 2' 15"
6	Peter Hilse (FRG)	Teka	+ 2' 16"
7	Fabio Parra (COL)	Kelme	+ 2' 24"
8	Gerardo Moncada (COL)	Postobón–Manzana	+ 2' 38"
9	Miguel Induráin (ESP)	Reynolds	+ 2' 59"
10	Iñaki Gastón (ESP)	Kelme	+ 3' 06"

== Stage 15 ==
8 May 1989 — Ezcaray to Valdezcaray, 24 km (15 mi) (ITT)

Stage 15 result

Rank	Rider	Team	Time
1	Pedro Delgado (ESP)	Reynolds	53' 22"
2	Ivan Ivanov (URS)	Alfa Lum–STM	+ 26"
3	José Martín Farfán (COL)	Café de Colombia	+ 39"
4	Anselmo Fuerte (ESP)	BH	+ 50"
5	Fabio Parra (COL)	Kelme	+ 52"
6	Óscar Vargas (COL)	Postobón–Manzana	+ 55"
7	Vladimir Poulnikov (URS)	Alfa Lum–STM	+ 1' 08"
8	Álvaro Pino (ESP)	BH	+ 1' 34"
9	Jaanus Kuum (NOR)	AD Renting–W-Cup–Bottecchia	+ 1' 36"
10	Miguel Induráin (ESP)	Reynolds	+ 1' 51"

General classification after Stage 15

Rank	Rider	Team	Time
1	José Martín Farfán (COL)	Café de Colombia	63h 08' 29"
2	Pedro Delgado (ESP)	Reynolds	+ 2"
3	Pedro Saúl Morales (COL)	Kelme	+ 34"
4	Federico Echave (ESP)	BH	+ 1' 01"
5	Fabio Parra (COL)	Kelme	+ 1' 03"
6	Anselmo Fuerte (ESP)	BH	+ 1' 45"
7	Óscar Vargas (COL)	Postobón–Manzana	+ 2' 08"
8	Ivan Ivanov (URS)	Alfa Lum–STM	+ 2' 17"
9	Omar Hernández (COL)	Kelme	+ 2' 19"
10	Miguel Induráin (ESP)	Reynolds	+ 2' 37"

== Stage 16 ==
9 May 1989 — Haro to Santoña, 193.6 km (120.3 mi)

Stage 16 result

Rank	Rider	Team	Time
1	Peter Hilse (FRG)	Teka	4h 44' 16"
2	Marco Giovannetti (ITA)	Seur	s.t.
3	Fernando Quevedo (ESP)	BH	s.t.
4	Jean-Pierre Heynderickx (BEL)	Histor–Sigma	+ 2"
5	Joaquín Hernández Hernández (ESP)	Seur	s.t.
6	Miguel Induráin (ESP)	Reynolds	s.t.
7	Pedro Delgado (ESP)	Reynolds	s.t.
8	Stefano Colagè (ITA)	Viscontea	s.t.
9	Jean-Claude Bagot (FRA)	RMO	s.t.
10	Pablo Moreno Rebollo (ESP)	Seur	s.t.

General classification after Stage 16

Rank	Rider	Team	Time
1	Pedro Delgado (ESP)	Reynolds	67h 52' 49"
2	Federico Echave (ESP)	BH	+ 59"
3	Fabio Parra (COL)	Kelme	+ 1' 01"
4	José Martín Farfán (COL)	Café de Colombia	+ 1' 10"
5	Anselmo Fuerte (ESP)	BH	+ 1' 43"
6	Pedro Saúl Morales (COL)	Kelme	+ 1' 44"
7	Óscar Vargas (COL)	Postobón–Manzana	+ 2' 06"
8	Ivan Ivanov (URS)	Alfa Lum–STM	+ 2' 15"
9	Miguel Induráin (ESP)	Reynolds	+ 2' 35"
10	Álvaro Pino (ESP)	BH	+ 3' 08"

== Stage 17 ==
10 May 1989 — Santoña to Lakes of Enol, 228 km (142 mi)

Stage 17 result

Rank	Rider	Team	Time
1	Álvaro Pino (ESP)	BH	6h 10' 03"
2	Óscar Vargas (COL)	Postobón–Manzana	+ 43"
3	Fabio Parra (COL)	Kelme	+ 48"
4	Iñaki Gastón (ESP)	Kelme	s.t.
5	Jon Unzaga (ESP)	Seur	+ 1' 31"
6	Federico Echave (ESP)	BH	+ 1' 32"
7	Ivan Ivanov (URS)	Alfa Lum–STM	s.t.
8	Pedro Saúl Morales (COL)	Kelme	+ 1' 47"
9	Pedro Delgado (ESP)	Reynolds	s.t.
10	Carlos Jaramillo (COL)	Postobón–Manzana	s.t.

General classification after Stage 17

Rank	Rider	Team	Time
1	Pedro Delgado (ESP)	Reynolds	74h 04' 39"
2	Fabio Parra (COL)	Kelme	+ 2"
3	Federico Echave (ESP)	BH	+ 44"
4	Óscar Vargas (COL)	Postobón–Manzana	+ 1' 02"
5	Álvaro Pino (ESP)	BH	+ 1' 21"
6	Anselmo Fuerte (ESP)	BH	+ 1' 43"
7	Pedro Saúl Morales (COL)	Kelme	+ 1' 44"
8	Ivan Ivanov (URS)	Alfa Lum–STM	+ 2' 00"
9	Miguel Induráin (ESP)	Reynolds	+ 3' 05"
10	Iñaki Gastón (ESP)	Kelme	+ 3' 39"

== Stage 18 ==
11 May 1989 — Cangas de Onís to Brañillín, 153.2 km (95.2 mi)

Stage 18 result

Rank	Rider	Team	Time
1	Ivan Ivanov (URS)	Alfa Lum–STM	4h 24' 32"
2	Pedro Delgado (ESP)	Reynolds	+ 20"
3	Álvaro Pino (ESP)	BH	+ 21"
4	Fabio Parra (COL)	Kelme	s.t.
5	Óscar Vargas (COL)	Postobón–Manzana	s.t.
6	Jean-Claude Bagot (FRA)	RMO	+ 43"
7	Pedro Saúl Morales (COL)	Kelme	+ 45"
8	Martín Ramírez (COL)	Café de Colombia	+ 51"
9	Jon Unzaga (ESP)	Seur	+ 1' 09"
10	Iñaki Gastón (ESP)	Kelme	+ 1' 12"

General classification after Stage 18

Rank	Rider	Team	Time
1	Pedro Delgado (ESP)	Reynolds	78h 29' 31"
2	Fabio Parra (COL)	Kelme	+ 3"
3	Óscar Vargas (COL)	Postobón–Manzana	+ 1' 03"
4	Álvaro Pino (ESP)	BH	+ 1' 22"
5	Ivan Ivanov (URS)	Alfa Lum–STM	+ 1' 40"
6	Federico Echave (ESP)	BH	+ 1' 51"
7	Pedro Saúl Morales (COL)	Kelme	+ 2' 09"
8	Iñaki Gastón (ESP)	Kelme	+ 4' 31"
9	Jean-Claude Bagot (FRA)	RMO	+ 5' 39"
10	Martín Ramírez (COL)	Café de Colombia	+ 7' 20"

== Stage 19 ==
12 May 1989 — León to Valladolid, 159.4 km (99.0 mi)

Stage 19 result

Rank	Rider	Team	Time
1	Mathieu Hermans (NED)	Caja Rural	3h 39' 17"
2	Malcolm Elliott (GBR)	Teka	s.t.
3	Eddy Planckaert (BEL)	AD Renting–W-Cup–Bottecchia	s.t.
4	Stéphane Guay (FRA)	Puertas Mavisa	s.t.
5	Roberto Pagnin (ITA)	Malvor–Sidi	s.t.
6	Vladimir Muravski (URS)	Alfa Lum–STM	s.t.
7	Jean-Pierre Heynderickx (BEL)	Histor–Sigma	s.t.
8	Stefano Allocchio (ITA)	Malvor–Sidi	s.t.
9	Antonio Esparza (ESP)	Helios-CR	s.t.
10	Manuel Jorge Domínguez (ESP)	BH	s.t.

General classification after Stage 19

Rank	Rider	Team	Time
1	Pedro Delgado (ESP)	Reynolds	82h 08' 48"
2	Fabio Parra (COL)	Kelme	+ 3"
3	Óscar Vargas (COL)	Postobón–Manzana	+ 1' 03"
4	Álvaro Pino (ESP)	BH	+ 1' 22"
5	Ivan Ivanov (URS)	Alfa Lum–STM	+ 1' 40"
6	Federico Echave (ESP)	BH	+ 1' 51"
7	Pedro Saúl Morales (COL)	Kelme	+ 2' 09"
8	Iñaki Gastón (ESP)	Kelme	+ 4' 31"
9	Jean-Claude Bagot (FRA)	RMO	+ 5' 38"
10	Martín Ramírez (COL)	Café de Colombia	+ 7' 20"

== Stage 20 ==
13 May 1989 — Valladolid to Medina del Campo (Destilerías DYC), 47.5 km (29.5 mi) (ITT)

Stage 20 result

Rank	Rider	Team	Time
1	Pedro Delgado (ESP)	Reynolds	1h 01' 00"
2	Federico Echave (ESP)	BH	+ 29"
3	Fabio Parra (COL)	Kelme	+ 54"
4	Luc Suykerbuyk (NED)	Lotus–Zahor	+ 1' 08"
5	Jaanus Kuum (NOR)	AD Renting–W-Cup–Bottecchia	+ 1' 12"
6	Juan Martínez Oliver (ESP)	Kelme	+ 1' 38"
7	Jesús Blanco Villar (ESP)	Seur	+ 1' 48"
8	Iñaki Gastón (ESP)	Kelme	+ 1' 53"
9	Roberto Pagnin (ITA)	Malvor–Sidi	+ 1' 55"
10	Helmut Wechselberger (AUT)	Caja Rural	s.t.

General classification after Stage 20

Rank	Rider	Team	Time
1	Pedro Delgado (ESP)	Reynolds	83h 09' 48"
2	Fabio Parra (COL)	Kelme	+ 57"
3	Federico Echave (ESP)	BH	+ 2' 20"
4	Óscar Vargas (COL)	Postobón–Manzana	+ 3' 09"
5	Álvaro Pino (ESP)	BH	+ 3' 24"
6	Ivan Ivanov (URS)	Alfa Lum–STM	+ 5' 00"
7	Iñaki Gastón (ESP)	Kelme	+ 6' 24"
8	Pedro Saúl Morales (COL)	Kelme	+ 7' 59"
9	Jean-Claude Bagot (FRA)	RMO	+ 8' 23"
10	Luc Suykerbuyk (NED)	Lotus–Zahor	+ 9' 46"

== Stage 21 ==
14 May 1989 — Collado Villalba to Palazuelos de Eresma (Destillerias DYC), 188.6 km (117.2 mi)

Stage 21 result

Rank	Rider	Team	Time
1	Alberto Camargo (COL)	Café de Colombia	5h 20' 02"
2	Fabio Parra (COL)	Kelme	s.t.
3	Omar Hernández (COL)	Kelme	+ 5"
4	Iñaki Gastón (ESP)	Kelme	+ 22"
5	Jon Unzaga (ESP)	Seur	s.t.
6	José Ignacio Moratinos Guerra (ESP)	Helios-CR	s.t.
7	Santos Hernández (ESP)	ONCE	s.t.
8	Óscar Vargas (COL)	Postobón–Manzana	s.t.
9	Luc Suykerbuyk (NED)	Lotus–Zahor	s.t.
10	Ivan Ivanov (URS)	Alfa Lum–STM	s.t.

General classification after Stage 21

Rank	Rider	Team	Time
1	Pedro Delgado (ESP)	Reynolds	88h 30' 12"
2	Fabio Parra (COL)	Kelme	+ 35"
3	Óscar Vargas (COL)	Postobón–Manzana	+ 3' 09"
4	Federico Echave (ESP)	BH	+ 3' 24"
5	Álvaro Pino (ESP)	BH	+ 4' 28"
6	Ivan Ivanov (URS)	Alfa Lum–STM	+ 5' 00"
7	Iñaki Gastón (ESP)	Kelme	+ 6' 24"
8	Pedro Saúl Morales (COL)	Kelme	+ 7' 59"
9	Jean-Claude Bagot (FRA)	RMO	+ 8' 23"
10	Luc Suykerbuyk (NED)	Lotus–Zahor	+ 9' 44"

== Stage 22 ==
15 May 1989 — Palazuelos de Eresma (Destillerias DYC) to Madrid, 177 km (110 mi)

Stage 22 result

Rank	Rider	Team	Time
1	Jean-Pierre Heynderickx (BEL)	Histor–Sigma	4h 31' 05"
2	Mathieu Hermans (NED)	Caja Rural	s.t.
3	Eddy Planckaert (BEL)	AD Renting–W-Cup–Bottecchia	s.t.
4	Stéphane Guay (FRA)	Puertas Mavisa	s.t.
5	Marnix Lameire (BEL)	AD Renting–W-Cup–Bottecchia	s.t.
6	Miguel Ángel Iglesias (ESP)	Helios-CR	s.t.
7	Vladimir Muravski (URS)	Alfa Lum–STM	s.t.
8	Manuel Jorge Domínguez (ESP)	BH	s.t.
9	Benny Van Brabant (BEL)	Lotus–Zahor	s.t.
10	Fabio Bordonali (ITA)	Malvor–Sidi	s.t.

General classification after Stage 22

Rank	Rider	Team	Time
1	Pedro Delgado (ESP)	Reynolds	93h 01' 17"
2	Fabio Parra (COL)	Kelme	+ 35"
3	Óscar Vargas (COL)	Postobón–Manzana	+ 3' 09"
4	Federico Echave (ESP)	BH	+ 3' 24"
5	Álvaro Pino (ESP)	BH	+ 4' 28"
6	Ivan Ivanov (URS)	Alfa Lum–STM	+ 5' 00"
7	Iñaki Gastón (ESP)	Kelme	+ 6' 24"
8	Pedro Saúl Morales (COL)	Kelme	+ 7' 59"
9	Jean-Claude Bagot (FRA)	RMO	+ 8' 23"
10	Luc Suykerbuyk (NED)	Lotus–Zahor	+ 9' 44"
