= List of teams and cyclists in the 1991 Vuelta a España =

For the 1991 Vuelta a España, the field consisted of 198 riders; 116 finished the race.

== By rider ==
Legend
No.	Starting number worn by the rider during the Vuelta
Pos.	Position in the general classification
DNF	Denotes a rider who did not finish

No.	Name	Nationality	Team	Pos.	Ref
1	Marco Giovannetti	Italy	Chateau d'Ax–Gatorade	18	
2	Giovanni Fidanza	Italy	Chateau d'Ax–Gatorade	116	
3	Mario Kummer	Germany	Chateau d'Ax–Gatorade	103	
4	Alberto Volpi	Italy	Chateau d'Ax–Gatorade	DNF	
5	Jan Schur	Germany	Chateau d'Ax–Gatorade	DNF	
6	Valerio Tebaldi	Italy	Chateau d'Ax–Gatorade	90	
7	Mario Scirea	Italy	Chateau d'Ax–Gatorade	106	
8	Mauro Santaromita	Italy	Chateau d'Ax–Gatorade	DNF	
9	Mario Manzoni	Italy	Chateau d'Ax–Gatorade	DNF	
11	Miguel Induráin	Spain	Banesto	2	
12	Julián Gorospe	Spain	Banesto	DNF	
13	Fabrice Philipot	France	Banesto	24	
14	Jesús Rodríguez Magro	Spain	Banesto	40	
15	Marino Alonso	Spain	Banesto	56	
16	Abelardo Rondón	Colombia	Banesto	38	
17	Jokin Mújika	Spain	Banesto	DNF	
18	José Ramón Uriarte	Spain	Banesto	DNF	
19	José Luis Santamaría	Spain	Banesto	DNF	
21	Jelle Nijdam	Netherlands	Buckler–Colnago–Decca	DNF	
22	Steven Rooks	Netherlands	Buckler–Colnago–Decca	9	
23	Eric Vanderaerden	Belgium	Buckler–Colnago–Decca	102	
24	Peter Winnen	Netherlands	Buckler–Colnago–Decca	DNF	
25	Gerrit de Vries	Netherlands	Buckler–Colnago–Decca	30	
26	Patrick Robeet	Belgium	Buckler–Colnago–Decca	DNF	
27	Dave Rayner	Great Britain	Buckler–Colnago–Decca	57	
28	Twan Poels	Netherlands	Buckler–Colnago–Decca	DNF	
29	Mario De Clercq	Belgium	Buckler–Colnago–Decca	DNF	
31	Guido Bontempi	Italy	Carrera Jeans–Tassoni	47	
32	Erich Maechler	Switzerland	Carrera Jeans–Tassoni	75	
33	Flavio Giupponi	Italy	Carrera Jeans–Tassoni	DNF	
34	Max Sciandri	Italy	Carrera Jeans–Tassoni	DNF	
35	Vladimir Poulnikov	Soviet Union	Carrera Jeans–Tassoni	66	
36	Mario Chiesa	Italy	Carrera Jeans–Tassoni	DNF	
37	Jure Pavlič	Yugoslavia	Carrera Jeans–Tassoni	54	
38	Felice Puttini	Switzerland	Carrera Jeans–Tassoni	79	
39	Christian Henn	Germany	Carrera Jeans–Tassoni	96	
41	Federico Echave	Spain	CLAS–Cajastur	4	
42	Iñaki Gastón	Spain	CLAS–Cajastur	14	
43	Pello Ruiz Cabestany	Spain	CLAS–Cajastur	6	
44	Alberto Leanizbarrutia	Spain	CLAS–Cajastur	44	
45	Arsenio González	Spain	CLAS–Cajastur	52	
46	Francisco Javier Mauleón	Spain	CLAS–Cajastur	21	
47	Manuel Jorge Domínguez	Spain	CLAS–Cajastur	80	
48	Ángel Camarillo	Spain	CLAS–Cajastur	DNF	
49	Víctor Gonzalo	Spain	CLAS–Cajastur	DNF	
51	Yuri Manuylov	Soviet Union	Lotus–Festina	86	
52	Acácio da Silva	Portugal	Lotus–Festina	65	
53	Jesús Blanco Villar	Spain	Lotus–Festina	36	
54	Roberto Torres	Spain	Lotus–Festina	89	
55	Romes Gainetdinov	Soviet Union	Lotus–Festina	55	
56	Carlos Hernández Bailo	Spain	Lotus–Festina	110	
57	Juan Tomás Martínez	Spain	Lotus–Festina	34	
58	Mathieu Hermans	Netherlands	Lotus–Festina	115	
59	Luc Suykerbuyk	Netherlands	Lotus–Festina	DNF	
61	Eddy Planckaert	Belgium	Panasonic–Sportlife	DNF	
62	Eric Van Lancker	Belgium	Panasonic–Sportlife	DNF	
63	Marc van Orsouw	Netherlands	Panasonic–Sportlife	50	
64	Olaf Ludwig	Germany	Panasonic–Sportlife	DNF	
65	Louis de Koning	Netherlands	Panasonic–Sportlife	DNF	
66	Marco Zen	Italy	Panasonic–Sportlife	DNF	
67	Eddy Bouwmans	Netherlands	Panasonic–Sportlife	41	
68	Henk Lubberding	Netherlands	Panasonic–Sportlife	97	
69	Jacques Hanegraaf	Netherlands	Panasonic–Sportlife	DNF	
71	Javier Carbayeda	Spain	Paternina–Don Zoilo	104	
72	Enrique Aja	Spain	Paternina–Don Zoilo	61	
73	Dick Dekker	Netherlands	Paternina–Don Zoilo	DNF	
74	René Beuker	Netherlands	Paternina–Don Zoilo	111	
75	José Luis Laguía	Spain	Paternina–Don Zoilo	DNF	
76	Iñaki Murua	Spain	Paternina–Don Zoilo	DNF	
77	Fernando Carvalho	Portugal	Paternina–Don Zoilo	DNF	
78	Alfonso Gutiérrez	Spain	Paternina–Don Zoilo	84	
79	Bernardo Mazon	Spain	Paternina–Don Zoilo	109	
81	Raúl Alcalá	Mexico	PDM–Concorde–Ultima	7	
82	Uwe Raab	Germany	PDM–Concorde–Ultima	43	
83	Tom Cordes	Netherlands	PDM–Concorde–Ultima	12	
84	John Talen	Netherlands	PDM–Concorde–Ultima	83	
85	Jean-Paul van Poppel	Netherlands	PDM–Concorde–Ultima	107	
86	John van den Akker	Netherlands	PDM–Concorde–Ultima	91	
87	John Vos	Netherlands	PDM–Concorde–Ultima	DNF	
88	Gert Jakobs	Netherlands	PDM–Concorde–Ultima	114	
89	Thomas Dürst	Germany	PDM–Concorde–Ultima	DNF	
91	Udo Bölts	Germany	Team Telekom	17	
92	Darius Kaiser	Germany	Team Telekom	73	
93	Carsten Wolf	Germany	Team Telekom	DNF	
94	Marcel Arntz	Netherlands	Team Telekom	85	
95	Bernd Gröne	Germany	Team Telekom	DNF	
96	Markus Schleicher	Germany	Team Telekom	DNF	
97	Erwin Nijboer	Netherlands	Team Telekom	DNF	
98	Urs Freuler	Switzerland	Team Telekom	DNF	
99	Dean Woods	Australia	Team Telekom	112	
101	Adri van der Poel	Netherlands	Tulip Computers	71	
102	Luc Roosen	Belgium	Tulip Computers	37	
103	Adrie Kools	Netherlands	Tulip Computers	DNF	
104	Rudy Rogiers	Belgium	Tulip Computers	DNF	
105	Jim Van De Laer	Belgium	Tulip Computers	32	
106	Rudy Patry	Belgium	Tulip Computers	DNF	
107	Olaf Jentzsch	Germany	Tulip Computers	DNF	
108	Michel Zanoli	Netherlands	Tulip Computers	DNF	
109	Peter Pieters	Netherlands	Tulip Computers	DNF	
111	Dimitri Konyshev	Soviet Union	TVM–Sanyo	DNF	
112	Vasily Zhdanov	Soviet Union	TVM–Sanyo	88	
113	Jesper Skibby	Denmark	TVM–Sanyo	28	
114	Jan Siemons	Netherlands	TVM–Sanyo	105	
115	Jörg Müller	Switzerland	TVM–Sanyo	101	
116	Scott Sunderland	Australia	TVM–Sanyo	DNF	
117	Sergei Uslamin	Soviet Union	TVM–Sanyo	77	
118	Thomas Barth	Germany	TVM–Sanyo	DNF	
119	Maarten Ducrot	Netherlands	TVM–Sanyo	113	
121	Laudelino Cubino	Spain	Amaya Seguros	15	
122	Fabio Parra	Colombia	Amaya Seguros	5	
123	Jesús Montoya	Spain	Amaya Seguros	23	
124	Javier Murguialday	Spain	Amaya Seguros	DNF	
125	Juan Romero	Spain	Amaya Seguros	68	
126	Roland Le Clerc	France	Amaya Seguros	62	
127	Patrice Esnault	France	Amaya Seguros	98	
128	Per Pedersen	Denmark	Amaya Seguros	DNF	
129	Francisco Antequera	Spain	Amaya Seguros	DNF	
131	Joaquim Llach	Spain	Artiach–Royal	DNF	
132	Mariano Sánchez	Spain	Artiach–Royal	DNF	
133	Vicente Ridaura	Spain	Artiach–Royal	DNF	
134	Juan Carlos Arribas	Spain	Artiach–Royal	87	
135	Américo Silva	Portugal	Artiach–Royal	74	
136	Carmelo Miranda	Spain	Artiach–Royal	49	
137	José Antonio Sánchez Valencia	Spain	Artiach–Royal	93	
138	Manuel Ángel Antón Renard	Spain	Artiach–Royal	82	
139	Eduardo Ruiz Santamaría	Spain	Artiach–Royal	DNF	
141	Oliverio Rincón	Colombia	Kelme–Ibexpress	10	
142	Néstor Mora	Colombia	Kelme–Ibexpress	29	
143	Hernán Buenahora	Colombia	Kelme–Ibexpress	DNF	
144	José Martín Farfán	Colombia	Kelme–Ibexpress	53	
145	Saúl Morales	Colombia	Kelme–Ibexpress	59	
146	Ramon Antonio Rota Muñoz	Spain	Kelme–Ibexpress	DNF	
147	Francisco Cabello	Spain	Kelme–Ibexpress	95	
148	Antonio Miguel Díaz	Spain	Kelme–Ibexpress	78	
149	Asiat Saitov	Soviet Union	Kelme–Ibexpress	DNF	
151	Miguel Ángel Iglesias	Spain	Puertas Mavisa	100	
152	Juan Carlos González	Spain	Puertas Mavisa	DNF	
153	Jesús Rodríguez Rodríguez	Spain	Puertas Mavisa	39	
154	Manuel Guijarro	Spain	Puertas Mavisa	94	
155	José Pedrero	Spain	Puertas Mavisa	58	
156	José Luis Morán	Spain	Puertas Mavisa	DNF	
157	Fernando Martínez de Guereñu Ochoa	Spain	Puertas Mavisa	20	
158	Rafael Lorenzana	Spain	Puertas Mavisa	DNF	
159	Juan Guillén	Spain	Puertas Mavisa	64	
161	Anselmo Fuerte	Spain	ONCE	DNF	
162	Marino Lejarreta	Spain	ONCE	3	
163	Eduardo Chozas	Spain	ONCE	11	
164	Herminio Díaz Zabala	Spain	ONCE	42	
165	Luis María Díaz De Otazu	Spain	ONCE	DNF	
166	Santos Hernández	Spain	ONCE	27	
167	Melcior Mauri	Spain	ONCE	1	
168	José Luis Villanueva	Spain	ONCE	60	
169	Johnny Weltz	Denmark	ONCE	48	
171	Pablo Moreno	Spain	Seur–Otero	DNF	
172	Malcolm Elliott	Great Britain	Seur–Otero	51	
173	Peter Hilse	Germany	Seur–Otero	81	
174	Jon Unzaga	Spain	Seur–Otero	16	
175	Viktor Klimov	Soviet Union	Seur–Otero	DNF	
176	Piotr Ugrumov	Soviet Union	Seur–Otero	8	
177	Ivan Ivanov	Soviet Union	Seur–Otero	19	
178	José Rodríguez	Spain	Seur–Otero	31	
179	José Salvador Sanchis	Spain	Seur–Otero	70	
181	Roberto Córdoba	Spain	Wigarma	DNF	
182	José Luis Navarro	Spain	Wigarma	DNF	
183	Jesús Cruz Martín	Spain	Wigarma	DNF	
184	Antonio Esparza	Spain	Wigarma	DNF	
185	Ángel Sarrapio	Spain	Wigarma	DNF	
186	José Enrique Carrera	Spain	Wigarma	DNF	
187	Juan José Martínez Fernández	Spain	Wigarma	92	
188	José Andrès Ripoll	Spain	Wigarma	76	
189	Francisco Ochaita	Spain	Wigarma	DNF	
191	Pascal Lino	France	RMO	35	
192	Thierry Claveyrolat	France	RMO	DNF	
193	Christophe Manin	France	RMO	46	
194	Frédéric Brun	France	RMO	63	
195	Jean-Philippe Dojwa	France	RMO	DNF	
196	Dante Rezze	France	RMO	DNF	
197	Mauro Ribeiro	Brazil	RMO	DNF	
198	Marcel Wüst	Germany	RMO	DNF	
199	Jean-Luc Jonrod	France	RMO	DNF	
201	Álvaro Mejía	Colombia	Ryalco–Postobón	22	
202	Óscar Vargas	Colombia	Ryalco–Postobón	DNF	
203	William Palacio	Colombia	Ryalco–Postobón	69	
204	Carlos Jaramillo	Colombia	Ryalco–Postobón	DNF	
205	Luis Herrera	Colombia	Ryalco–Postobón	13	
206	Gerardo Moncada	Colombia	Ryalco–Postobón	25	
207	Álvaro Sierra	Colombia	Ryalco–Postobón	33	
208	Omar Hernández	Colombia	Ryalco–Postobón	DNF	
209	Henry Cárdenas	Colombia	Ryalco–Postobón	26	
211	António Pinto	Portugal	Sicasal–Acral	DNF	
212	Edgar Corredor	Colombia	Sicasal–Acral	DNF	
213	Jorge Silva	Portugal	Sicasal–Acral	72	
214	Cássio Freitas	Brazil	Sicasal–Acral	45	
215	Pablo Rincon	Colombia	Sicasal–Acral	67	
216	Paulo Pinto	Portugal	Sicasal–Acral	DNF	
217	Carlos Araujo	Angola	Sicasal–Acral	DNF	
218	Serafim Vieira	Portugal	Sicasal–Acral	108	
219	Fernando Mota	Portugal	Sicasal–Acral	99	
