= 1988 Vuelta a Murcia =

Race details
- Dates: 1–6 March 1988
- Stages: 6
- Distance: 822 km (510.8 mi)
- Winning time: 20h 03' 40"

Results
| | Winner | Carlos Hernández Bailo (ESP) |
| | Second | William Palacio (COL) |
| | Third | Juan Tomás Martínez (ESP) |

The 1988 Vuelta a Murcia was the fourth edition of the Vuelta a Murcia cycle race and was held on 1 March to 6 March 1988. The race started in Mazarrón and finished in Murcia. The race was won by Carlos Hernández Bailo.

== General classification ==
Final general classification

| Rank | Rider | Time |
|---|---|---|
| 1 | Carlos Hernández Bailo (ESP) | 20h 03' 40" |
| 2 | William Palacio (COL) | + 19" |
| 3 | Juan Tomás Martínez (ESP) | + 19" |
| 4 | Guillermo Arenas (ESP) | + 1' 13" |
| 5 | Jaime Tomás (ESP) | + 1' 14" |
| 6 | Omar Hernández (COL) | + 1' 27" |
| 7 | Ángel Arroyo (ESP) | + 1' 28" |
| 8 | Mariano Sánchez Martinez (ESP) | + 1' 44" |
| 9 | Jokin Mújika (ESP) | + 1' 51" |
| 10 | Marino Alonso (ESP) | + 1' 56" |
