= Saronni =

Saronni is an Italian surname. Notable people with this name include the following:

- Alberto Saronni (born 1961), Italian cyclist
- Giuseppe Saronni (born 1957), Italian cyclist
