= Clásica de Sabiñánigo =

Annual bicycle race in Aragon, Spain (1969–2001)

Race details
- Region: Aragon, Spain
- Discipline: Road race
- Type: One-day race

History
- First edition: 1969
- Editions: 33
- Final edition: 2001
- First winner: Domingo Perurena (ESP)
- Most wins: Enrique Martínez Heredia (ESP) (3 wins)
- Final winner: Ángel Vicioso (ESP)

Clásica de Sabiñánigo was a road bicycle race held annually in Aragon, Spain from 1969 until 2001. The race was known as the Clásica Zaragoza-Sabiñanigo until 1992.

== Winners ==
Year	Winner	Second	Third
Clásica Zaragoza-Sabiñanigo
1969	(Spain) Domingo Perurena	(Spain) Santiago Lazcano	(Spain) Sebastián Fernández
1970	(Spain) Luis Zubero	(Spain) Domingo Perurena	(Spain) Vicente López Carril
1971	(Spain) Agustín Tamames	(Spain) Domingo Perurena	(Spain) José Manuel López
1972	(Spain) Segundo Goicoechea	(Spain) José Manuel López	(Spain) Pedro Torres Cruces
1973	(Spain) Antonio Martos	(Spain) Vicente López Carril	(Spain) Josep Pesarrodona
1974	(Spain) Miguel María Lasa	(Spain) Juan Santiago Zurano	(Spain) Manuel Esparza
1975	(Spain) Domingo Perurena	(Spain) Gonzalo Aja	(Spain) Fernando Plaza
1976	(Spain) Enrique Martínez Heredia	(Spain) Santiago Lazcano	(Spain) Vicente López Carril
1977	(Portugal) José Martins	(Spain) Enrique Martínez Heredia	(Spain) Andrés Gandarias
1978	(Spain) Enrique Martínez Heredia	(Spain) Antonio Menéndez	(Spain) Anastasio Grecian
1979	(Spain) Andrés Oliva	(Spain) Julián Andiano	(Spain) Alberto Fernández Blanco
1980	(Spain) José Luis Viejo	(Spain) Jose Lluís Laguía	(Spain) Imanol Murga
1981	(Spain) Enrique Martínez Heredia	(Spain) Eulalio García Pereda	(Spain) José Luis Rodríguez Inguanzo
1982	(Spain) Pedro Delgado	(Spain) Francisco Ramón Albelda	(Spain) Jaume Vilamajó
1983	(Spain) Eduardo Chozas	(Spain) Faustino Rupérez	(Spain) Ricardo Zúñiga
1984	(Spain) Alfonso Gutiérrez	(Spain) Miguel Ángel Iglesias	(Spain) Imanol Murga
1985	(Spain) Iñaki Gastón	(Spain) Josep Lluís Laguía	(Spain) Antonio Esparza
1986	(Spain) Mariano Sánchez	(Spain) Joaquín Faura	(Colombia) Óscar Vargas
1987	(Spain) Ángel Camarillo	(Australia) Stephen Hodge	(Spain) Melcior Mauri
1988	(Spain) Alfonso Gutiérrez	(Spain) Casimiro Moreda	(Spain) Jesús Suárez Cueva
1989	(Spain) Álvaro Pino (Note: Álvaro Pino was the sole finisher after the rest of the peloton stopped at a tunnel that they considered dangerous.)	Not awarded	Not awarded
1990	(Belgium) Jean-Pierre Heynderickx	(Spain) Juan Carlos González	(Spain) José Enrique Carrera
1991	(Belgium) Jerry Cooman	(Netherlands) Adrie van der Poel	(Belgium) Jean-Pierre Heynderickx
Clàsica de Sabiñánigo
1992	(Netherlands) Mathieu Hermans	(Belgium) Jerry Cooman	(United Kingdom) Malcolm Elliott
1993	(Spain) Asier Guenetxea	(Spain) Manuel Fernández Ginés	(Spain) Ángel Edo
1994	(Belgium) Serge Baguet	(Italy) Stefano Zanatta	(Belgium) Frank Vandenbroucke
1995	(Spain) Fernando Escartín	(Italy) Stefano Della Santa	(Germany) Gerd Audehm
1996	(Spain) Arsenio González	(Spain) Francisco José García	(Spain) David García Marquina
1997	(France) Armand de las Cuevas	(Spain) David Etxebarría	(Spain) César Solaun
1998	(Spain) Igor González de Galdeano	(France) Charles Guilbert	(Spain) Ginés Salmerón
1999	(Netherlands) Tristan Hoffman	(Germany) Andreas Klier	(United Kingdom) Jeremy Hunt
2000	(Italy) Davide Casarotto	(Italy) Gianni Faresin	(Italy) Paolo Lanfranchi
2001	(Spain) Ángel Vicioso	(Spain) Eleuterio Anguita	(Italy) Stefano Casagranda
