= 1989 Vuelta a España =

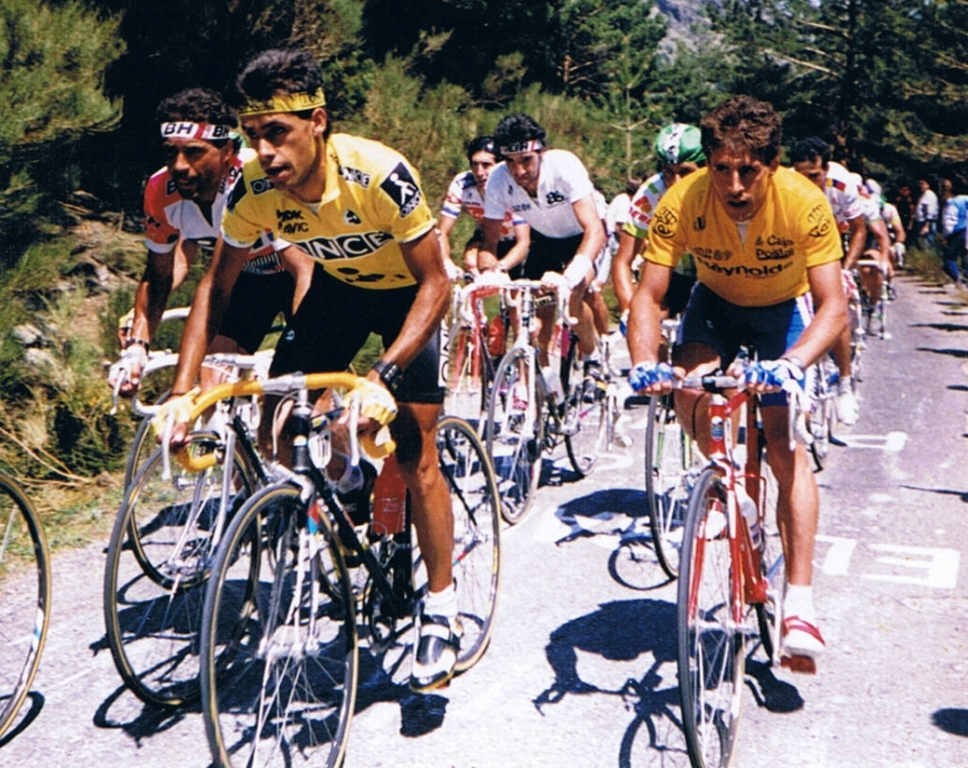
- Santos Hernandez (ONCE) and Pedro Delgado (Reynolds), during the race

Race details
- Dates: 24 April - 15 May
- Stages: 22
- Distance: 3,656 km (2,272 mi)
- Winning time: 93h 01' 47"

Results
Jersey awarded to the overall winner	Winner	Pedro Delgado (ESP)	(Reynolds)
	Second	Fabio Parra (COL)	(Kelme)
	Third	Óscar Vargas (COL)	(Postobón–Manzana)
Jersey awarded to the points classification winner	Points	Malcolm Elliott (GBR)	(Teka)
Jersey awarded to the mountains classification winner	Mountains	Óscar Vargas (COL)	(Postobón–Manzana)
Jersey awarded to the youth classification winner	Youth	Ivan Ivanov (USSR)	(Alfa Lum–STM)
Jersey awarded to the combination classification winner	Combination	Óscar Vargas (COL)	(Postobón–Manzana)
Jersey awarded to the sprints classification winner	Sprints	Miguel Ángel Iglesias (ESP)	(Helios-CR)
	Team	Kelme	

The 44th Edition Vuelta a España (Tour of Spain), a long-distance bicycle stage race and one of the 3 grand tours, was held from 24 April to 15 May 1989. It consisted of 22 stages covering a total of 3,656 km (2,272 mi), and was won by Pedro Delgado of the Reynolds cycling team. The route was released on 21 January 1989.

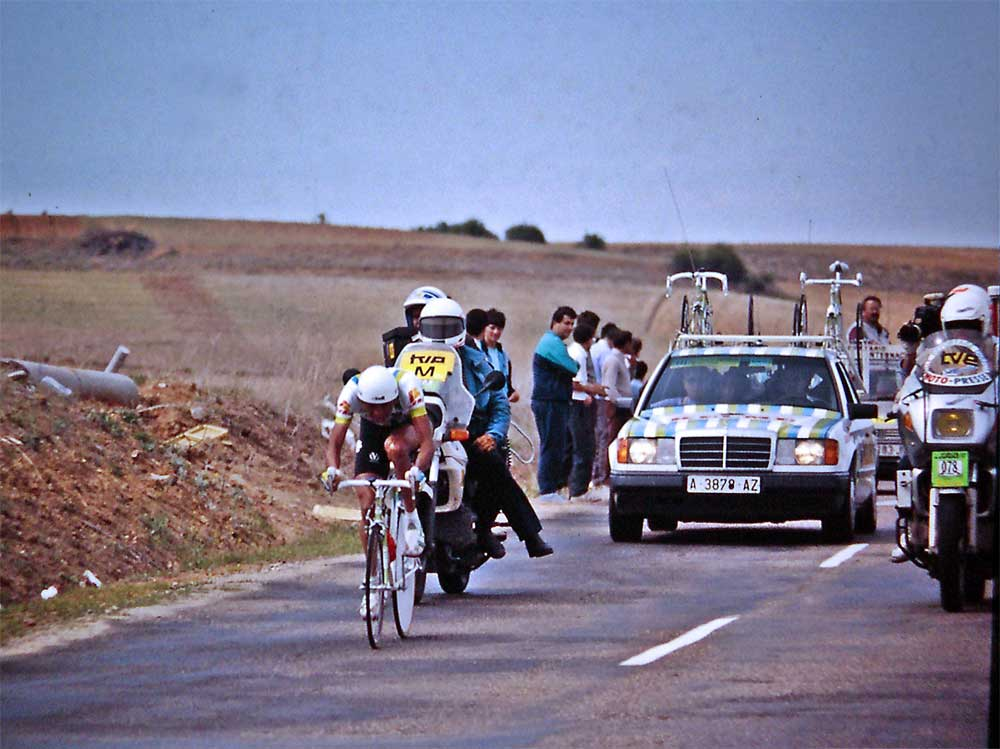
Fabio Parra during the final time trial from Valladolid to Medina del Campo where he started only 2 seconds behind Delgado

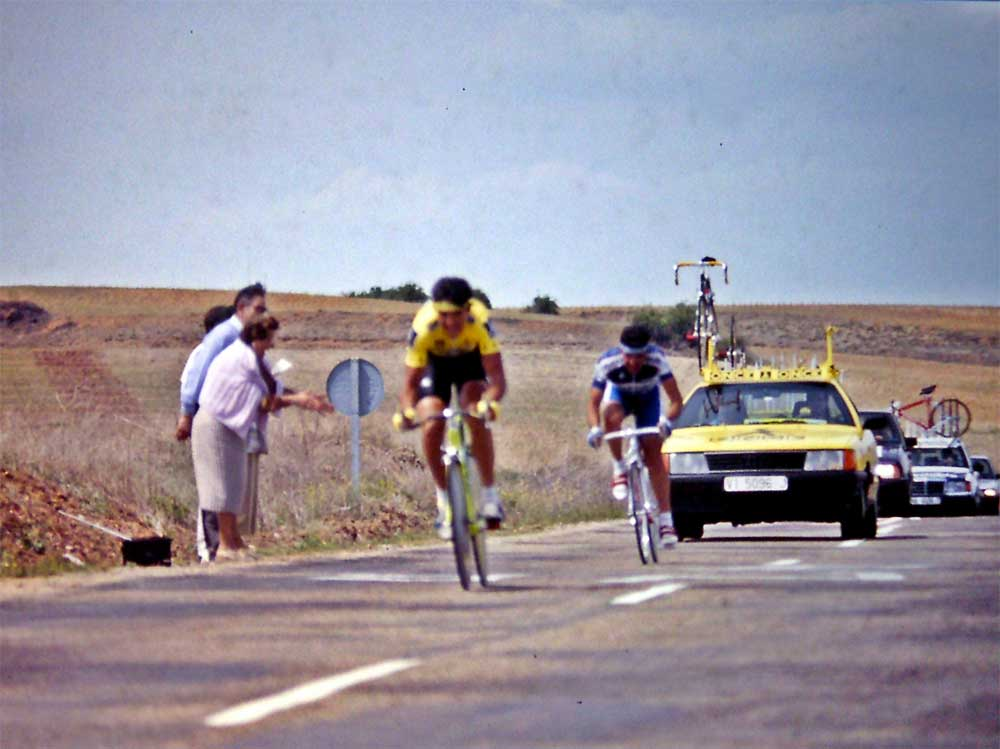
Pedro ‘Perico’ Delgado overtakes an opponent during the penultimate time trial

Pedro Delgado had won the previous Tour de France and was seen as the favourite for the race. Delgado came with a Reynolds team that contained Miguel Indurain, who had just won Paris–Nice and was also seen as a potential favourite. The first few days of the race saw the leaders jersey change shoulders from Marnix Lameire, Benny van Brabant and Roland LeClercq. The Colombian Omar Hernández took the lead on the sixth stage. On the 12th stage to Cerler, Delgado battled with four Colombians and won the stage. He won the stage 15 time trial, where Colombian Martin Farfan took the leader's jersey. On the following stage to Santander, Delgado took the jersey. However Delgado's team had a bad day several stages later, when Indurain fell and broke his wrist; Delgado had difficulty keeping the jersey from Fabio Parra. Parra was only two seconds behind Delgado on the general classification at one stage. The final time trial was the last chance for Parra to try to take the jersey from Delgado, but Delgado won and increased his lead to win his third grand tour.

== Route ==
List of stages
Stage	Date	Course	Distance	Type	Winner
1	24 April	A Coruña to A Coruña	21 km (13 mi)		Marnix Lameire (BEL)
2	25 April	A Coruña to Santiago de Compostela	222 km (138 mi)		Joaquín Hernández (ESP)
3a	26 April	Vigo to Vigo	35 km (22 mi)	Team time trial	Caja Rural
3b	26 April	Vigo to Ourense	105 km (65 mi)		Malcolm Elliott (GBR)
4	27 April	Orense to Pontevedra	163 km (101 mi)		Roberto Pagnin (ITA)
5	28 April	La Bañeza to Béjar	260 km (162 mi)		Eddy Planckaert (BEL)
6	29 April	Béjar to Ávila	195 km (121 mi)		Luc Suykerbuyk (NED)
7	30 April	Avila to Toledo	165 km (103 mi)		Massimo Ghirotto (ITA)
8	1 May	Toledo to Albacete	226 km (140 mi)		Stefano Allocchio (ITA)
9	2 May	Albacete to Gandia	194 km (121 mi)		Reimund Dietzen (FRG)
10	3 May	Gandia to Benicàssim	219 km (136 mi)		Herminio Díaz Zabala (ESP)
11	4 May	Vinaròs to Lleida	182 km (113 mi)		Malcolm Elliott (GBR)
12	5 May	Lleida to Cerler	190 km (118 mi)		Pedro Delgado (ESP)
13	6 May	Benasque to Jaca	164 km (102 mi)		Mathieu Hermans (NED)
14	7 May	Jaca to Zaragoza	166 km (103 mi)		Mathieu Hermans (NED)
15	8 May	Ezcaray to Valdezcaray	23 km (14 mi)	Individual time trial	Pedro Delgado (ESP)
16	9 May	Haro to Santoña	193 km (120 mi)		Peter Hilse (FRG)
17	10 May	Santoña to Lakes of Enol	225 km (140 mi)		Álvaro Pino (ESP)
18	11 May	Cangas de Onís to Brañillín	152 km (94 mi)		Ivan Ivanov (URS)
19	12 May	León to Valladolid	157 km (98 mi)		Mathieu Hermans (NED)
20	13 May	Valladolid to Medina del Campo	42 km (26 mi)	Individual time trial	Pedro Delgado (ESP)
21	14 May	Collado Villalba to Palazuelos de Eresma (Destillerias DYC)	187 km (116 mi)		Alberto Camargo (COL)
22	15 May	Palazuelos de Eresma (Destilerias DYC) to Madrid	179 km (111 mi)		Jean-Pierre Heynderickx (BEL)
	Total		3,656 km (2,272 mi)		

== Results ==
=== Final General Classification ===
Rank	Rider	Team	Time
1	(Spain) Pedro Delgado	Reynolds	93h 01' 47s
2	(Colombia) Fabio Parra	Kelme	+ 35s
3	(Colombia) Óscar Vargas	Postobón	+ 3' 09s
4	(Spain) Federico Echave	BH-Sport	+ 3' 24s
5	(Spain) Álvaro Pino	BH-Sport	+ 4' 28s
6	(Soviet Union) Ivan Ivanov	Alfa Lum	+ 5' 00s
7	(Spain) Iñaki Gastón	Kelme	+ 7' 24s
8	(Colombia) Pedro Saúl Morales	Kelme	+ 7' 59s
9	(France) Jean Claude Bagot	R.M.O.	+ 8' 23s
10	(Netherlands) Luc Suykerbuyk	Lotus-Zahor	+ 9' 44s
11	(Spain) Angel Ocana Perez	Lotus-Zahor	+ 12' 08s
12	(Colombia) Martín Ramírez	Café de Colombia	+ 12' 18s
13	(Colombia) Carlos Jaramillo	Postobón	+ 12' 41s
14	(Norway) Jaanus Kuum	AD Renting	
15	(Colombia) José Martín Farfán	Café de Colombia	
16	(Spain) Jesús Blanco Villar	Seur	
17	(Colombia) Héctor Patarroyo	Postobón	
18	(Spain) Pello Ruiz Cabestany	ONCE	
19	(Colombia) Gerardo Moncada	Postobón	
20	(Spain) Marino Lejarreta	Caja Rural-Orbea	
21	(Spain) Enrique Aja Cagigas	Teka	
22	(Spain) Javier Murguialday	BH Sport	
23	(Spain) Jon Unzaga Bombin	Seur	
24	(Spain) Eduardo Chozas Olmo	ONCE	
25	(France) Didier Virvaleix	Histor-Sigma	
