= 1995 Clásica de Almería =

Race details
- Dates: 28 February 1995
- Stages: 1
- Distance: 192 km (119.3 mi)
- Winning time: 5h 11' 53"

Results
	Winner	Jean-Pierre Heynderickx (BEL)
	Second	Jo Planckaert (BEL)
	Third	Edwig Van Hooydonck (BEL)

The 1995 Clásica de Almería was the 10th edition of the Clásica de Almería cycle race and was held on 28 February 1995. The race was won by Jean-Pierre Heynderickx.

== General classification ==
Final general classification

Rank	Rider	Time
1	Jean-Pierre Heynderickx (BEL)	5h 11' 53"
2	Jo Planckaert (BEL)	+ 0"
3	Edwig Van Hooydonck (BEL)	+ 0"
4	Johan Museeuw (BEL)	+ 0"
5	Asiat Saitov (RUS)	+ 0"
6	Fabio Casartelli (ITA)	+ 0"
7	José Antonio Espinosa (ESP)	+ 0"
8	Cezary Zamana (POL)	+ 0"
9	Eleuterio Anguita (ESP)	+ 0"
10	Americo Silva Neves (POR)	+ 0"
