= 1992 Dwars door België =

Race details
- Dates: 25 March 1992
- Stages: 1
- Distance: 200 km (124.3 mi)
- Winning time: 4h 46' 00"

Results
	Winner	Olaf Ludwig (GER)
	Second	Michel Zanoli (NED)
	Third	Jean-Pierre Heynderickx (BEL)

The 1992 Dwars door België was the 47th edition of the Dwars door Vlaanderen cycle race, held on 25 March 1992. The race started and finished in Waregem, and it was won by Olaf Ludwig.

== General classification ==
Final general classification

Rank	Rider	Time
1	Olaf Ludwig (GER)	4h 46' 00"
2	Michel Zanoli (NED)	+ 0"
3	Jean-Pierre Heynderickx (BEL)	+ 0"
4	Johan Museeuw (BEL)	+ 0"
5	Wilfried Nelissen (BEL)	+ 0"
6	Jan Bogaert (BEL)	+ 0"
7	Adri van der Poel (NED)	+ 0"
8	Jan Goessens (BEL)	+ 0"
9	Mario Traxl (AUT)	+ 0"
10	Marcel Wüst (GER)	+ 0"
