= Fabian Fuchs =

Swiss cyclist

Personal information
- Born: 20 December 1961 (age 64) Malters, Switzerland

Cycling career
- Sport: Cycling
- Role: Rider

Fabian Fuchs (born 20 December 1961) is a Swiss former professional racing cyclist. He rode in one edition of the Tour de France and three editions of the Giro d'Italia.
