= Dario Montani =

Italian cyclist

Personal information
- Born: 27 March 1961 (age 65) Walsall, England

Cycling career
- Sport: Cycling
- Role: Rider

Dario Montani (born 27 March 1961) is an Italian former professional racing cyclist. He rode in the 1987 Tour de France.
