= Bernard Chesneau =

French cyclist

Personal information
- Born: 5 May 1960 (age 66) Blois, France

Cycling career
- Sport: Cycling
- Role: Rider

Bernard Chesneau (born 5 May 1960) is a French former professional racing cyclist. He rode in the 1987 Tour de France.
