= Arsenio Chaparro Cardoso =

Colombian cyclist

Personal information
- Born: 4 February 1960 (age 66) Aquitania, Boyacá, Colombia

Cycling career
- Sport: Cycling
- Role: Rider

Arsenio Chaparro Cardoso (born 4 February 1960) is a Colombian former professional racing cyclist. He rode in two editions of the Tour de France.

== Tour de France ==
- 1987. Retired stage 11
