= Frank Van De Vijver =

Belgian cyclist

Personal information
- Born: 12 November 1962 (age 63) Bornem, Belgium

Cycling career
- Sport: Cycling
- Discipline: Road
- Role: Rider

Professional team
- 1986–1989: Lotto–Emerxil–Merckx

Frank Van De Vijver (born 12 November 1962) is a Belgian former professional racing cyclist. He rode in the 1987 Tour de France and won the Kampioenschap van Vlaanderen in 1986.
