= Rubén Gorospe =

Spanish cyclist

Personal information
- Born: 1 June 1964 (age 62) Mañaria, Spain

Cycling career
- Sport: Cycling
- Role: Rider

Rubén Gorospe (born 1 June 1964) is a Spanish former professional racing cyclist. He rode in one edition of the Tour de France, two editions of the Giro d'Italia and four editions of the Vuelta a España.
