= Jacques van der Poel =

Dutch cyclist

Personal information
- Born: 5 January 1963 (age 63) Hoogerheide, Netherlands

Cycling career
- Sport: Cycling
- Role: Rider

Jacques van der Poel (born 5 January 1963) is a Dutch former professional racing cyclist. He rode in the 1986 Giro d'Italia and the 1987 Tour de France. He is a brother of Adrie van der Poel and uncle of Mathieu van der Poel.
