= William Palacio =

Colombian cyclist

Personal information
- Born: 27 March 1965 (age 61) Cartago, Colombia

Cycling career
- Sport: Cycling
- Current team: Retired
- Discipline: Road
- Role: Rider

Professional teams
- 1986–1987: Café de Colombia–Varta
- 1988–1989: Reynolds
- 1990–1992: Postobón–Manzana–Ryalcao

William Palacio (born 27 March 1965) is a Colombian former racing cyclist. He rode in nine Grand Tours between 1988 and 1992 and competed in the individual pursuit and points race events at the 1984 Summer Olympics.

== Major results ==
1985
9th Overall Tour de l'Avenir
1986
3rd Overall Clásico RCN
1988
2nd Overall Vuelta a Murcia
9th Trofeo Masferrer
1990
8th Overall Vuelta a Colombia
1992
1st Stage 7 Critérium du Dauphiné Libéré
2nd Overall Vuelta a los Valles Mineros

=== Grand Tour general classification results timeline ===
Grand Tour	1988	1989	1990	1991	1992
Vuelta a España	12	30	39	69	17
Giro d'Italia	DNF	—	—	—	—
Tour de France	—	25	16	—	DNF
