= John Bogers =

Dutch cyclist

Personal information
- Born: 3 January 1964 (age 62) Budel-Schoot, Netherlands

Cycling career
- Sport: Cycling
- Role: Rider

John Bogers (born 3 January 1964) is a Dutch former professional racing cyclist. He rode in the 1987 Tour de France.
