= Jean-Pierre Heynderickx =

Belgian cyclist

Personal information
- Full name: Jean-Pierre Heynderickx
- Born: 5 May 1965 (age 61) Ghent, Belgium

Cycling career
- Sport: Cycling
- Current team: Red Bull–Bora–Hansgrohe
- Discipline: Road
- Role: Rider; Sports Director
- Rider type: Sprinter

Professional teams
- 1987: TeVe Blad–Eddy Merckx
- 1988–1989: Sigma–Fina
- 1990–1991: Seur
- 1992–1996: Collstrop–Garden Wood
- 1997–1998: Cédico–Ville de Charleroi

Managerial teams
- 2005–2010: Chocolade Jacques–T Interim
- 2012–2014: Lotto–Belisol
- 2015–2019: MTN–Qhubeka
- 2020–: Bora–Hansgrohe

Jean-Pierre Heynderickx (born 5 May 1965) is a Belgian former racing cyclist turned Sports director for Red Bull–Bora–Hansgrohe. He rode in the 1988 and 1990 Tour de France. After retiring in 1998 Heynderickx came back in 2005 as assistant director for Chocolade Jacques–T Interim. In 2019 he left Team Dimension Data for his current team.

== Major results ==
1987
1st GP Stad Vilvoorde
2nd Road race, National road championships
5th Circuit des XI Villes
10th Grand Prix Cerami
1988
1st Stage 4 Tour d'Armorique
4th Kuurne–Brussels–Kuurne
9th Paris–Tours
1989
1st Stage 22 Vuelta a España
4th Kuurne–Brussels–Kuurne
10th Le Samyn
1990
1st Clásica de Sabiñánigo
3rd Circuito de Getxo
1991
3rd Clásica de Sabiñánigo
5th Binche–Chimay–Binche
6th De Kustpijl
1992
3rd Dwars door België
4th Road race, National road championships
4th Scheldeprijs
4th Halle–Ingooigem
10th Grand Prix La Marseillaise
1993
1st Zomergem–Adinkerke
2nd Overall Étoile de Bessèges
4th Cholet-Pays de Loire
5th Tour de Vendée
7th Grand Prix de Fourmies
7th Brussels Cycling Classic
8th Grand Prix Impanis-Van Petegem
8th Paris–Tours
10th Dwars door België
1994
1st Stage 5 Étoile de Bessèges
2nd Memorial Rik Van Steenbergen
9th Overall Tour d'Armorique
9th Binche–Chimay–Binche
1995
1st Clásica de Almería
1st Zomergem-Adinkerke
3rd Paris–Bourges
5th Omloop van de Vlaamse Scheldeboorden
9th Road race, National road championships
9th De Kustpijl
9th Halle–Ingooigem
9th Grand Prix d'Isbergues
1996
2nd Binche–Chimay–Binche
4th Omloop van de Vlaamse Scheldeboorden
1997
4th Paris–Mantes-en-Yvelines
7th Tour de l'Eurométropole
1998
3rd Omloop van het Houtland
5th GP Stad Vilvoorde
5th Omloop van de Vlaamse Scheldeboorden
7th Grote Prijs Stad Zottegem

=== Grand Tour general classification results timeline ===
Grand Tour	1988	1989	1990	1991	1992
Vuelta a España	—	124	DNF	—	DNF
Giro d'Italia	Did not Compete				
Tour de France	148	—	DNF	—	—

Legend
—	Did not compete
DNF	Did not finish
