= Alberto Saronni =

Italian cyclist

Personal information
- Born: 19 November 1961 (age 64) Buscate, Italy

Cycling career
- Sport: Cycling
- Role: Rider

Alberto Saronni (born 19 November 1961) is an Italian former professional racing cyclist. He rode in the 1987 Tour de France.
