= Guillermo Arenas =

Spanish cyclist (born 1963)

Personal information
- Born: 22 February 1963 (age 63) Pola de Laviana, Spain

Cycling career
- Sport: Cycling
- Role: Rider

Guillermo Arenas (born 22 February 1963) is a Spanish former professional racing cyclist. He rode in the 1986 Tour de France.
