= Santos Hernández (cyclist) =

Spanish cyclist

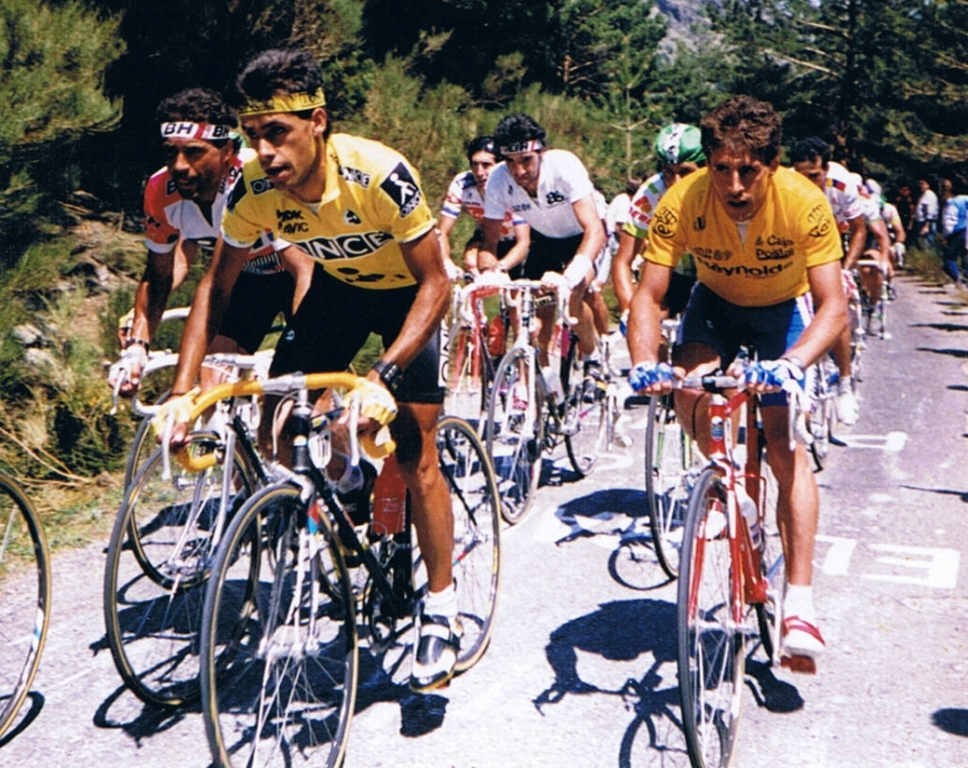
- Hernández (left) in the 1989 Vuelta a España.

Personal information
- Full name: Santos Hernández Calvo
- Born: 4 January 1967 (age 59) Madrid, Spain

Cycling career
- Sport: Cycling
- Current team: Retired
- Discipline: Road
- Role: Rider

Professional teams
- 1988: Kas–Canal 10
- 1989–1991: ONCE
- 1992: Artiach–Royal
- 1993: Eldor–Viner
- 1994–1995: ONCE
- 1996: W52–Paredes Móvel
- 1997–1998: Recer–Boavista

Santos Hernández Calvo (born 4 January 1967 in Madrid) is a Spanish former cyclist. He rode in 5 editions of the Vuelta a España and 3 editions of the Giro d'Italia.

== Major results ==
1987
1st Overall Vuelta a la Comunidad de Madrid
1989
1st Prologue Vuelta a Aragón
2nd Subida a Urkiola
1990
2nd Vuelta a Murcia
1993
5th Züri-Metzgete
1994
1st Stage 3 Vuelta a los Valles Mineros
