= Quino Hernández =

Spanish cyclist (born 1964)

Personal information
- Full name: Joaquín Hernández Hernández
- Born: 14 April 1964 (age 62) Castelldefels, Spain

Cycling career
- Sport: Cycling
- Current team: Retired
- Discipline: Road
- Role: Rider

Professional teams
- 1987–1988: Kelme
- 1989–1991: Seur

Joaquín Hernández Hernández (born 14 April 1964 in Castelldefels), known as Quino Hernández, is a Spanish former cyclist, who was professional from 1987 to 1991. He is best known for winning the second stage of the 1989 Vuelta a España.

== Major results ==
1983
1st Stage 3b Cinturón a Mallorca
1989
1st Stage 2 Vuelta a España
1st Stage 6 Volta ao Alentejo
1990
6th Overall Vuelta a la Comunidad Valenciana
7th Trofeo Masferrer
1991
6th GP Industria & Artigianato

=== Grand Tour general classification results timeline ===
Grand Tour	1987	1988	1989	1990
Giro d'Italia	—	—	—	—
Tour de France	—	—	—	—
Vuelta a España	82	—	56	57
