= Fernando Quevedo (cyclist) =

Spanish cyclist

Personal information
- Full name: Fernando Quevedo
- Born: 17 December 1964 (age 61) Madrid, Spain

Cycling career
- Sport: Cycling
- Role: Rider

Fernando Quevedo Salazar (born 17 December 1964) is a former Spanish racing cyclist. He finished in last place in the 1992 Tour de France.
