= Mathieu Hermans =

Dutch cyclist

Personal information
- Full name: Mathieu Hermans
- Born: 9 January 1963 (age 63) Goirle, the Netherlands

Cycling career
- Sport: Cycling
- Discipline: Road
- Role: Rider
- Rider type: Sprinter

Professional teams
- 1984–1989: Orbea–Danena
- 1990: Seur
- 1991–1992: Lotus–Festina
- 1993: TVM–Bison Kit

Major wins
- Grand Tours Tour de France 1 individual stage (1989) Vuelta a España 9 individual stages (1988, 1989)

Mathieu Hermans (born 9 January 1963 in Goirle) is a Dutch former professional road bicycle racer. Mathieu Hermans was the Lanterne rouge of the Tour de France twice, in 1987 and 1989. He won a stage in the 1989 Tour de France. Hermans was more successful in the Vuelta a España, where he won 9 stages in total.

== Major results ==
1981
1st Overall Grand Prix Rüebliland
1983
1st Stages 1 & 3 Triptyque Ardennais
1984
1st Ziklokross Igorre
1985
1st Stage 4 Vuelta a Castilla y León
2nd Circuito de Getxo
1986
1st Stage 3 Tour de Romandie
2nd Overall Vuelta a Aragón

1st Stages 2 & 7

8th Overall Vuelta a Andalucía
1987
1st Paris–Camembert
1st Stages 1, 2 & 6 Volta a la Comunitat Valenciana
3rd Trofeo Masferrer
4th Overall Ronde van Nederland

1st Stage 4

5th Scheldeprijs
5th Omloop van het Leiedal
1988
1st Profronde van Maastricht
1st Profronde van Oostvoorne
1st Trofeo Masferrer
Vuelta a España

1st Stages 3, 5, 6, 9, 15 & 20

1st GP San Froilan Lugo
1st GP Albacete
1st Stage 1, 2a & 2b Setmana Catalana de Ciclisme
1st Stages 1, 2, 3 & 4 Vuelta a Murcia
1st Stages 3 & 5 Volta a la Comunitat Valenciana
1st Stage 1 Volta a Catalunya
1st Stage 4 Ronde van Nederland
4th E3-Prijs Harelbeke
1989
1st Trofeo Luis Puig
1st Profronde van Pijnacker
1st Stage 11 Tour de France
Vuelta a España

1st Stages 12, 13 & 18

1st Stage 1 Tour de Luxembourg
1st Stage 1 Volta a Catalunya
3rd Veenendaal–Veenendaal
3rd Overall Tour de l'Oise
5th Tour of Flanders
8th Ronde van Limburg
9th E3-Prijs Harelbeke
9th Grand Prix Cerami
1990
1st Stage 2 Volta a Catalunya
1st Stage 5 Setmana Catalana de Ciclisme
1st Stage 6 Volta a la Comunitat Valenciana
1991
1st Stage 2 Vuelta a Asturias
1st Stage 5 Setmana Catalana de Ciclisme
1992
1st Circuito de Getxo
1st Clasica de Sabiñanigo
1st Stage 2a Setmana Catalana de Ciclisme
1st Stage 2 Vuelta a Murcia
1st Stage 1 Tour of Galicia
2nd Trofeo Masferrer
1993
7th Binche–Tournai–Binche

=== Grand Tour general classification results timeline ===
Grand Tour	1985	1986	1987	1988	1989	1990	1991	1992	1993
Giro d'Italia	—	—	DNF	—	—	—	DNF	—	—
Tour de France	—	DNF	135	147	138	DNF	—	—	—
Vuelta a España	67	—	—	105	140	DNF	115	DNF	DNF
