= Antonio Esparza =

Spanish cyclist (born 1962)

Personal information
- Born: 6 January 1962 (age 64) Sabadell, Spain

Cycling career
- Sport: Cycling
- Discipline: Road
- Role: Rider

Professional teams
- 1984–1985: Kelme
- 1986–1988: Seat–Orbea
- 1989: Helios–C.R.
- 1990: Puertas Mavisa
- 1991–1992: Wigarma

Antonio Esparza (born 6 January 1962) is a Spanish former professional racing cyclist. He rode in the 1986 Tour de France as well as in seven editions of the Vuelta a España.

== Major results ==
1985
1st Circuito de Getxo
1st Stage 5 Tour of Galicia
3rd Clásica de Sabiñánigo
5th Trofeo Masferrer
1986
1st Trofeo Masferrer
1987
Vuelta a España

1st Stages 9 & 15

1st Stage 1 Vuelta a los Valles Mineros
3rd Overall Vuelta a Castilla y León
1988
2nd Trofeo Masferrer
1989
1st Stage 2 Vuelta a Murcia
2001
2nd Overall Troféu Joaquim Agostinho
