= Luc Suykerbuyk =

Dutch cyclist

Personal information
- Born: 12 February 1964 (age 62) Nispen, Roosendaal, Netherlands

Cycling career
- Sport: Cycling
- Current team: Retired
- Discipline: Road
- Role: Rider

Professional teams
- 1987: Dormilon
- 1988: Zahor Chocolates
- 1989–1992: Lotus–Zahor

Luc Suykerbuyk (born 12 February 1964) is a Dutch former professional road cyclist.

== Major results ==
1985
1st Stage 5 Tour de Liège
1986
1st Overall Cinturón a Mallorca

1st Prologue

1988
2nd Overall Tour of the Basque Country

1st Stage 3

1989
3rd Overall Vuelta a Castilla y León
6th Overall Vuelta a Andalucía
10th Overall Vuelta a España

1st Stage 6

1990
1st Stage 4 Vuelta a Murcia
3rd Overall Route du Sud
8th Overall Grand Prix du Midi Libre
