= Óscar Vargas (cyclist) =

Colombian cyclist

Personal information
- Full name: Óscar de Jesús Vargas Restrepo
- Born: 23 March 1964 (age 62) Urrao, Antioquia, Colombia

Cycling career
- Sport: Cycling
- Discipline: Road
- Role: Rider; Directeur sportif

Professional teams
- 1985–1986: Kelme–Merckx
- 1987–1991: Postobón–Manzana
- 1992: Amaya Seguros
- 1993–1995: Aguardiente Antioqueño–Lotería de Medellín

Managerial teams
- 2014: GW–Shimano
- 2015–2019: Team Manzana Postobón

Major wins
- Grand Tours Vuelta a España Mountains classification (1989) Combination classification (1989)

Óscar de Jesús Vargas Restrepo (born 23 March 1964) is a Colombian former road racing cyclist, who was a professional rider from 1985 to 1995.

During the 1992 Vuelta a España, Vargas won stage 20, ahead of eventual overall winner Tony Rominger. However, he failed the subsequent doping test, returning a positive for caffeine, and was stripped of his result, with the stage win awarded to Rominger. He was given a three-month suspension.

== Major results ==
1985
5th Overall Clásico RCN
8th Overall Vuelta a Colombia
1986
1st Subida a Urkiola
3rd Clasica de Sabiñanigo
1987
5th Overall Vuelta a España
8th Overall Vuelta a Colombia
1989
1st Stage 7 Vuelta a Colombia
3rd Overall Vuelta a España

1st Mountains classification
1st Combination classification

1990
2nd Road race, National Road Championships
7th Overall Volta a Catalunya
1991
2nd Overall Vuelta a Colombia
4th Overall Clásico RCN
1992
~~1st Stage 20 Vuelta a España~~
9th Overall Paris–Nice
1993
3rd Overall Clásico RCN
1994
5th Overall Clásico RCN
6th Overall Vuelta a Colombia
1995
1st Overall Vuelta a Antioquia
3rd Road race, National Road Championships
8th Overall Clásico RCN

=== Grand Tour general classification results timeline ===
Grand Tour	1987	1988	1989	1990	1991	1992
Vuelta a España	5	DNF	3	DNF	DNF	45
Giro d'Italia	—	—	—	—	—	—
Tour de France	DNF	—	—	38	48	24

Legend
—	Did not compete
DNF	Did not finish
