= Federico Echave =

Spanish cyclist (born 1960)

Personal information
- Full name: Federico Echave Musatadi
- Born: July 20, 1960 (age 66) Kortezubi, Spain

Cycling career
- Sport: Cycling
- Discipline: Road
- Role: Rider
- Rider type: Climbing specialist

Professional teams
- 1982–1986: Teka
- 1987–1989: BH
- 1990–1993: CLAS–Cajastur
- 1994–1996: Mapei–CLAS

Major wins
- Grand Tours Tour de France 1 individual stage (1987) Vuelta a España 2 individual stages (1985, 1990) 1 TTT Stage (1988)

Federico Echave Musatadi (born 20 July 1960 in Kortezubi) is a Spanish former professional road bicycle racer. He won the prestigious stage up to Alpe d'Huez in 1987 Tour de France. Echave holds the record for most Vueltas finished, 14, all of them being consecutive.

== Major results ==
1981
2nd Circuito de Getxo
9th Klasika Primavera
10th Costa del Azahar
1982
1st Stage 1, Vuelta a Cantabria
1st GP Caboalles de Abajo
3rd Road race, National Road Championships
3rd GP Pascuas
6th Overall Vuelta a La Rioja
8th Clásica de San Sebastián
9th Trofeo Masferrer
1983
1st Stages 1 (ITT) & 2 (TTT), Vuelta a Asturias
8th Overall Vuelta a La Rioja

1st Stage 2 TTT

1984
1st Overall Vuelta a Burgos

1st Points classification
1st Stages 3 and 4a

6th Overall Ruota d'Oro

1st Stage 4

7th Overall

1st Stage 2 (TTT)

1985
1st Klasika Primavera
1st Stage 5, Vuelta a España
1st Stage 4, Vuelta a Andalucía
1st Stage 2, Volta a la Comunitat Valenciana
1st Prologue, Vuelta a los Valles Mineros
1st Stage 1, Volta a Galicia
6th Overall Vuelta a La Rioja

1st Stage 2

1986
1st Klasika Primavera
1st Stage 8, Volta a Catalunya
1st Stage 2, Vuelta a Cantabria
1987
1st Stage 20, Tour de France
1st Circuito de Getxo
3rd Clásica de San Sebastián
5th Overall Vuelta a Asturias

1st Stage 2

1988
1st Overall Vuelta a La Rioja

1st Mountain classification

1st Overall Vuelta a los Valles Mineros

1st Points classification
1st Stage 3

1st Stage 3 (TTT) Vuelta a España
2nd Overall Vuelta a Asturias

1st Stage 4

1989
1st Overall Vuelta a Castilla y León
1st Overall Bicicleta Eibarresa

1st Stage 1

2nd Overall Itzulia Basque Country

1st Points classification

4th Overall Vuelta a España
10th Overall Tour de l'Avenir
1990
1st Overall Tour of Galicia
5th Overall Giro d'Italia
5th Giro di Lombardia
6th Overall Vuelta a España

1st Stage 17

1991
1st Stage 3, Volta a la Comunitat Valenciana
4th Overall Vuelta a España
7th Overall Vuelta a Burgos
1992
1st Grand Prix des Amériques
1st Klasika Primavera
5th Overall Vuelta a España
6th Overall Volta Catalunya
1993
1st Stage 2, Tour of the Basque Country
1st Subida al Txitxarro
3rd Overall Vuelta a Mallorca

1st Stage 5

1996
9th Overall Tour DuPont

=== General classification results timeline ===
Grand Tour general classification results
Grand Tour	1981	1982	1983	1984	1985	1986	1987	1988	1989	1990	1991	1992	1993	1994	1995	1996
Vuelta a España	DNF	39	41	17	33	36	17	13	4	6	4	5	24	22	18	–
Giro d'Italia	–	–	–	–	–	–	–	–	–	5	13	–	–	–	–	–
Tour de France	–	–	–	39	–	38	12	25	DNF	–	–	DNF	23	34	–	40
