= Peter Hilse =

German cyclist (born 1962)

Personal information
- Born: 8 May 1962 (age 64) Freiburg im Breisgau, Germany

Cycling career
- Sport: Cycling
- Current team: Retired
- Discipline: Road
- Role: Rider

Professional teams
- 1985–1990: Teka
- 1991–1992: Seur–Otero

Peter Hilse (born 8 May 1962) is a former German racing cyclist. He won the German National Road Race in 1987. He rode in one Tour de France, six editions of the Vuelta a España and one Giro d'Italia. He won stage 16 of the 1989 Vuelta.

== Major results ==
1983
3rd Overall Flèche du Sud
9th Overall GP Tell
1984
2nd Overall GP Tell
1986
1st GP Villafranca de Ordizia
1st Barcelona-Andorra
2nd Overall Vuelta a Andalucía

1st Stages 3 & 5b (ITT)

3rd Klasika Primavera
1987
1st Road race, National Road Championships
1st Subida al Naranco
2nd Overall Setmana Catalana de Ciclisme

1st Stage 2

5th Overall Vuelta a Andalucía
1988
1st Stage 1 Troféu Joaquim Agostinho
2nd Klasika Primavera
7th Overall Paris–Nice
1989
1st Stage 16 Vuelta a España
1st Subida al Naranco
2nd Overall Vuelta a Castilla y León
3rd Overall Vuelta a Andalucía
9th Overall Vuelta a La Rioja
1990
1st Overall Vuelta a Cantabria
1st Stage 3 Vuelta a Burgos
1991
1st Stage 4 Vuelta a Andalucía
2nd Trofeo Comunidad Foral de Navarra
3rd Overall Volta a la Comunitat Valenciana
1992
8th Overall Vuelta a Andalucía
