= Iñaki Gastón =

Spanish cyclist (born 1963)

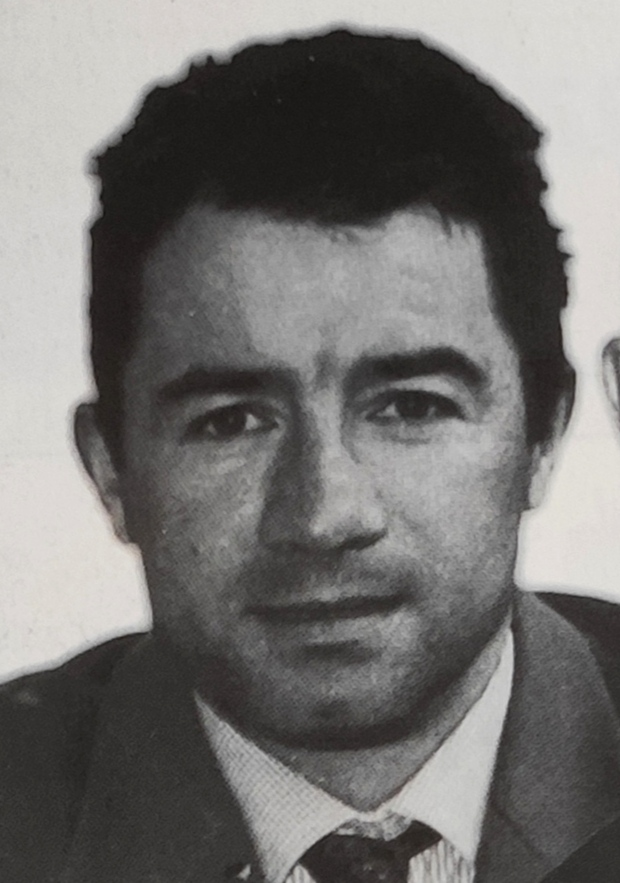

Personal information
- Full name: Iñaki Gastón Crespo
- Born: 25 May 1963 (age 63) Bilbao, Spain

Cycling career
- Sport: Cycling
- Discipline: Road
- Role: Rider
- Rider type: Climbing specialist

Professional teams
- 1984–1985: Reynolds
- 1986–1987: Kas
- 1988–1989: Kelme
- 1990–1993: CLAS–Cajastur
- 1994: Mapei–CLAS

Major wins
- Grand Tours Giro d'Italia Mountains classification (1991) Vuelta a España 3 individual stages (1987, 1988) One-day races and Classics Clásica de San Sebastián (1986)

Iñaki Gastón Crespo (born 25 May 1963, in Bilbao) is a Spanish former professional road bicycle racer.

== Career ==
During Gastón's first race as a professional the Volta a la Comunitat Valenciana he won stage 2b taking his first professional victory.

In the 1986 Clásica de San Sebastián Gastón made it to the line with Marino Lejarreta who he then beat in the sprint to win the race. He is one of two Basque riders to ever win the race.

Gastón won the 1990 Setmana Catalana de Ciclisme beating Tony Rominger by six seconds.

For the final year of his career his CLAS–Cajastur team merged with Mapei–Viner to form Mapei–CLAS for the 1994 season.

== Post-Cycling ==
Retiring from cycling after the 1994 season Gastón became a Pharmaceutical salesman. He plans to work until he is 60 then he will retire from work all together.

== Major results ==
1983
3rd Subida a Gorla
7th Overall GP Tell
1984
1st Clásica a los Puertos de Guadarrama
1st Overall Vuelta a La Rioja

1st Stages 1 & 3

1st Stage 2b Volta a la Comunitat Valenciana
2nd Overall Vuelta a los Valles Mineros
2nd Subida a Arrate
3rd Overall Escalada a Montjuïc
4th Overall Vuelta a Aragón

1st Stage 2b & 6

6th Clásica de San Sebastián
6th Overall Route du Sud
10th Giro di Lombardia
10th Overall Grand Prix du Midi Libre
1985
1st Subida a Arrate
1st Prueba Villafranca de Ordizia
1st Clásica de Sabiñánigo
2nd Overall Tour de l'Aude

1st Stage 3

2nd Clásica de San Sebastián
2nd Clásica a los Puertos de Guadarrama
3rd Overall Ruota d'Oro
3rd Klasika Primavera
6th Overall Tirreno–Adriatico
9th Overall Setmana Catalana de Ciclisme
1986
1st Clásica de San Sebastián
1st Subida a Arrate
2nd Trofeo Luis Puig
2nd Overall Vuelta a Burgos
3rd Overall Vuelta a Andalucía
5th Overall Setmana Catalana de Ciclisme
6th Overall Paris–Nice
6th Overall Tour of the Basque Country
1987
1st Overall Vuelta a Asturias

1st Prologue, Stages 1b, 2 & 3

1st Stage 8 Vuelta a España
2nd Overall Volta a Galicia

1st Stage 4b

2nd Overall Vuelta a La Rioja
2nd Grand Prix Navarre
3rd Overall Euskal Bizikleta

1st Stage 3

3rd Overall Volta a Catalunya
9th Paris–Nice
1988
Vuelta a España

1st Stages 2 & 14

1st Prologue Volta a Galicia
3rd Overall Setmana Catalana de Ciclisme

1st Stages 4 & 7

4th Road race, National Road Championships
7th Overall Vuelta a Aragón
1989
1st Overall Vuelta a Aragón
3rd Overall Volta a Galicia
5th Trofeo Masferrer
6th Overall Vuelta a La Rioja
6th Overall Euskal Bizikleta
7th Overall Vuelta a España
1990
1st Overall Setmana Catalana de Ciclisme
1st Klasika Primavera
2nd Overall Vuelta a Aragón

1st Stage 4

2nd Overall Vuelta a La Rioja
3rd Overall Escalada a Montjuïc
3rd Subida al Naranco
4th Overall Volta a Catalunya

1st Stage 5

4th Overall Tour of the Basque Country
4th Trofeo Luis Puig
5th Overall Vuelta a la Comunidad Valenciana
5th Overall Volta a Galicia
8th Züri-Metzgete
1991
1st Mountains classification Giro d'Italia
5th Clásica de San Sebastián
7th Overall Vuelta a Murcia
8th Overall Setmana Catalana de Ciclisme
9th La Flèche Wallonne
1992
2nd Overall Setmana Catalana de Ciclisme
3rd Klasika Primavera
1993
1st Stage 3 Setmana Catalana de Ciclisme
4th Clásica de San Sebastián
7th Subida al Naranco

=== Grand Tour general classification results timeline ===
| Grand Tour | 1985 | 1986 | 1987 | 1988 | 1989 | 1990 | 1991 | 1992 | 1993 | 1994 |
|---|---|---|---|---|---|---|---|---|---|---|
| Vuelta a España | 21 | 12 | 12 | 35 | 7 | 14 | 14 | DNF | 11 | 59 |
| Giro d'Italia | — | — | — | — | — | — | 23 | — | — | — |
| Tour de France | 38 | 75 | DNF | 112 | DNF | — | 61 | DNF | 78 | — |
