= Mariano Sánchez Martinez =

Spanish cyclist

Personal information
- Born: 1 February 1959 (age 67) Ibi, Spain

Cycling career
- Sport: Cycling
- Role: Rider

Mariano Sánchez Martinez (born 1 February 1959) is a Spanish former professional racing cyclist. He rode in one edition of the Tour de France and eight editions of the Vuelta a España.
