= Gerardo Moncada (cyclist) =

Colombian cyclist

Personal information
- Full name: Gerardo Moncada
- Born: 25 July 1962 (age 64) Chipatá, Colombia

Cycling career
- Sport: Cycling
- Discipline: Road
- Role: Rider

Professional team
- 1986–1994: Postobón–Manzana

Gerardo Moncada Guiza (born July 25, 1962 in Chipatá) is a Colombian former road cyclist, who was a professional from 1986 to 1994.

== Major results ==
1981
1st Overall Vuelta de la Juventud de Colombia
1989
9th Overall Setmana Catalana de Ciclisme
1993
6th Overall Vuelta a Colombia

1st Stage 2

=== Grand Tour general classification results timeline ===
Grand Tour	1986	1987	1988	1989	1990	1991	1992
Giro d'Italia	—	—	—	—	—	—	39
Tour de France	DNF	DNF	—	—	40	46	54
Vuelta a España	—	27	DNF	18	25	25	—
