= Pedro Saúl Morales =

Colombian cyclist (1959–2021)

Personal information
- Born: 1 October 1959 Samacá, Colombia
- Died: 24 March 2021 (aged 61)

Cycling career
- Sport: Cycling
- Role: Rider

Pedro Saúl Morales (1 October 1959 – 24 March 2021) was a Colombian racing cyclist. He rode in seven Grand Tours between 1987 and 1991.

He died on 24 March 2021 from a cardiac arrest.
