= 1987 Tour de France, Stage 13 to Stage 25 =

Cycling race stages

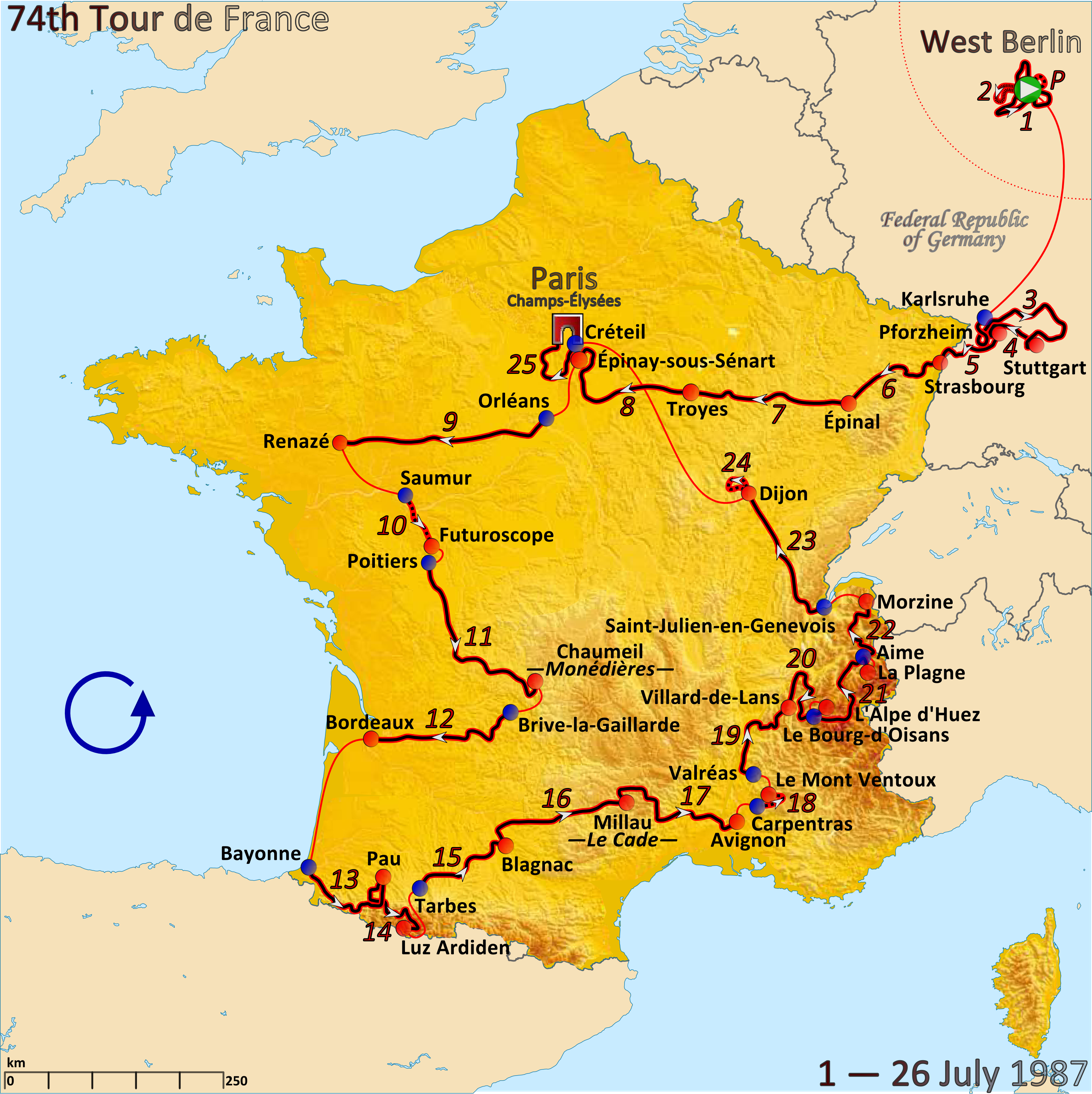
Route of the 1987 Tour de France

The 1987 Tour de France was the 74th edition of Tour de France, one of cycling's Grand Tours. The Tour began in West Berlin with a prologue individual time trial on 1 July and Stage 13 occurred on 13 July with a mountain stage from Bayonne. The race finished on the Champs-Élysées in Paris on 26 July.

== Stage 13 ==
13 July 1987 — Bayonne to Pau, 219 km (136.1 mi)

Stage 13 result

Rank	Rider	Team	Time
1	Erik Breukink (NED)	Panasonic–Isostar	6h 19' 56"
2	Jean-François Bernard (FRA)	Toshiba–Look–La Vie Claire	+ 6"
3	Pablo Wilches (COL)	Ryalco–Manzana–Postobón	+ 11"
4	Luis Herrera (COL)	Café de Colombia	+ 13"
5	Eric Van Lancker (BEL)	Panasonic–Isostar	+ 3' 45"
6	José Luis Laguía (ESP)	PDM	s.t.
7	Pedro Delgado (ESP)	PDM	s.t.
8	Thierry Claveyrolat (FRA)	RMO–Meral–Mavic	s.t.
9	Claude Criquielion (BEL)	Hitachi–Marc–Rossin–Mavic	s.t.
10	Niki Rüttimann (SUI)	Toshiba–Look–La Vie Claire	s.t.

General classification after stage 13

Rank	Rider	Team	Time
1	Charly Mottet (FRA)	Système U	56h 18' 53"
2	Jean-François Bernard (FRA)	Toshiba–Look–La Vie Claire	+ 1' 52"
3	Stephen Roche (IRL)	Carrera	+ 3' 23"
4	Erik Breukink (NED)	Panasonic–Isostar	+ 4' 42"
5	Marc Madiot (FRA)	Système U	+ 5' 55"
6	Pedro Delgado (ESP)	PDM	+ 6' 24"
7	Federico Echave (ESP)	BH	+ 6' 37"
8	Robert Millar (GBR)	Panasonic–Isostar	+ 6' 45"
9	Urs Zimmermann (SUI)	Carrera	+ 7' 13"
10	Raúl Alcalá (MEX)	7 Eleven–Hoonved	+ 7' 50"

== Stage 14 ==
14 July 1987 — Pau to Luz Ardiden, 166 km (103.1 mi)

Stage 14 result

Rank	Rider	Team	Time
1	Dag Otto Lauritzen (NOR)	7 Eleven–Hoonved	5h 14' 28"
2	Luis Herrera (COL)	Café de Colombia	+ 7"
3	Andrew Hampsten (USA)	7 Eleven–Hoonved	+ 53"
4	Pablo Wilches (COL)	Ryalco–Manzana–Postobón	+ 59"
5	Anselmo Fuerte (ESP)	BH	+ 1' 28"
6	Pedro Delgado (ESP)	PDM	+ 1' 30"
7	Robert Millar (GBR)	Panasonic–Isostar	s.t.
8	Jean-Claude Bagot (FRA)	Fagor	+ 1' 33"
9	Fabio Parra (COL)	Café de Colombia	s.t.
10	Stephen Roche (IRL)	Carrera	+ 1' 36"

General classification after stage 14

Rank	Rider	Team	Time
1	Charly Mottet (FRA)	Système U	61h 36' 54"
2	Jean-François Bernard (FRA)	Toshiba–Look–La Vie Claire	+ 1' 13"
3	Stephen Roche (IRL)	Carrera	+ 1' 26"
4	Pedro Delgado (ESP)	PDM	+ 4' 21"
5	Robert Millar (GBR)	Panasonic–Isostar	+ 4' 42"
6	Pablo Wilches (COL)	Ryalco–Manzana–Postobón	+ 5' 42"
7	Urs Zimmermann (SUI)	Carrera	+ 7' 29"
8	Raúl Alcalá (MEX)	7 Eleven–Hoonved	+ 8' 18"
9	Luis Herrera (COL)	Café de Colombia	+ 8' 34"
10	Andrew Hampsten (USA)	7 Eleven–Hoonved	+ 8' 44"

== Stage 15 ==
15 July 1987 — Tarbes to Blagnac, 164 km (101.9 mi)

Stage 15 result

Rank	Rider	Team	Time
1	Rolf Gölz (FRG)	Superconfex–Kwantum–Yoko–Colnago	3h 57' 59"
2	Roland Le Clerc (FRA)	Caja Rural–Orbea	s.t.
3	Martin Earley (IRL)	Fagor	+ 4"
4	Phil Anderson (AUS)	Panasonic–Isostar	+ 11' 47"
5	Peter Stevenhaagen (NED)	PDM	s.t.
6	Gerrie Knetemann (NED)	PDM	s.t.
7	Andrew Hampsten (USA)	7 Eleven–Hoonved	s.t.
8	Jos Haex (BEL)	Hitachi–Marc–Rossin–Mavic	s.t.
9	Steven Rooks (NED)	PDM	s.t.
10	Jean-René Bernaudeau (FRA)	Fagor	s.t.

General classification after stage 15

Rank	Rider	Team	Time
1	Charly Mottet (FRA)	Système U	65h 46' 40"
2	Jean-François Bernard (FRA)	Toshiba–Look–La Vie Claire	+ 2' 20"
3	Stephen Roche (IRL)	Carrera	+ 2' 33"
4	Pedro Delgado (ESP)	PDM	+ 4' 21"
5	Robert Millar (GBR)	Panasonic–Isostar	+ 5' 49"
6	Pablo Wilches (COL)	Ryalco–Manzana–Postobón	+ 6' 49"
7	Raúl Alcalá (MEX)	7 Eleven–Hoonved	+ 8' 18"
8	Luis Herrera (COL)	Café de Colombia	+ 8' 34"
9	Urs Zimmermann (SUI)	Carrera	+ 8' 36"
10	Andrew Hampsten (USA)	7 Eleven–Hoonved	+ 8' 44"

== Stage 16 ==
16 July 1987 — Blagnac to Millau, 216.5 km (134.5 mi)

Stage 16 result

Rank	Rider	Team	Time
1	Régis Clère (FRA)	Teka	5h 58' 21"
2	Raúl Alcalá (MEX)	7 Eleven–Hoonved	+ 14' 13"
3	Jean-François Bernard (FRA)	Toshiba–Look–La Vie Claire	+ 14' 14"
4	Stephen Roche (IRL)	Carrera	+ 14' 16"
5	Andrew Hampsten (USA)	7 Eleven–Hoonved	+ 14' 18"
6	Pedro Delgado (ESP)	PDM	s.t.
7	Luis Herrera (COL)	Café de Colombia	+ 14' 39"
8	Anselmo Fuerte (ESP)	BH	s.t.
9	Beat Breu (SUI)	Joker–Emerxil–Eddy Merckx	+ 14' 52"
10	Fabio Parra (COL)	Café de Colombia	+ 14' 55"

General classification after stage 16

Rank	Rider	Team	Time
1	Charly Mottet (FRA)	Système U	72h 00' 24"
2	Jean-François Bernard (FRA)	Toshiba–Look–La Vie Claire	+ 1' 11"
3	Stephen Roche (IRL)	Carrera	+ 1' 26"
4	Pedro Delgado (ESP)	PDM	+ 3' 16"
5	Robert Millar (GBR)	Panasonic–Isostar	+ 5' 40"
6	Raúl Alcalá (MEX)	7 Eleven–Hoonved	+ 7' 08"
7	Andrew Hampsten (USA)	7 Eleven–Hoonved	+ 7' 39"
8	Pablo Wilches (COL)	Ryalco–Manzana–Postobón	+ 7' 40"
9	Luis Herrera (COL)	Café de Colombia	+ 7' 50"
10	Urs Zimmermann (SUI)	Carrera	+ 9' 27"

== Stage 17 ==
17 July 1987 — Millau to Avignon, 239 km (149 mi)

Stage 17 result

Rank	Rider	Team	Time
1	Jean-Paul van Poppel (NED)	Superconfex–Kwantum–Yoko–Colnago	6h 17' 44"
2	Guido Bontempi (ITA)	Carrera	s.t.
3	Manuel Jorge Domínguez (ESP)	BH	s.t.
4	Jozef Lieckens (BEL)	Joker–Emerxil–Eddy Merckx	s.t.
5	Teun van Vliet (NED)	Panasonic–Isostar	s.t.
6	Malcolm Elliott (GBR)	ANC–Halfords–Lycra	s.t.
7	Ron Kiefel (USA)	7 Eleven–Hoonved	s.t.
8	Steve Bauer (CAN)	Toshiba–Look–La Vie Claire	s.t.
9	Mathieu Hermans (NED)	Caja Rural–Orbea	s.t.
10	Herman Frison (BEL)	Roland–Skala–Chiori–Colnago	s.t.

General classification after stage 17

Rank	Rider	Team	Time
1	Charly Mottet (FRA)	Système U	78h 18' 08"
2	Jean-François Bernard (FRA)	Toshiba–Look–La Vie Claire	+ 1' 11"
3	Stephen Roche (IRL)	Carrera	+ 1' 26"
4	Pedro Delgado (ESP)	PDM	+ 3' 16"
5	Robert Millar (GBR)	Panasonic–Isostar	+ 5' 40"
6	Raúl Alcalá (MEX)	7 Eleven–Hoonved	+ 7' 08"
7	Andrew Hampsten (USA)	7 Eleven–Hoonved	+ 7' 39"
8	Luis Herrera (COL)	Café de Colombia	+ 7' 50"
9	Pablo Wilches (COL)	Ryalco–Manzana–Postobón	+ 8' 54"
10	Urs Zimmermann (SUI)	Carrera	+ 9' 27"

== Stage 18 ==
19 July 1987 — Carpentras to Mont Ventoux, 36.5 km (22.7 mi) (ITT)

Stage 18 result

Rank	Rider	Team	Time
1	Jean-François Bernard (FRA)	Toshiba–Look–La Vie Claire	1h 19' 44"
2	Luis Herrera (COL)	Café de Colombia	+ 1' 39"
3	Pedro Delgado (ESP)	PDM	+ 1' 51"
4	Fabio Parra (COL)	Café de Colombia	+ 2' 04"
5	Stephen Roche (IRL)	Carrera	+ 2' 19"
6	Martial Gayant (FRA)	Système U	+ 2' 52"
7	Rafaël Antonio Acevedo (COL)	Café de Colombia	+ 3' 05"
8	Denis Roux (FRA)	Z–Peugeot	+ 3' 34"
9	Charly Mottet (FRA)	Système U	+ 3' 58"
10	Pablo Wilches (COL)	Ryalco–Manzana–Postobón	+ 4' 18"

General classification after stage 18

Rank	Rider	Team	Time
1	Jean-François Bernard (FRA)	Toshiba–Look–La Vie Claire	79h 39' 03"
2	Stephen Roche (IRL)	Carrera	+ 2' 34"
3	Charly Mottet (FRA)	Système U	+ 2' 47"
4	Pedro Delgado (ESP)	PDM	+ 3' 56"
5	Luis Herrera (COL)	Café de Colombia	+ 8' 18"
6	Robert Millar (GBR)	Panasonic–Isostar	+ 9' 43"
7	Fabio Parra (COL)	Café de Colombia	+ 11' 15"
8	Pablo Wilches (COL)	Ryalco–Manzana–Postobón	+ 12' 01"
9	Andrew Hampsten (USA)	7 Eleven–Hoonved	+ 12' 40"
10	Urs Zimmermann (SUI)	Carrera	+ 14' 26"

== Stage 19 ==
20 July 1987 — Valréas to Villard-de-Lans, 185 km (115 mi)

Stage 19 result

Rank	Rider	Team	Time
1	Pedro Delgado (ESP)	PDM	4h 53' 34"
2	Stephen Roche (IRL)	Carrera	+ 3"
3	Marino Lejarreta (ESP)	Caja Rural–Orbea	+ 31"
4	Anselmo Fuerte (ESP)	BH	s.t.
5	Charly Mottet (FRA)	Système U	s.t.
6	Luis Herrera (COL)	Café de Colombia	+ 1' 06"
7	Alfred Achermann (SUI)	Kas–Miko	+ 2' 08"
8	Theo de Rooij (NED)	Panasonic–Isostar	s.t.
9	Martial Gayant (FRA)	Système U	s.t.
10	Laurent Fignon (FRA)	Système U	s.t.

General classification after stage 19

Rank	Rider	Team	Time
1	Stephen Roche (IRL)	Carrera	84h 35' 14"
2	Charly Mottet (FRA)	Système U	+ 41"
3	Pedro Delgado (ESP)	PDM	+ 1' 19"
4	Jean-François Bernard (FRA)	Toshiba–Look–La Vie Claire	+ 1' 39"
5	Luis Herrera (COL)	Café de Colombia	+ 6' 47"
6	Fabio Parra (COL)	Café de Colombia	+ 12' 54"
7	Pablo Wilches (COL)	Ryalco–Manzana–Postobón	+ 13' 40"
8	Andrew Hampsten (USA)	7 Eleven–Hoonved	+ 14' 19"
9	Marino Lejarreta (ESP)	Caja Rural–Orbea	+ 14' 49"
10	Raúl Alcalá (MEX)	7 Eleven–Hoonved	+ 15' 09"

== Stage 20 ==
21 July 1987 — Villard-de-Lans to Alpe d'Huez, 201 km (125 mi)

Stage 20 result

Rank	Rider	Team	Time
1	Federico Echave (ESP)	BH	5h 52' 11"
2	Anselmo Fuerte (ESP)	BH	+ 1' 32"
3	Christophe Lavainne (FRA)	Système U	+ 2' 12"
4	Martín Ramírez (COL)	Café de Colombia	+ 3' 00"
5	Luis Herrera (COL)	Café de Colombia	+ 3' 19"
6	Laurent Fignon (FRA)	Système U	+ 3' 25"
7	Pedro Delgado (ESP)	PDM	+ 3' 44"
8	Guido Van Calster (BEL)	BH	s.t.
9	Claude Criquielion (BEL)	Hitachi–Marc–Rossin–Mavic	+ 4' 23"
10	Gerhard Zadrobilek (AUT)	Supermercati Brianzoli–Chateau d'Ax	+ 4' 43"

General classification after stage 20

Rank	Rider	Team	Time
1	Pedro Delgado (ESP)	PDM	90h 32' 20"
2	Stephen Roche (IRL)	Carrera	+ 25"
3	Jean-François Bernard (FRA)	Toshiba–Look–La Vie Claire	+ 2' 02"
4	Charly Mottet (FRA)	Système U	+ 2' 12"
5	Luis Herrera (COL)	Café de Colombia	+ 5' 03"
6	Fabio Parra (COL)	Café de Colombia	+ 13' 12"
7	Raúl Alcalá (MEX)	7 Eleven–Hoonved	+ 15' 16"
8	Laurent Fignon (FRA)	Système U	+ 15' 41"
9	Anselmo Fuerte (ESP)	BH	+ 15' 54"
10	Marino Lejarreta (ESP)	Caja Rural–Orbea	+ 17' 03"

== Stage 21 ==
22 July 1987 — Le Bourg-d'Oisans to La Plagne, 185.5 km (115.3 mi)

Stage 21 result

Rank	Rider	Team	Time
1	Laurent Fignon (FRA)	Système U	6h 07' 05"
2	Anselmo Fuerte (ESP)	BH	s.t.
3	Fabio Parra (COL)	Café de Colombia	+ 39"
4	Pedro Delgado (ESP)	PDM	+ 57"
5	Stephen Roche (IRL)	Carrera	+ 1' 01"
6	Denis Roux (FRA)	Z–Peugeot	+ 1' 05"
7	Luciano Loro (ITA)	Del Tongo–Colnago	+ 1' 14"
8	Luis Herrera (COL)	Café de Colombia	+ 1' 44"
9	Charly Mottet (FRA)	Système U	+ 1' 57"
10	Jean-François Bernard (FRA)	Toshiba–Look–La Vie Claire	+ 3' 03"

General classification after stage 21

Rank	Rider	Team	Time
1	Pedro Delgado (ESP)	PDM	96h 40' 30"
2	Stephen Roche (IRL)	Carrera	+ 39"
3	Charly Mottet (FRA)	Système U	+ 3' 12"
4	Jean-François Bernard (FRA)	Toshiba–Look–La Vie Claire	+ 4' 08"
5	Luis Herrera (COL)	Café de Colombia	+ 5' 50"
6	Fabio Parra (COL)	Café de Colombia	+ 12' 54"
7	Laurent Fignon (FRA)	Système U	+ 14' 44"
8	Anselmo Fuerte (ESP)	BH	+ 14' 57"
9	Raúl Alcalá (MEX)	7 Eleven–Hoonved	+ 18' 36"
10	Claude Criquielion (BEL)	Hitachi–Marc–Rossin–Mavic	+ 24' 11"

== Stage 22 ==
23 July 1987 — La Plagne to Morzine, 186 km (116 mi)

Stage 22 result

Rank	Rider	Team	Time
1	Eduardo Chozas (ESP)	Teka	6h 13' 48"
2	Stephen Roche (IRL)	Carrera	+ 43"
3	Pedro Delgado (ESP)	PDM	+ 1' 01"
4	Marino Lejarreta (ESP)	Caja Rural–Orbea	+ 1' 10"
5	Jean-François Bernard (FRA)	Toshiba–Look–La Vie Claire	+ 1' 11"
6	Fabio Parra (COL)	Café de Colombia	s.t.
7	Eddy Schepers (BEL)	Carrera	s.t.
8	Omar Hernández (COL)	Ryalco–Manzana–Postobón	+ 2' 24"
9	Laurent Fignon (FRA)	Système U	+ 2' 25"
10	Anselmo Fuerte (ESP)	BH	s.t.

General classification after stage 22

Rank	Rider	Team	Time
1	Pedro Delgado (ESP)	PDM	102h 55' 19"
2	Stephen Roche (IRL)	Carrera	+ 21"
3	Jean-François Bernard (FRA)	Toshiba–Look–La Vie Claire	+ 4' 18"
4	Charly Mottet (FRA)	Système U	+ 5' 54"
5	Luis Herrera (COL)	Café de Colombia	+ 7' 14"
6	Fabio Parra (COL)	Café de Colombia	+ 13' 04"
7	Laurent Fignon (FRA)	Système U	+ 16' 08"
8	Anselmo Fuerte (ESP)	BH	+ 16' 21"
9	Raúl Alcalá (MEX)	7 Eleven–Hoonved	+ 21' 21"
10	Marino Lejarreta (ESP)	Caja Rural–Orbea	+ 25' 50"

== Stage 23 ==
24 July 1987 — Saint-Julien-en-Genevois to Dijon, 224.5 km (139.5 mi)

Stage 23 result

Rank	Rider	Team	Time
1	Régis Clère (FRA)	Teka	6h 41' 22"
2	Jean-Claude Leclercq (FRA)	Toshiba–Look–La Vie Claire	+ 3"
3	Alfred Achermann (SUI)	Kas–Miko	s.t.
4	Gerrie Knetemann (NED)	PDM	s.t.
5	Henk Lubberding (NED)	Panasonic–Isostar	s.t.
6	Eric Van Lancker (BEL)	Panasonic–Isostar	s.t.
7	Rudy Patry (BEL)	Roland–Skala–Chiori–Colnago	s.t.
8	Frédéric Brun (FRA)	Z–Peugeot	s.t.
9	Jean-Paul van Poppel (NED)	Superconfex–Kwantum–Yoko–Colnago	+ 2' 56"
10	Jozef Lieckens (BEL)	Joker–Emerxil–Eddy Merckx	s.t.

General classification after stage 23

Rank	Rider	Team	Time
1	Pedro Delgado (ESP)	PDM	109h 39' 37"
2	Stephen Roche (IRL)	Carrera	+ 21"
3	Jean-François Bernard (FRA)	Toshiba–Look–La Vie Claire	+ 4' 18"
4	Charly Mottet (FRA)	Système U	+ 5' 54"
5	Luis Herrera (COL)	Café de Colombia	+ 7' 14"
6	Fabio Parra (COL)	Café de Colombia	+ 13' 04"
7	Laurent Fignon (FRA)	Système U	+ 16' 08"
8	Anselmo Fuerte (ESP)	BH	+ 16' 21"
9	Raúl Alcalá (MEX)	7 Eleven–Hoonved	+ 21' 21"
10	Marino Lejarreta (ESP)	Caja Rural–Orbea	+ 25' 50"

== Stage 24 ==
25 July 1987 — Dijon to Dijon, 38 km (24 mi) (ITT)

Stage 24 result

Rank	Rider	Team	Time
1	Jean-François Bernard (FRA)	Toshiba–Look–La Vie Claire	48' 17"
2	Stephen Roche (IRL)	Carrera	+ 1' 44"
3	Marino Lejarreta (ESP)	Caja Rural–Orbea	+ 2' 28"
4	Jesper Skibby (DEN)	Roland–Skala–Chiori–Colnago	+ 2' 30"
5	Raúl Alcalá (MEX)	7 Eleven–Hoonved	+ 2' 33"
6	Miguel Induráin (ESP)	Reynolds–Seur–Sada	+ 2' 35"
7	Pedro Delgado (ESP)	PDM	+ 2' 45"
8	Charly Mottet (FRA)	Système U	+ 2' 51"
9	Peter Stevenhaagen (NED)	PDM	+ 2' 55"
10	Erik Breukink (NED)	Panasonic–Isostar	+ 2' 58"

General classification after stage 24

Rank	Rider	Team	Time
1	Stephen Roche (IRL)	Carrera	110h 29' 59"
2	Pedro Delgado (ESP)	PDM	+ 40"
3	Jean-François Bernard (FRA)	Toshiba–Look–La Vie Claire	+ 2' 13"
4	Charly Mottet (FRA)	Système U	+ 6' 40"
5	Luis Herrera (COL)	Café de Colombia	+ 9' 32"
6	Fabio Parra (COL)	Café de Colombia	+ 16' 53"
7	Laurent Fignon (FRA)	Système U	+ 18' 24"
8	Anselmo Fuerte (ESP)	BH	+ 18' 33"
9	Raúl Alcalá (MEX)	7 Eleven–Hoonved	+ 21' 49"
10	Marino Lejarreta (ESP)	Caja Rural–Orbea	+ 26' 13"

== Stage 25 ==
26 July 1987 — Créteil to Paris Champs-Élysées, 192 km (119 mi)

Stage 25 result

Rank	Rider	Team	Time
1	Jeff Pierce (USA)	7 Eleven–Hoonved	4h 57' 26"
2	Steve Bauer (CAN)	Toshiba–Look–La Vie Claire	+ 1"
3	Wim Van Eynde (BEL)	Joker–Emerxil–Eddy Merckx	+ 5"
4	Peter Stevenhaagen (NED)	PDM	+ 7"
5	Adri van der Poel (NED)	PDM	+ 11"
6	Acácio da Silva (POR)	Kas–Miko	s.t.
7	Eric Van Lancker (BEL)	Panasonic–Isostar	s.t.
8	Martial Gayant (FRA)	Système U	s.t.
9	Jean-Paul van Poppel (NED)	Superconfex–Kwantum–Yoko–Colnago	+ 17"
10	Phil Anderson (AUS)	Panasonic–Isostar	s.t.

General classification after stage 25

Rank	Rider	Team	Time
1	Stephen Roche (IRL)	Carrera	115h 27' 42"
2	Pedro Delgado (ESP)	PDM	+ 40"
3	Jean-François Bernard (FRA)	Toshiba–Look–La Vie Claire	+ 2' 13"
4	Charly Mottet (FRA)	Système U	+ 6' 40"
5	Luis Herrera (COL)	Café de Colombia	+ 9' 32"
6	Fabio Parra (COL)	Café de Colombia	+ 16' 53"
7	Laurent Fignon (FRA)	Système U	+ 18' 24"
8	Anselmo Fuerte (ESP)	BH	+ 18' 33"
9	Raúl Alcalá (MEX)	7 Eleven–Hoonved	+ 21' 49"
10	Marino Lejarreta (ESP)	Caja Rural–Orbea	+ 26' 13"
