= 1987 Tour de France, Prologue to Stage 12 =

Cycling race stages

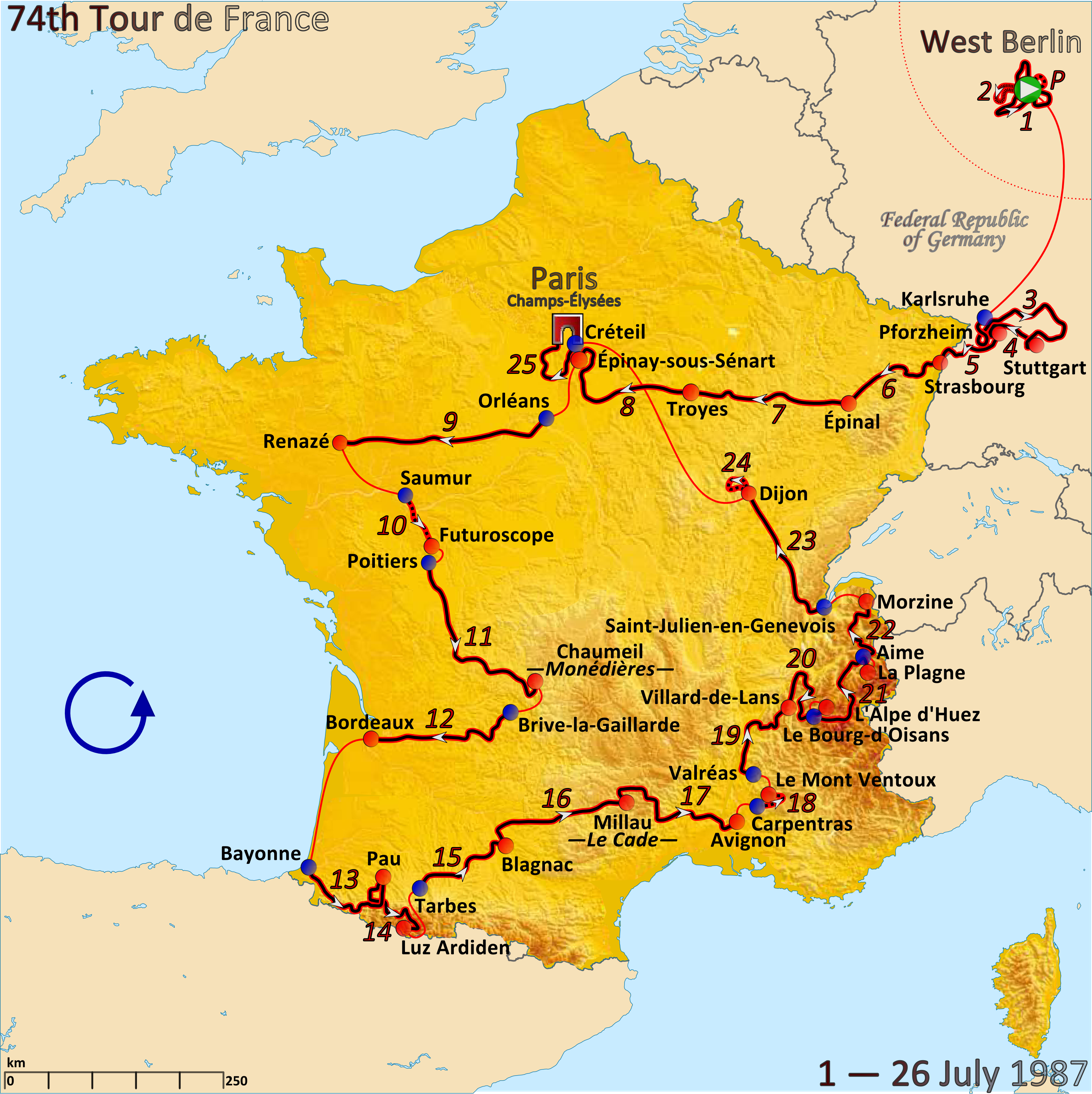
Route of the 1987 Tour de France

The 1987 Tour de France was the 74th edition of Tour de France, one of cycling's Grand Tours. The Tour began in West Berlin with a prologue individual time trial on 1 July and Stage 12 occurred on 12 July with a flat stage to Bordeaux. The race finished on the Champs-Élysées in Paris on 26 July.

== Prologue ==
1 July 1987 — West Berlin, 6.1 km (3.8 mi) (ITT)

The prologue took place along Kurfürstendamm, between the Kaiser Wilhelm Memorial Church at Breitscheidplatz and Henriettenplatz at Halensee.

Prologue result and general classification after prologue

Rank	Rider	Team	Time
1	Jelle Nijdam (NED)	Superconfex–Kwantum–Yoko–Colnago	7' 06"
2	Lech Piasecki (POL)	Del Tongo–Colnago	+ 3"
3	Stephen Roche (IRL)	Carrera	+ 7"
4	Guido Bontempi (ITA)	Carrera	s.t.
5	Milan Jurčo (CSK)	Supermercati Brianzoli–Chateau d'Ax	+ 8"
6	Dietrich Thurau (FRG)	Roland–Skala–Chiori–Colnago	s.t.
7	Jean-François Bernard (FRA)	Toshiba–Look–La Vie Claire	+ 9"
8	Miguel Induráin (ESP)	Reynolds–Seur–Sada	+ 10"
9	Thierry Marie (FRA)	Système U	s.t.
10	Czesław Lang (POL)	Del Tongo–Colnago	+ 11"

== Stage 1 ==
2 July 1987 — West Berlin, 105.5 km (65.6 mi)

Stage 1 started at the Reichstag building, and ran anti-clockwise around the city, visiting places such as Waidmannslust to the north, Wannsee to the southwest, and Britz to the southeast. The stage then returned to centre and followed a clockwise loop via Kaisereiche and Bundesallee, before finishing at Rathaus Schöneberg.

Stage 1 result

Rank	Rider	Team	Time
1	Nico Verhoeven (NED)	Superconfex–Kwantum–Yoko–Colnago	2h 11' 33"
2	Giovanni Bottoia (ITA)	Supermercati Brianzoli–Chateau d'Ax	s.t.
3	Patrick Verschueren (BEL)	Roland–Skala–Chiori–Colnago	s.t.
4	Jérôme Simon (FRA)	Z–Peugeot	s.t.
5	Theo de Rooij (NED)	Panasonic–Isostar	s.t.
6	Lech Piasecki (POL)	Del Tongo–Colnago	s.t.
7	Jörg Müller (SUI)	PDM	+ 2"
8	Rudy Patry (BEL)	Roland–Skala–Chiori–Colnago	+ 5"
9	Michel Vermote (BEL)	RMO–Meral–Mavic	+ 23"
10	Bruno Wojtinek (FRA)	Z–Peugeot	s.t.

General classification after stage 1

Rank	Rider	Team	Time
1	Lech Piasecki (POL)	Del Tongo–Colnago	2h 18' 42"
2	Patrick Verschueren (BEL)	Roland–Skala–Chiori–Colnago	+ 18"
3	Jelle Nijdam (NED)	Superconfex–Kwantum–Yoko–Colnago	+ 20"
4	Guido Bontempi (ITA)	Carrera	+ 21"
5	Jérôme Simon (FRA)	Z–Peugeot	+ 23"
6	Jean-Claude Colotti (FRA)	RMO–Meral–Mavic	+ 24"
7	Giovanni Bottoia (ITA)	Supermercati Brianzoli–Chateau d'Ax	+ 25"
8	Dietrich Thurau (FRG)	Roland–Skala–Chiori–Colnago	+ 26"
9	Stephen Roche (IRL)	Carrera	+ 27"
10	Peter Stevenhaagen (NED)	PDM	s.t.

== Stage 2 ==
2 July 1987 — West Berlin, 40.5 km (25.2 mi) (TTT)

Stage 2 started at Schloss Charlottenburg, and headed westbound towards Wilhelmstadt. The stage then ran an anti-clockwise loop at Gatow, before returning back to the city to finish at Rathaus Schöneberg.

Stage 2 result

Rank	Team	Time
1	Carrera	44' 50"
2	Del Tongo–Colnago	+ 8"
3	Panasonic–Isostar	+ 27"
4	Toshiba–Look–La Vie Claire	+ 36"
5	Système U	+ 37"
6	Z–Peugeot	+ 1' 00"
7	PDM	+ 1' 01"
8	Roland–Skala–Chiori–Colnago	+ 1' 06"
9	7 Eleven–Hoonved	+ 1' 22"
10	Superconfex–Kwantum–Yoko–Colnago	+ 1' 24"

General classification after stage 2

Rank	Rider	Team	Time
1	Lech Piasecki (POL)	Del Tongo–Colnago	3h 03' 40"
2	Guido Bontempi (ITA)	Carrera	+ 13"
3	Stephen Roche (IRL)	Carrera	+ 19"
4	Erich Maechler (SUI)	Carrera	+ 25"
5	Czesław Lang (POL)	Del Tongo–Colnago	+ 31"
6	Giancarlo Perini (ITA)	Carrera	+ 34"
7	Jørgen Pedersen (DEN)	Carrera	+ 38"
8	Giuseppe Saronni (ITA)	Del Tongo–Colnago	+ 42"
9	Silvano Contini (ITA)	Del Tongo–Colnago	+ 43"
10	Massimo Ghirotto (ITA)	Carrera	+ 46"

== Stage 3 ==
4 July 1987 — Karlsruhe to Stuttgart, 219 km (136 mi)

After transiting through the West Berlin Air Corridor, Stage 3 began in Karlsruhe and headed southbound on a figure eight loop via Malsch. After returning to Karlsruhe, the stage headed eastbound towards Heilbronn, and then southbound towards Stuttgart, via the Birkenkopf.

Stage 3 result

Rank	Rider	Team	Time
1	Acácio da Silva (POR)	Kas–Miko	5h 27' 35"
2	Erich Maechler (SUI)	Carrera	+ 2"
3	Jörg Müller (SUI)	PDM	+ 9"
4	Dag Otto Lauritzen (NOR)	7 Eleven–Hoonved	+ 14"
5	Jean-Claude Leclercq (FRA)	Toshiba–Look–La Vie Claire	+ 48"
6	Federico Echave (ESP)	BH	s.t.
7	Guy Nulens (BEL)	Panasonic–Isostar	s.t.
8	Dietrich Thurau (FRG)	Roland–Skala–Chiori–Colnago	s.t.
9	Bruno Cornillet (FRA)	Z–Peugeot	s.t.
10	Éric Caritoux (FRA)	Fagor	s.t.

General classification after stage 3

Rank	Rider	Team	Time
1	Erich Maechler (SUI)	Carrera	8h 31' 42"
2	Jörg Müller (SUI)	PDM	+ 44"
3	Giancarlo Perini (ITA)	Carrera	+ 55"
4	Acácio da Silva (POR)	Kas–Miko	+ 1' 35"
5	Charly Mottet (FRA)	Système U	+ 1' 36"
6	Guy Nulens (BEL)	Panasonic–Isostar	+ 1' 38"
7	Dietrich Thurau (FRG)	Roland–Skala–Chiori–Colnago	+ 1' 45"
8	Yvon Madiot (FRA)	Système U	+ 1' 49"
9	Dag Otto Lauritzen (NOR)	7 Eleven–Hoonved	+ 1' 50"
10	Jean-Claude Leclercq (FRA)	Toshiba–Look–La Vie Claire	+ 1' 55"

== Stage 4 ==
5 July 1987 — Stuttgart to Pforzheim, 79 km (49 mi)

Stage 4 result

Rank	Rider	Team	Time
1	Herman Frison (BEL)	Roland–Skala–Chiori–Colnago	1h 49' 23"
2	Jean-Paul van Poppel (NED)	Superconfex–Kwantum–Yoko–Colnago	+ 1' 28"
3	Stefano Allocchio (ITA)	Supermercati Brianzoli–Chateau d'Ax	s.t.
4	Phil Anderson (AUS)	Panasonic–Isostar	s.t.
5	Davis Phinney (USA)	7 Eleven–Hoonved	s.t.
6	Johan Capiot (BEL)	Roland–Skala–Chiori–Colnago	s.t.
7	Jozef Lieckens (BEL)	Joker–Emerxil–Eddy Merckx	s.t.
8	Bruno Wojtinek (FRA)	Z–Peugeot	s.t.
9	Sean Kelly (IRL)	Kas–Miko	s.t.
10	Michel Vermote (BEL)	RMO–Meral–Mavic	s.t.

General classification after stage 4

Rank	Rider	Team	Time
1	Erich Maechler (SUI)	Carrera	10h 22' 33"
2	Jörg Müller (SUI)	PDM	+ 44"
3	Giancarlo Perini (ITA)	Carrera	+ 55"
4	Acácio da Silva (POR)	Kas–Miko	+ 1' 35"
5	Charly Mottet (FRA)	Système U	+ 1' 36"
6	Guy Nulens (BEL)	Panasonic–Isostar	+ 1' 38"
7	Dietrich Thurau (FRG)	Roland–Skala–Chiori–Colnago	+ 1' 45"
8	Yvon Madiot (FRA)	Système U	+ 1' 49"
9	Dag Otto Lauritzen (NOR)	7 Eleven–Hoonved	+ 1' 50"
10	Jean-Claude Leclercq (FRA)	Toshiba–Look–La Vie Claire	+ 1' 55"

== Stage 5 ==
5 July 1987 — Pforzheim to Strasbourg, 112 km (70 mi)

Stage 5 result

Rank	Rider	Team	Time
1	Marc Sergeant (BEL)	Joker–Emerxil–Eddy Merckx	2h 32' 29"
2	Bruno Wojtinek (FRA)	Z–Peugeot	+ 13"
3	Sean Kelly (IRL)	Kas–Miko	s.t.
4	Davis Phinney (USA)	7 Eleven–Hoonved	s.t.
5	Roberto Amadio (ITA)	Supermercati Brianzoli–Chateau d'Ax	s.t.
6	Martial Gayant (FRA)	Système U	s.t.
7	Jean-Paul van Poppel (NED)	Superconfex–Kwantum–Yoko–Colnago	s.t.
8	Rudy Dhaenens (BEL)	Hitachi–Marc–Rossin–Mavic	s.t.
9	Jean-Philippe Vandenbrande (BEL)	Hitachi–Marc–Rossin–Mavic	s.t.
10	Jozef Lieckens (BEL)	Joker–Emerxil–Eddy Merckx	s.t.

General classification after stage 5

Rank	Rider	Team	Time
1	Erich Maechler (SUI)	Carrera	12h 55' 15"
2	Jörg Müller (SUI)	PDM	+ 44"
3	Giancarlo Perini (ITA)	Carrera	+ 55"
4	Acácio da Silva (POR)	Kas–Miko	+ 1' 35"
5	Charly Mottet (FRA)	Système U	+ 1' 36"
6	Guy Nulens (BEL)	Panasonic–Isostar	+ 1' 38"
7	Dietrich Thurau (FRG)	Roland–Skala–Chiori–Colnago	+ 1' 45"
8	Yvon Madiot (FRA)	Système U	+ 1' 49"
9	Dag Otto Lauritzen (NOR)	7 Eleven–Hoonved	+ 1' 50"
10	Jean-Claude Leclercq (FRA)	Toshiba–Look–La Vie Claire	+ 1' 55"

== Stage 6 ==
6 July 1987 — Strasbourg to Épinal, 169 km (105 mi)

Stage 6 result

Rank	Rider	Team	Time
1	Christophe Lavainne (FRA)	Système U	4h 12' 57"
2	Raúl Alcalá (MEX)	7 Eleven–Hoonved	+ 1' 34"
3	Manuel Jorge Domínguez (ESP)	BH	+ 2' 34"
4	Gilbert Duclos-Lassalle (FRA)	Z–Peugeot	s.t.
5	Jean-Claude Bagot (FRA)	Fagor	s.t.
6	Niki Rüttimann (SUI)	Toshiba–Look–La Vie Claire	s.t.
7	Hendrik Devos (BEL)	Hitachi–Marc–Rossin–Mavic	s.t.
8	Bernard Vallet (FRA)	RMO–Meral–Mavic	s.t.
9	Gerardo Moncada (COL)	Ryalco–Manzana–Postobón	s.t.
10	Jean-Paul van Poppel (NED)	Superconfex–Kwantum–Yoko–Colnago	+ 2' 37"

General classification after stage 6

Rank	Rider	Team	Time
1	Erich Maechler (SUI)	Carrera	17h 10' 49"
2	Christophe Lavainne (FRA)	Système U	+ 36"
3	Jörg Müller (SUI)	PDM	+ 44"
4	Giancarlo Perini (ITA)	Carrera	+ 55"
5	Acácio da Silva (POR)	Kas–Miko	+ 1' 35"
6	Charly Mottet (FRA)	Système U	+ 1' 36"
7	Guy Nulens (BEL)	Panasonic–Isostar	+ 1' 38"
8	Dietrich Thurau (FRG)	Roland–Skala–Chiori–Colnago	+ 1' 45"
9	Yvon Madiot (FRA)	Système U	+ 1' 49"
10	Dag Otto Lauritzen (NOR)	7 Eleven–Hoonved	+ 1' 50"

== Stage 7 ==
7 July 1987 — Épinal to Troyes, 211 km (131 mi)

Stage 7 result

Rank	Rider	Team	Time
1	Manuel Jorge Domínguez (ESP)	BH	5h 08' 17"
2	Jean-Paul van Poppel (NED)	Superconfex–Kwantum–Yoko–Colnago	s.t.
3	Jozef Lieckens (BEL)	Joker–Emerxil–Eddy Merckx	s.t.
4	Sean Kelly (IRL)	Kas–Miko	s.t.
5	Johan Capiot (BEL)	Roland–Skala–Chiori–Colnago	s.t.
6	Mathieu Hermans (NED)	Caja Rural–Orbea	s.t.
7	Phil Anderson (AUS)	Panasonic–Isostar	s.t.
8	Roberto Amadio (ITA)	Supermercati Brianzoli–Chateau d'Ax	s.t.
9	Malcolm Elliott (GBR)	ANC–Halfords–Lycra	s.t.
10	Jean-Philippe Vandenbrande (BEL)	Hitachi–Marc–Rossin–Mavic	s.t.

General classification after stage 7

Rank	Rider	Team	Time
1	Erich Maechler (SUI)	Carrera	22h 19' 06"
2	Christophe Lavainne (FRA)	Système U	+ 36"
3	Jörg Müller (SUI)	PDM	+ 44"
4	Giancarlo Perini (ITA)	Carrera	+ 1' 16"
5	Acácio da Silva (POR)	Kas–Miko	+ 1' 35"
6	Charly Mottet (FRA)	Système U	+ 1' 36"
7	Guy Nulens (BEL)	Panasonic–Isostar	+ 1' 38"
8	Dietrich Thurau (FRG)	Roland–Skala–Chiori–Colnago	+ 1' 45"
9	Yvon Madiot (FRA)	Système U	+ 1' 49"
10	Dag Otto Lauritzen (NOR)	7 Eleven–Hoonved	+ 1' 50"

== Stage 8 ==
8 July 1987 — Troyes to Épinay-sous-Sénart, 205.5 km (127.7 mi)

Stage 8 result

Rank	Rider	Team	Time
1	Jean-Paul van Poppel (NED)	Superconfex–Kwantum–Yoko–Colnago	5h 23' 53"
2	Michel Vermote (BEL)	RMO–Meral–Mavic	s.t.
3	Johan Capiot (BEL)	Roland–Skala–Chiori–Colnago	s.t.
4	Bruno Wojtinek (FRA)	Z–Peugeot	s.t.
5	Jozef Lieckens (BEL)	Joker–Emerxil–Eddy Merckx	s.t.
6	Stefano Allocchio (ITA)	Supermercati Brianzoli–Chateau d'Ax	s.t.
7	Davis Phinney (USA)	7 Eleven–Hoonved	s.t.
8	Manuel Jorge Domínguez (ESP)	BH	s.t.
9	Teun van Vliet (NED)	Panasonic–Isostar	s.t.
10	Frank Hoste (BEL)	Fagor	s.t.

General classification after stage 8

Rank	Rider	Team	Time
1	Erich Maechler (SUI)	Carrera	27h 42' 59"
2	Christophe Lavainne (FRA)	Système U	+ 36"
3	Jörg Müller (SUI)	PDM	+ 44"
4	Giancarlo Perini (ITA)	Carrera	+ 1' 16"
5	Acácio da Silva (POR)	Kas–Miko	+ 1' 35"
6	Charly Mottet (FRA)	Système U	+ 1' 36"
7	Guy Nulens (BEL)	Panasonic–Isostar	+ 1' 38"
8	Dietrich Thurau (FRG)	Roland–Skala–Chiori–Colnago	+ 1' 45"
9	Yvon Madiot (FRA)	Système U	+ 1' 49"
10	Dag Otto Lauritzen (NOR)	7 Eleven–Hoonved	+ 1' 50"

== Stage 9 ==
9 July 1987 — Orléans to Renazé, 260 km (160 mi)

Stage 9 result

Rank	Rider	Team	Time
1	Adri van der Poel (NED)	PDM	7h 05' 54"
2	Roberto Amadio (ITA)	Supermercati Brianzoli–Chateau d'Ax	s.t.
3	Ludo Peeters (BEL)	Superconfex–Kwantum–Yoko–Colnago	s.t.
4	Theo de Rooij (NED)	Panasonic–Isostar	s.t.
5	Dominique Garde (FRA)	Toshiba–Look–La Vie Claire	s.t.
6	Guido Bontempi (ITA)	Carrera	+ 1' 21"
7	Guido Van Calster (BEL)	BH	s.t.
8	Pascal Poisson (FRA)	Système U	s.t.
9	Guy Nulens (BEL)	Panasonic–Isostar	s.t.
10	Steven Rooks (NED)	PDM	s.t.

General classification after stage 9

Rank	Rider	Team	Time
1	Erich Maechler (SUI)	Carrera	34h 50' 25"
2	Christophe Lavainne (FRA)	Système U	+ 36"
3	Jörg Müller (SUI)	PDM	+ 44"
4	Ludo Peeters (BEL)	Superconfex–Kwantum–Yoko–Colnago	+ 58"
5	Giancarlo Perini (ITA)	Carrera	+ 1' 16"
6	Guy Nulens (BEL)	Panasonic–Isostar	+ 1' 27"
7	Acácio da Silva (POR)	Kas–Miko	+ 1' 35"
8	Charly Mottet (FRA)	Système U	+ 1' 36"
9	Dietrich Thurau (FRG)	Roland–Skala–Chiori–Colnago	+ 1' 45"
10	Yvon Madiot (FRA)	Système U	+ 1' 49"

== Stage 10 ==
10 July 1987 — Saumur to Futuroscope, 87.5 km (54.4 mi) (ITT)

Stage 10 result

Rank	Rider	Team	Time
1	Stephen Roche (IRL)	Carrera	1h 58' 11"
2	Charly Mottet (FRA)	Système U	+ 42"
3	Jesper Skibby (DEN)	Roland–Skala–Chiori–Colnago	+ 53"
4	Marc Madiot (FRA)	Système U	+ 1' 09"
5	Dietrich Thurau (FRG)	Roland–Skala–Chiori–Colnago	+ 1' 20"
6	Jean-François Bernard (FRA)	Toshiba–Look–La Vie Claire	+ 1' 24"
7	Peter Stevenhaagen (NED)	PDM	+ 1' 55"
8	Dag Otto Lauritzen (NOR)	7 Eleven–Hoonved	+ 2' 11"
9	Jörg Müller (SUI)	PDM	+ 2' 24"
10	Pedro Delgado (ESP)	PDM	+ 2' 29"

General classification after stage 10

Rank	Rider	Team	Time
1	Charly Mottet (FRA)	Système U	36h 50' 54"
2	Dietrich Thurau (FRG)	Roland–Skala–Chiori–Colnago	+ 47"
3	Jörg Müller (SUI)	PDM	+ 50"
4	Erich Maechler (SUI)	Carrera	+ 1' 06"
5	Dag Otto Lauritzen (NOR)	7 Eleven–Hoonved	+ 1' 43"
6	Stephen Roche (IRL)	Carrera	+ 3' 23"
7	Bruno Cornillet (FRA)	Z–Peugeot	+ 4' 31"
8	Jean-François Bernard (FRA)	Toshiba–Look–La Vie Claire	+ 5' 31"
9	Acácio da Silva (POR)	Kas–Miko	+ 5' 38"
10	Jesper Skibby (DEN)	Roland–Skala–Chiori–Colnago	+ 5' 45"

== Stage 11 ==
11 July 1987 — Poitiers to Chaumeil, 255 km (158 mi)

Stage 11 result

Rank	Rider	Team	Time
1	Martial Gayant (FRA)	Système U	7h 06' 55"
2	Laudelino Cubino (ESP)	BH	+ 38"
3	Kim Andersen (DEN)	Toshiba–Look–La Vie Claire	+ 1' 38"
4	Gilles Mas (FRA)	RMO–Meral–Mavic	+ 1' 44"
5	Massimo Ghirotto (ITA)	Carrera	+ 3' 27"
6	Peter Hilse (FRG)	Teka	s.t.
7	Marc Sergeant (BEL)	Joker–Emerxil–Eddy Merckx	+ 3' 30"
8	Heinz Imboden (SUI)	Toshiba–Look–La Vie Claire	+ 3' 34"
9	Jan Nevens (BEL)	Joker–Emerxil–Eddy Merckx	+ 3' 52"
10	Stefano Allocchio (ITA)	Supermercati Brianzoli–Chateau d'Ax	+ 4' 30"

General classification after stage 11

Rank	Rider	Team	Time
1	Martial Gayant (FRA)	Système U	44h 08' 29"
2	Charly Mottet (FRA)	Système U	+ 22"
3	Dietrich Thurau (FRG)	Roland–Skala–Chiori–Colnago	+ 1' 09"
4	Jörg Müller (SUI)	PDM	+ 1' 12"
5	Dag Otto Lauritzen (NOR)	7 Eleven–Hoonved	+ 2' 05"
6	Stephen Roche (IRL)	Carrera	+ 3' 45"
7	Marc Sergeant (BEL)	Joker–Emerxil–Eddy Merckx	+ 4' 11"
8	Bruno Cornillet (FRA)	Z–Peugeot	+ 4' 53"
9	Erich Maechler (SUI)	Carrera	+ 5' 05"
10	Kim Andersen (DEN)	Toshiba–Look–La Vie Claire	+ 5' 52"

== Stage 12 ==
12 July 1987 — Brive to Bordeaux, 228 km (142 mi)

Stage 12 result

Rank	Rider	Team	Time
1	Davis Phinney (USA)	7 Eleven–Hoonved	5h 46' 21"
2	Jean-Paul van Poppel (NED)	Superconfex–Kwantum–Yoko–Colnago	s.t.
3	Malcolm Elliott (GBR)	ANC–Halfords–Lycra	s.t.
4	Jean-Philippe Vandenbrande (BEL)	Hitachi–Marc–Rossin–Mavic	s.t.
5	Teun van Vliet (NED)	Panasonic–Isostar	s.t.
6	Marc Sergeant (BEL)	Joker–Emerxil–Eddy Merckx	s.t.
7	Christophe Lavainne (FRA)	Système U	s.t.
8	Frank Hoste (BEL)	Fagor	s.t.
9	Herman Frison (BEL)	Roland–Skala–Chiori–Colnago	s.t.
10	Jozef Lieckens (BEL)	Joker–Emerxil–Eddy Merckx	s.t.

General classification after stage 12

Rank	Rider	Team	Time
1	Martial Gayant (FRA)	Système U	49h 54' 50"
2	Charly Mottet (FRA)	Système U	+ 22"
3	Dietrich Thurau (FRG)	Roland–Skala–Chiori–Colnago	+ 1' 09"
4	Jörg Müller (SUI)	Panasonic–Isostar	+ 1' 12"
5	Dag Otto Lauritzen (NOR)	7 Eleven–Hoonved	+ 2' 05"
6	Stephen Roche (IRL)	Carrera	+ 3' 45"
7	Marc Sergeant (BEL)	Joker–Emerxil–Eddy Merckx	+ 4' 11"
8	Bruno Cornillet (FRA)	Z–Peugeot	+ 4' 53"
9	Erich Maechler (SUI)	Carrera	+ 5' 05"
10	Kim Andersen (DEN)	Toshiba–Look–La Vie Claire	+ 5' 52"
