= 1987 UCI Road World Championships – Men's road race =

Men's Individual Road Race
1987 UCI Road World Championships

Race details
- Dates: September 6, 1987
- Stages: 1
- Distance: 269.1 km (167.2 mi)
- Winning time: 6h 50' 02"

Medalists
	Gold	Stephen Roche (IRL)	(Ireland)
	Silver	Moreno Argentin (ITA)	(Italy)
	Bronze	Juan Fernández (ESP)	(Spain)

The Men's Individual Road Race of the 1987 UCI Road World Championships cycling event took place on September 6 in Villach, Austria. The route consisted of twenty-three laps totaling to a length of 276 km (171 mi). Irishman Stephen Roche won the race, while Italian Moreno Argentin and Spaniard Juan Fernández finished second and third, respectively. By winning the race, Roche also completed the Triple Crown of Cycling, which consists of winning two Grand Tour races and the men's road race at the UCI Road World Championships in a calendar year.

== Race route and details ==
The race route contained 23 laps of 11.7 km (7.3 mi), equaling a total 269.1 km (167.2 mi) of racing in all. Each lap featured two climbs that were 100 m (330 ft) and 90 m (300 ft), respectively, with some portions having a ten percent gradient. The race started at 10:30 AM local time. Sportswriters found the course to be suited for sprinters, believing that the race would likely result in a sprint finish. Swiss rider Bernard Gavillet stated that it favored the sprinters and the pure climbers chances "are almost zero." The race featured a 500,000 Swiss francs prize for the first place rider, to split among his fellow countrymen. The Italian Cycling Federation had an additional bonus that they'd award each team member 120,000 Swiss francs if an Italian won the race.

== Participants and race favorites ==
The race began with 168 riders from 26 different countries, of which 71 finished. L'Impartial writer Michel Deruns felt the race was open to 40 or so riders to win the event as he felt it would likely end in a bunch sprint. The starting field featured the previous year's winner Moreno Argentin, who was seen as the race favorite by many journalists and the Austrian bookmakers. Guido Bontempi (Italy), Sean Kelly (Ireland), Teun van Vliet (Dutch), and Eric Vanderaerden (Belgium) as other riders capable of winning the race. Swiss rider Erich Maechler who won Milan–San Remo that season was viewed as Switzerland's best hope to win the race. A writer for Amigoe believed the Dutch and Italian teams to be the best teams competing in the race. La Stampa writer Gian Paolo Ormezzano believed an Italian rider would win the race, specifically Argentin or Bontempi, but stated the Dutch riders were a team to "fear." Cees Olsthoorn of Het vrĳe volk believed that Steven Rooks and van Vliet were the Dutch riders with the best chances of winning. El Mundo Deportivo's Javier Delmases wrote that after seeing the slightly uphill finish to the route that Spain's best chance came with uphill sprint specialist Juan Fernández would have a good chance to earn another medal at the World Championships. He had won bronze in the world championships road race. El Mundo Deportivo reported specifically that Argentin was a 5:1 favorite, while Roche was 12:1.

Giro d'Italia and Tour de France winner Stephen Roche was viewed as a contender due to his great form throughout the season. There was significant media coverage around Roche because if he won the race, he would win cycling's Triple Crown, where one wins the Giro d'Italia, Tour de France, and the men's road race at the UCI Road World Championships in one calendar year. Only five cyclists had won the two Grand Tours in a single season by that point. A writer for The Guardian stated that if the climbs were higher, Roche's chances would be better. There were concerns over Roche's fitness at the time because he took a break from racing following his Tour success and in his first race back Tre Valli Varesine, he did not perform well.

== Race summary ==
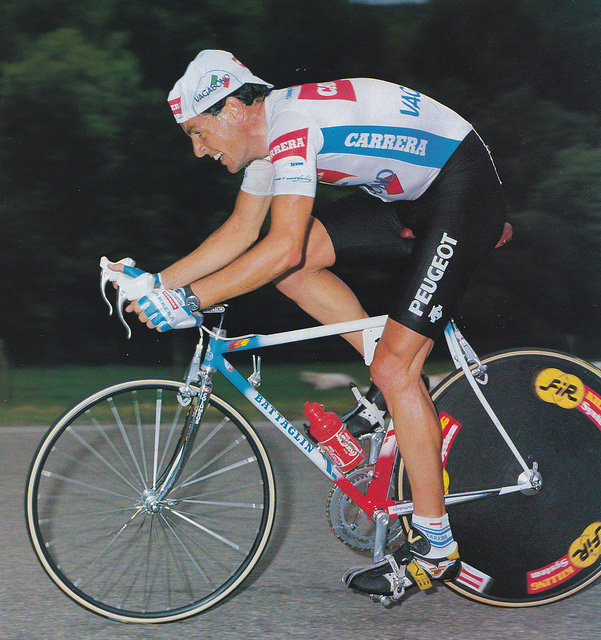
Stephen Roche, pictured earlier in the season at the Giro d'Italia, won the race and became the second rider to achieve the Triple Crown of Cycling.

After speculation of the start being delayed due to severe thunderstorms, the race began on time, during heavy rain. The rain on course caused the earlier portion of the race to be slower, what De Telegraaf described as "dull." The rain lasted for approximately the first three hours of racing. Portugal's Orlando Neves attacked off the front of the peloton early and established a lead of nearly two minutes, but was caught by the main field 75 km (47 mi) later.

On the eighteenth lap, Jan Nevens (Belgium), Argentin (Italy), van Vliet (Dutch), and Juan Fernández (Spain) formed a breakaway. The quartet stretched a lead of one minute over chasing riders. As the riders chased the leaders, Roche (Ireland) and Steve Bauer (Canada) led a group of fifteen to join the leading four during the twenty-first lap. Roche had been principally working to help teammate Sean Kelly get to a final sprint. Shortly after joining the lead bunch, Erik Breukink made a move off the front, only to be caught by Belgian Jozef Lieckens. Van Vliet made another move between three kilometers and one and a half kilometers to go, which Roche, Rolf Sørensen (Denmark), Guido Winterberg and Rolf Gölz (Germany) followed. These attacks by the Dutch riders split the group of thirteen on the road, which left Kelly in the group behind. Sørensen feigned a move with close to 400 m (1,300 ft) remaining, which promoted Roche to react and overtake him as the finish approached. As Roche made his move, Fernández pursued and Argentin followed in his slipstream. Roche beat Argentin, who had overtaken Fernández, to the line by four bike lengths, as the trailing group bridged the gap.

== Result ==
Final placings (1–71)
Rank	Rider	Country	Time
1	Stephen Roche	Ireland	6h 50' 02"
1	Moreno Argentin	Italy	+ 1"
1	Juan Fernández	Spain	s.t.
4	Rolf Gölz	Germany	s.t.
5	Sean Kelly	Ireland	s.t.
6	Steven Rooks	Netherlands	s.t.
7	Teun van Vliet	Netherlands	s.t.
8	Rolf Sørensen	Denmark	s.t.
9	Erik Breukink	Netherlands	s.t.
10	Claude Criquielion	Belgium	s.t.
11	Guido Winterberg	Switzerland	s.t.
12	Jörg Müller	Switzerland	s.t.
13	Steve Bauer	Canada	s.t.
14	Eric Vanderaerden	Belgium	+ 40"
15	Martial Gayant	France	s.t.
16	Paul Popp	Austria	s.t.
17	Andreas Kappes	Germany	s.t.
18	Adri Van der Poel	Netherlands	s.t.
19	Marc Sergeant	Belgium	s.t.
20	Jeff Pierce	United States	s.t.
21	Phil Anderson	Australia	s.t.
22	Peter Stevenhaagen	Netherlands	s.t.
23	Ferdi Van Den Haute	Belgium	s.t.
24	Czesław Lang	Poland	s.t.
25	Ron Kiefel	United States	s.t.
26	Guido Bontempi	Italy	s.t.
27	Alfonso Gutiérrez	Spain	s.t.
28	Lars Wahlqvist	Sweden	s.t.
29	Gerhard Zadrobilek	Austria	s.t.
30	Kim Andersen	Denmark	s.t.
31	Gilbert Glaus	Switzerland	s.t.
32	Fabian Fuchs	Switzerland	s.t.
33	Jan Nevens	Belgium	s.t.
34	Lech Piasecki	Poland	s.t.
35	Thomas Wegmüller	Switzerland	s.t.
36	Celestino Prieto	Spain	s.t.
37	Federico Echave	Spain	s.t.
38	Marino Lejarreta	Spain	s.t.
39	Jørgen Marcussen	Denmark	s.t.
40	Álvaro Pino	Spain	s.t.
41	Maurizio Fondriest	Italy	s.t.
42	Gilbert Duclos-Lassalle	France	s.t.
43	Masatoshi Ichikawa	Japan	s.t.
44	Paul Kimmage	Ireland	s.t.
45	Andrew Hampsten	United States	s.t.
46	Peter Hilse	Germany	s.t.
47	Erich Mächler	Switzerland	s.t.
48	Giuseppe Saronni	Italy	s.t.
49	Jean-François Bernard	France	s.t.
50	Kurt Steinmann	Switzerland	s.t.
51	Joop Zoetemelk	Netherlands	s.t.
52	Robert Millar	United Kingdom	s.t.
53	Bruno Leali	Italy	s.t.
54	Emanuele Bombini	Italy	s.t.
55	Luciano Loro	Italy	s.t.
56	Massimo Ghirotto	Italy	s.t.
57	Gerrie Knetemann	Netherlands	s.t.
58	Acácio da Silva	Portugal	s.t.
59	Marc Madiot	France	s.t.
60	Guy Nulens	Belgium	s.t.
61	Johan Van der Velde	Netherlands	s.t.
62	Gianni Bugno	Italy	s.t.
63	Othmar Häfliger	Switzerland	s.t.
64	Miguel Induráin	Spain	s.t.
65	Roberto Pagnin	Italy	s.t.
66	Francesco Moser	Italy	s.t.
67	Jonathan Boyer	United States	+ 1' 45"
68	Etienne De Wilde	Belgium	s.t.
69	Frédéric Brun	France	s.t.
70	Sean Yates	United Kingdom	s.t.
71	Jozef Lieckens	Belgium	s.t.

== Aftermath ==
Roche became the first ever Irishman to win the men's road race at the UCI Road World Championships. In addition, he became the second rider – after Eddy Merckx in 1974 – to complete the Triple Crown of Cycling, which consists of winning two Grand Tour races and the men's road race at the UCI Road World Championships in a calendar year. Upon finishing the race, Roche stated that was like "a fairy tale" and that he "came to Austria to help [Sean] Kelly" going on to mention how the course did not suit him and he was not well prepared for the race. Roche commented on his day's performance saying: "Normally, I never do that kind of move – sprinting from the front for so long – but I realized that If I didn't do something, I'd finish fourth or fifth." For his achievements during the 1987 cycling season, Roche was named Freedom of the City of Dublin and became the first athlete to be given this honor. Michel Deruns of L'Impartial felt that the race was one of the best in the past twenty years in the event, with Roche being the only rider deserving of winning. He stated that Roche did a great job at trying to support Kelly and the two quelled any attacks from the field as the race wound down.

Dutchman Teun van Vliet stated that Germany's Rolf Gölz was on his wheel as Roche launched the final attack. Van Vliet stated "I was still fresh", but he elected not to chase hard after Roche as Gölz would benefit from his slipstream and have a great chance to win the race, to which van Vliet commented "I didn't like that thought." Fellow countryman, Adri Van der Poel felt the Dutch team had a strong showing and commented: "If we can continue to build with this group, there will be more in the future. Then success cannot be inevitable." De Telegraaf felt the Dutch team performed very well, citing three riders finished in the top nine placings. Jean-Paul van Poppel was regarded as the worst Dutch performer as his legs' "blocked" during the first lap and did not finish the race. Durens felt the Swiss riders collectively raced an aggressive race, with two riders, Guido Winterberg and Jörg Müller, finishing in the lead bunch. He felt that if the two riders worked together in the final sprint, Winterberg could have finished in the top five or placed on the podium.
