= 1987 Tour de France =

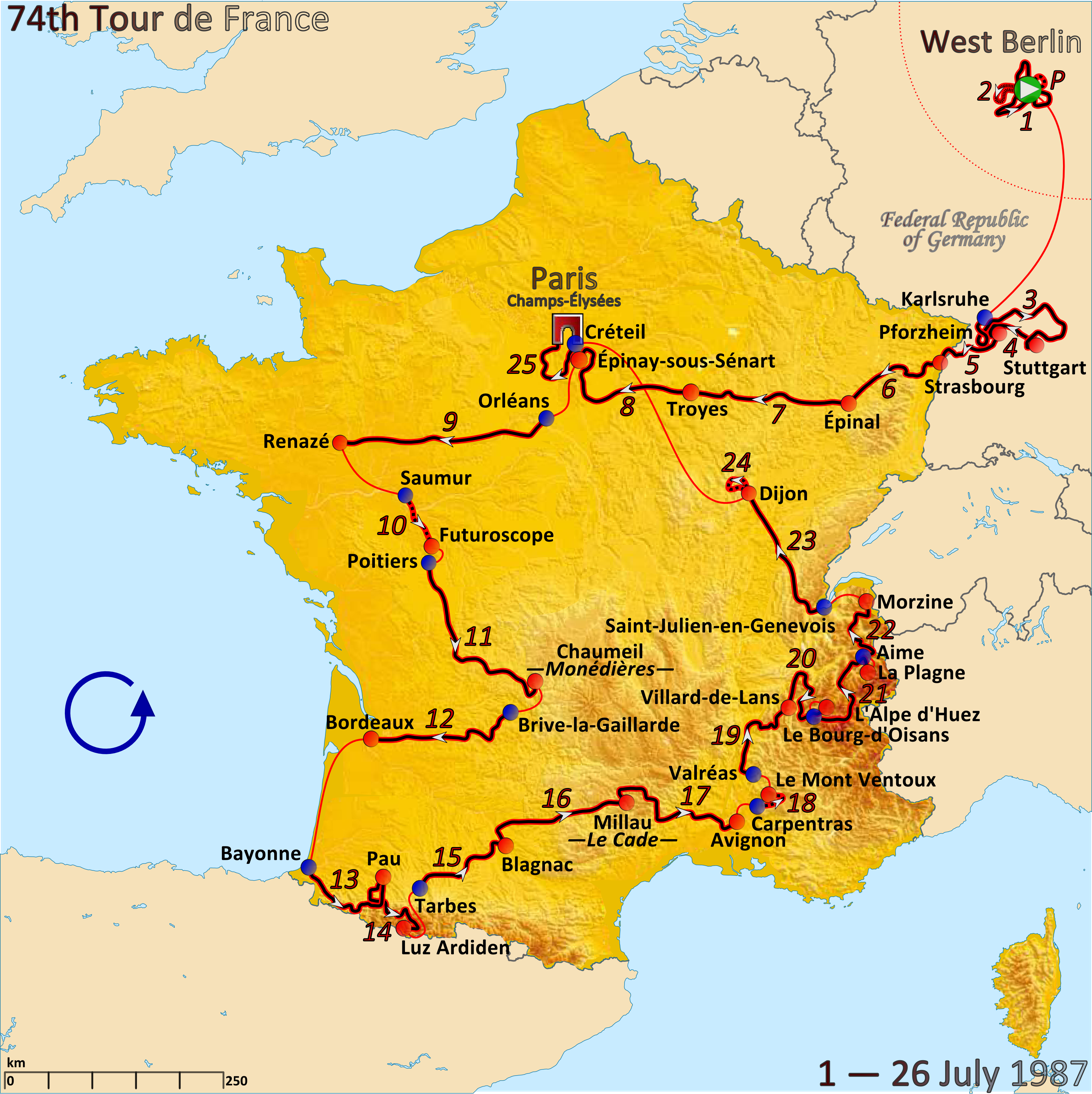
- Route of the 1987 Tour de France

Race details
- Dates: 1–26 July 1987
- Stages: 25 + Prologue
- Distance: 4,231 km (2,629 mi)
- Winning time: 115h 27' 42"

Results
Jersey awarded to the overall winner	Winner	Stephen Roche (IRE)	(Carrera Jeans–Vagabond)
	Second	Pedro Delgado (ESP)	(PDM–Ultima–Concorde)
	Third	Jean-François Bernard (FRA)	(Toshiba–Look)
Jersey awarded to the points classification winner	Points	Jean-Paul van Poppel (NED)	(Superconfex–Kwantum–Yoko–Colnago)
Jersey awarded to the mountains classification winner	Mountains	Luis Herrera (COL)	(Café de Colombia–Varta)
Jersey awarded to the young rider classification winner	Young rider	Raúl Alcalá (MEX)	(7-Eleven)
Jersey awarded to the combination classification winner	Combination	Jean-François Bernard (FRA)	(Toshiba–Look)
Jersey awarded to the sprints classification winner	Sprints	Gilbert Duclos-Lassalle (FRA)	(Vétements Z–Peugeot)
	Combativity	Régis Clère (FRA)	(Teka)
	Team	Système U	
	Team points	Système U	

The 1987 Tour de France was the 74th edition of the Tour de France, taking place from 1 to 26 July. It had 25 stages over 4,231 km (2,629 mi). It was the closest three-way finish in the Tour until the 2007 Tour de France, among the closest overall races in Tour history and the 1st, 2nd, 3rd and 4th place riders each wore the Yellow jersey at some point during the race. It was won by Stephen Roche, the first and so far only Irishman to do so.

The winner of the 1986 Tour de France, Greg LeMond was unable to defend his title following a shooting accident in April.

Following Stage 1, Poland's Lech Piasecki became the first rider from the Eastern Bloc to lead the Tour de France. He was one of eight different men to wear yellow, a new record for the Tour.

== Teams ==
The number of cyclists in one team was reduced from 10 to 9, to allow more teams in the race. The 1987 Tour started with 207 cyclists, divided into 23 teams. Of these, 62 were riding the Tour de France for the first time. The average age of riders in the race was 27.05 years, ranging from the 20-year-old Jean-Claude Colotti (RMO–Cycles Méral–Mavic) to the 36-year-old Gerrie Knetemann (PDM–Ultima–Concorde). The Caja Rural–Orbea cyclists had the youngest average age while the riders on Del Tongo had the oldest.

The teams entering the race were:

- 7-Eleven
- ANC–Halfords
- BH
- Café de Colombia–Varta
- Caja Rural–Orbea
- Carrera Jeans–Vagabond
- Del Tongo
- Fagor–MBK
- Hitachi–Marc
- Joker–Merckx
- Kas
- Panasonic–Isostar
- PDM–Ultima–Concorde
- Postobón–Manzana–Ryalcao
- Reynolds
- Roland–Skala
- RMO–Cycles Méral–Mavic
- Superconfex–Kwantum–Yoko–Colnago
- Supermercati Brianzoli–Chateau d'Ax
- Système U
- Teka
- Toshiba–Look
- Vétements Z–Peugeot

== Pre-race favourites ==
Shortly before the Tour, on 20 April 1987, the defending champion Greg LeMond was accidentally shot by his brother-in-law while hunting turkeys. He was unable to start the 1987 Tour, and because Bernard Hinault (second placed in 1986, and the only rider to seriously challenge LeMond in 1986) had retired, the Tour started without a clear favourite.

Only one previous winner started in the 1987 Tour: Laurent Fignon, winner in 1983 and 1984. Since then, Fignon had struggled with his form, but in the first months of 1987, Fignon had finally shown some good results. LeMond's place as leader of the Toshiba team was now taken by Jean-François Bernard. He had finished in twelfth place in the previous year as helper of LeMond and Hinault, so more was expected from him now. The Carrera team was led by Stephen Roche. For Roche, the months before the 1987 Tour had gone well, having won the 1987 Giro d'Italia. In the recent Tours, Pedro Delgado had shown improving results, and he had some talented helpers in his PDM team, so he was also considered a contender.

== Route and stages ==
In 1985, it was announced that the 1987 Tour would start in West-Berlin, to celebrate the 750th anniversary of the city's founding. The 1987 Tour de France started on 1 July, and had one rest day, in Avignon. There were 25 stages (and a prologue), more than ever before. The highest point of elevation in the race was 2,642 m (8,668 ft) at the summit of the Col du Galibier mountain pass on stage 21.

Stage characteristics and winners
Stage	Date	Course	Distance	Type	Winner
P	1 July	West Berlin (West Germany)	6 km (3.7 mi)	Individual time trial	Jelle Nijdam (NED)
1	2 July	West Berlin (West Germany)	105 km (65 mi)	Plain stage	Nico Verhoeven (NED)
2	2 July	West Berlin (West Germany)	41 km (25 mi)	Team time trial	(Italy) Carrera Jeans–Vagabond
3	4 July	Karlsruhe (West Germany) to Stuttgart (West Germany)	219 km (136 mi)	Plain stage	Acácio da Silva (POR)
4	5 July	Stuttgart (West Germany) to Pforzheim (West Germany)	79 km (49 mi)	Plain stage	Herman Frison (BEL)
5	5 July	Pforzheim (West Germany) to Strasbourg	112 km (70 mi)	Plain stage	Marc Sergeant (BEL)
6	6 July	Strasbourg to Épinal	169 km (105 mi)	Plain stage	Christophe Lavainne (FRA)
7	7 July	Épinal to Troyes	211 km (131 mi)	Plain stage	Manuel Jorge Domínguez (ESP)
8	8 July	Troyes to Épinay-sous-Sénart	206 km (128 mi)	Plain stage	Jean-Paul van Poppel (NED)
9	9 July	Orléans to Renazé	260 km (160 mi)	Plain stage	Adri van der Poel (NED)
10	10 July	Saumur to Futuroscope	87 km (54 mi)	Individual time trial	Stephen Roche (IRE)
11	11 July	Poitiers to Chaumeil	206 km (128 mi)	Hilly stage	Martial Gayant (FRA)
12	12 July	Brive to Bordeaux	228 km (142 mi)	Plain stage	Davis Phinney (USA)
13	13 July	Bayonne to Pau	219 km (136 mi)	Stage with mountain(s)	Erik Breukink (NED)
14	14 July	Pau to Luz Ardiden	166 km (103 mi)	Stage with mountain(s)	Dag Otto Lauritzen (NOR)
15	15 July	Tarbes to Blagnac	164 km (102 mi)	Plain stage	Rolf Gölz (FRG)
16	16 July	Blagnac to Millau	216 km (134 mi)	Hilly stage	Régis Clère (FRA)
17	17 July	Millau to Avignon	239 km (149 mi)	Hilly stage	Jean-Paul van Poppel (NED)
	18 July	Avignon		Rest day	
18	19 July	Carpentras to Mont Ventoux	37 km (23 mi)	Mountain time trial	Jean-François Bernard (FRA)
19	20 July	Valréas to Villard-de-Lans	185 km (115 mi)	Stage with mountain(s)	Pedro Delgado (ESP)
20	21 July	Villard-de-Lans to Alpe d'Huez	201 km (125 mi)	Stage with mountain(s)	Federico Echave (ESP)
21	22 July	Le Bourg-d'Oisans to La Plagne	185 km (115 mi)	Stage with mountain(s)	Laurent Fignon (FRA)
22	23 July	La Plagne to Morzine	186 km (116 mi)	Stage with mountain(s)	Eduardo Chozas (ESP)
23	24 July	Saint-Julien-en-Genevois to Dijon	225 km (140 mi)	Plain stage	Régis Clère (FRA)
24	25 July	Dijon	38 km (24 mi)	Individual time trial	Jean-François Bernard (FRA)
25	26 July	Créteil to Paris (Champs-Élysées)	192 km (119 mi)	Plain stage	Jeff Pierce (USA)
	Total		4,231 km (2,629 mi)		

== Race overview ==
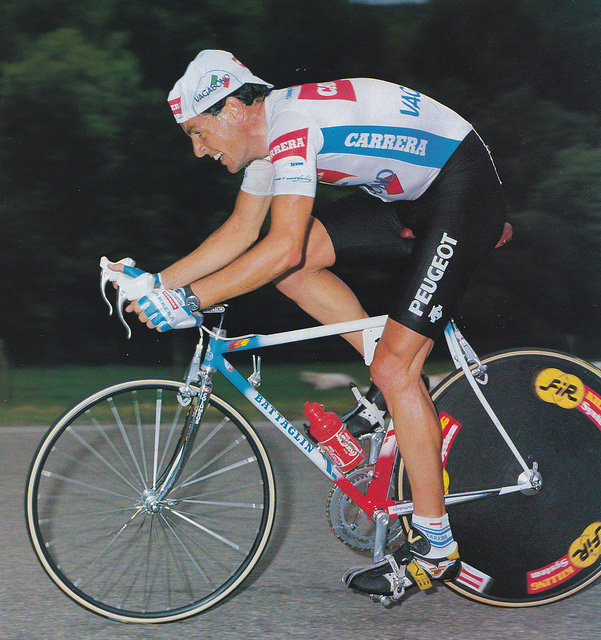
Stephen Roche (pictured in the Dijon time trial), winner of the general classification

The prologue was won by specialist Jelle Nijdam, and none of the favourites lost much time. The second place in the prologue was for Polish cyclist Lech Piasecki, and when he was part of a break-away in the first stage that won a few seconds, he became the new leader in the general classification, the first time that an Eastern-European cyclist lead the Tour de France. Piasecki kept his lead in the team time trial of stage 2, but lost it in the third stage when a break-away gained several minutes. Erich Maechler became the new leader. Maechler kept the lead for several stages. After stage nine, Maechler was still leading. The mass-start stages were dominated by break-aways of cyclists who were not considered relevant for the final victory; sixth-placed Charly Mottet was the only cyclist in the top 15 who had real chances of finishing high.

The tenth stage was an individual time trial, and the first real test for the favourites. It was won by Stephen Roche, with Mottet in second place; Mottet became the new leader of the general classification. After a successful escape in the eleventh stage, Martial Gayant became the new leader. The twelfth stage ended in a bunch sprint that did not change the general classification. The Tour arrived in the Pyrenees in the thirteenth stage. Non-climbers, such as Gayant lost more than fifteen minutes, and so the non-climbers were removed from the top positions of the general classification; the new top three was Mottet – Bernard – Roche, all serious contenders for the final victory.

The eighteenth stage was an individual time trial, with a finish on the Mont Ventoux. It was won with a great margin by Jean-François Bernard, who became the new leader of the general classification, and the new hope of the French cycling fans. Bernard was a good climber and a good time-trialist, and had the support of a good team, so he could be able to stay leader until the end of the race. But already in the next stage, Bernard lost considerable time. He had a flat tire just before the top of a climb, and lost contact with the other riders while he had to wait for repairs, and had to spend energy to get back. His rivals Mottet and Roche had made a plan to attack in the feed zone, where cyclists could get their lunch. Mottet and Roche had packed extra food at the start of the stage, and attacked while Bernard was at the back of the peloton. Bernard chased them, but was not able to get back to them, and lost four minutes in that stage, which made Roche the new leader, closely followed by Mottet and Delgado.

In the twentieth stage, the riders went through the Alps, to finish on the Alpe d'Huez. Roche finished in fifteenth place, and lost the lead to Delgado. The pivotal stage was stage 21. In the first part of this stage, the Colombian cyclists of the "Café de Colombia" team (including Luis Herrera and Fabio Parra, fifth and sixth in the general classification) kept a high pace, and many cyclists were dropped. Roche, Delgado and Mottet decided to work together to get rid of the Colombian cyclists on the descent of the Galibier, out of fear that Herrera and Parra would leave them behind in the next climbs. Their plan worked, but Delgado's teammates were also dropped. Roche saw this opportunity and escaped, climbing the Madeleine in a small breakaway group. Somewhat later, Delgado's teammates got back to Delgado, and together they chased Roche, and caught him just before the climb of La Plagne. Roche then anticipated that Delgado would keep attacking on the climb. Knowing Delgado was the better climber, Roche decided he would not follow Delgado's attack. Instead, he let Delgado get away until the margin was one minute, giving Delgado the impression that he could safely save energy for the next stages, and at the last part of the stage gave it everything he had to reduce the margin. Roche followed that tactic, and confused not only Delgado, but also the commentators and the Tour organisation. Roche finished a few seconds behind Delgado, and after the finish he collapsed and was given an oxygen mask in an ambulance.

Roche was only 39 seconds behind Delgado in the general classification. Roche could still win the Tour, but it depended on if he could recover in time for the 22nd stage. That stage included the last serious climb of the Tour, so Delgado had his final opportunity to gain time on Roche, and he attacked. However, Roche was able to come back to Delgado twice. Then, Roche attacked, and Delgado could not keep up. Roche won back 18 seconds on Delgado, so he had reduced his margin to 21 seconds. Being a talented time-trialist, he knew that he could easily make up for it on the penultimate stage (an individual time trial at Dijon). Indeed, Roche won almost a minute on Delgado, and this was enough to secure the overall win. This time trial was won by Jean-François Bernard finished the Tour in third place after losing four minutes after the flat tire in the nineteenth stage.

=== Doping ===
Bontempi was originally declared winner of the 7th stage, but a few days later, his doping test came back positive for testosterone. Bontempi was set back to the last place of the stage, was penalised with 10 minutes in the general classification, and received a provisional suspension of one month.

One day later, it became public that Dietrich Thurau had tested positive after the eighth stage. At that point, Thurau had already left the race. He was set back to the last place of that stage, and also received a provisional suspension of one month.

The third rider to test positive was Silvano Contini, after the thirteenth stage. He received the same penalty.

== Classification leadership and minor prizes ==
There were several classifications in the 1987 Tour de France, six of them awarding jerseys to their leaders. The most important was the general classification, calculated by adding each cyclist's finishing times on each stage. The cyclist with the least accumulated time was the race leader, identified by the yellow jersey; the winner of this classification is considered the winner of the Tour.

Additionally, there was a points classification, where cyclists were given points for finishing among the best in a stage finish, or in intermediate sprints. The cyclist with the most points lead the classification, and was identified with a green jersey.

There was also a mountains classification. The organisation had categorised some climbs as either hors catégorie, first, second, third, or fourth-category; points for this classification were won by the first cyclists that reached the top of these climbs first, with more points available for the higher-categorised climbs. The cyclist with the most points lead the classification, and wore a white jersey with red polka dots.

There was also a combination classification. This classification was calculated as a combination of the other classifications, its leader wore the combination jersey.

Another classification was the intermediate sprints classification. This classification had similar rules as the points classification, but only points were awarded on intermediate sprints. Its leader wore a red jersey.

The sixth individual classification was the young rider classification. This was decided the same way as the general classification, but only riders under 26 years were eligible, and the leader wore a white jersey. In 1987 the race organisers changed the rules for the young rider classification; from 1983 to 1986, this classification had been as a "debutant classification", open for cyclist that rode the Tour for the first time. In 1987, the organisers decided that the classification should be open to all cyclists less than 25 years of age at 1 January of the year.

For the team classification, the times of the best three cyclists per team on each stage were added; the leading team was the team with the lowest total time. The riders in the team that led this classification were identified by yellow caps. There was also a team points classification. Cyclists received points according to their finishing position on each stage, with the first rider receiving one point. The first three finishers of each team had their points combined, and the team with the fewest points led the classification. The riders of the team leading this classification wore green caps.

In addition, there was a combativity award, in which a jury composed of journalists gave points after each mass-start stage to the cyclist they considered most combative. The split stages each had a combined winner. At the conclusion of the Tour, Régis Clère won the overall super-combativity award, also decided by journalists. The Souvenir Henri Desgrange was given in honour of Tour founder Henri Desgrange to the first rider to pass the summit of the Col du Galibier on stage 21. This prize was won by Pedro Muñoz Machín Rodríguez.

Classification leadership table
Stage	Stage winner	General classification	Points classification	Mountains classification	Young rider classification	Combination classification	Intermediate sprints classification	Team classifications		Combativity award
Stage	Stage winner	General classification	Points classification	Mountains classification	Young rider classification	Combination classification	Intermediate sprints classification	By time	By points	Combativity award
P	Jelle Nijdam	Jelle Nijdam	Jelle Nijdam	no award	Jelle Nijdam	Lech Piasecki	Jean-Claude Colotti	Carrera Jeans–Vagabond	Carrera Jeans–Vagabond	no award
1	Nico Verhoeven	Lech Piasecki	Lech Piasecki	Gilbert Duclos-Lassalle	Jelle Nijdam	Gilbert Duclos-Lassalle	Jean-Claude Colotti	Roland–Skala	Roland–Skala	Giovanni Bottoia
2	Carrera Jeans–Vagabond	Lech Piasecki	Lech Piasecki	Gilbert Duclos-Lassalle	Erik Breukink	Dietrich Thurau	Guido Bontempi	Carrera Jeans–Vagabond	Roland–Skala	no award
3	Acácio da Silva	Erich Maechler	Dietrich Thurau	Frédéric Brun	Bruno Cornillet	Dietrich Thurau	Jean-Claude Colotti	Système U	Roland–Skala	Frédéric Brun
4	Herman Frison	Erich Maechler	Dietrich Thurau	Frédéric Brun	Bruno Cornillet	Dietrich Thurau	Jean-Claude Colotti	Système U	Roland–Skala	Herman Frison
5	Marc Sergeant	Erich Maechler	Jörg Müller	Frédéric Brun	Bruno Cornillet	Christophe Lavainne	Jean-Claude Colotti	Système U	Roland–Skala	Yvon Madiot
6	Christophe Lavainne	Erich Maechler	Bruno Wojtinek	Hendrik Devos	Christophe Lavainne	Christophe Lavainne	Jean-Claude Colotti	Système U	Roland–Skala	Jean-Claude Bagot
7	Manuel Jorge Domínguez	Erich Maechler	Jean-Paul van Poppel	Raúl Alcalá	Christophe Lavainne	Christophe Lavainne	Jean-Claude Colotti	Système U	Roland–Skala	Régis Clère
8	Jean-Paul van Poppel	Erich Maechler	Jean-Paul van Poppel	Raúl Alcalá	Christophe Lavainne	Christophe Lavainne	Jean-Claude Colotti	Système U	Roland–Skala	Julio César Cadena
9	Adri van der Poel	Erich Maechler	Jean-Paul van Poppel	Raúl Alcalá	Christophe Lavainne	Christophe Lavainne	Jean-Claude Colotti	Système U	Roland–Skala	Adri van der Poel
10	Stephen Roche	Charly Mottet	Jean-Paul van Poppel	Raúl Alcalá	Bruno Cornillet	Christophe Lavainne	Jean-Claude Colotti	Système U	Roland–Skala	no award
11	Martial Gayant	Martial Gayant	Jean-Paul van Poppel	Raúl Alcalá	Bruno Cornillet	Christophe Lavainne	Jean-Claude Colotti	Système U	PDM–Ultima–Concorde	Jan Nevens
12	Davis Phinney	Martial Gayant	Jean-Paul van Poppel	Raúl Alcalá	Bruno Cornillet	Jean-François Bernard	Jean-Claude Colotti	Système U	PDM–Ultima–Concorde	Phil Anderson
13	Erik Breukink	Charly Mottet	Jean-Paul van Poppel	Raúl Alcalá	Erik Breukink	Jean-François Bernard	Jean-Claude Colotti	Système U	Panasonic–Isostar	Robert Forest
14	Dag Otto Lauritzen	Charly Mottet	Jean-Paul van Poppel	Luis Herrera	Raúl Alcalá	Jean-François Bernard	Jean-Claude Colotti	Système U	7-Eleven	Thierry Claveyrolat
15	Rolf Gölz	Charly Mottet	Jean-Paul van Poppel	Luis Herrera	Raúl Alcalá	Jean-François Bernard	Gilbert Duclos-Lassalle	Système U	PDM–Ultima–Concorde	Roland Le Clerc
16	Régis Clère	Charly Mottet	Jean-Paul van Poppel	Raúl Alcalá	Raúl Alcalá	Jean-François Bernard	Gilbert Duclos-Lassalle	Système U	7-Eleven	Régis Clère
17	Jean-Paul van Poppel	Charly Mottet	Jean-Paul van Poppel	Luis Herrera	Raúl Alcalá	Jean-François Bernard	Gilbert Duclos-Lassalle	Système U	PDM–Ultima–Concorde	Bernard Vallet
18	Jean-François Bernard	Jean-François Bernard	Jean-Paul van Poppel	Luis Herrera	Raúl Alcalá	Jean-François Bernard	Gilbert Duclos-Lassalle	Système U	7-Eleven	no award
19	Pedro Delgado	Stephen Roche	Jean-Paul van Poppel	Luis Herrera	Raúl Alcalá	Jean-François Bernard	Gilbert Duclos-Lassalle	Système U	PDM–Ultima–Concorde	Stephen Roche
20	Federico Echave	Pedro Delgado	Jean-Paul van Poppel	Luis Herrera	Raúl Alcalá	Jean-François Bernard	Gilbert Duclos-Lassalle	Système U	7-Eleven	Federico Echave
21	Laurent Fignon	Pedro Delgado	Jean-Paul van Poppel	Luis Herrera	Raúl Alcalá	Jean-François Bernard	Gilbert Duclos-Lassalle	Système U	7-Eleven	Anselmo Fuerte
22	Eduardo Chozas	Pedro Delgado	Stephen Roche	Luis Herrera	Raúl Alcalá	Jean-François Bernard	Gilbert Duclos-Lassalle	Système U	Système U	Eduardo Chozas
23	Régis Clère	Pedro Delgado	Jean-Paul van Poppel	Luis Herrera	Raúl Alcalá	Jean-François Bernard	Gilbert Duclos-Lassalle	Système U	Système U	Marc Gomez
24	Jean-François Bernard	Stephen Roche	Stephen Roche	Luis Herrera	Raúl Alcalá	Jean-François Bernard	Gilbert Duclos-Lassalle	Système U	Système U	no award
25	Jeff Pierce	Stephen Roche	Jean-Paul van Poppel	Luis Herrera	Raúl Alcalá	Jean-François Bernard	Gilbert Duclos-Lassalle	Système U	Système U	no award
Final		Stephen Roche	Jean-Paul van Poppel	Luis Herrera	Raúl Alcalá	Jean-François Bernard	Gilbert Duclos-Lassalle	Système U	Système U	Régis Clère

- In stage 19, Stephen Roche wore the combination jersey.

== Final standings ==
Legend
A yellow jersey.	Denotes the winner of the general classification	A green jersey.	Denotes the winner of the points classification
A white jersey with red polka dots.	Denotes the winner of the mountains classification	A white jersey.	Denotes the winner of the young rider classification
A multi-coloured jersey.	Denotes the winner of the combination classification	A red jersey.	Denotes the winner of the intermediate sprints classification

=== General classification ===
Final general classification (1–10)
Rank	Rider	Team	Time
1	Stephen Roche (IRE)	Carrera Jeans–Vagabond	115h 27' 42"
2	Pedro Delgado (ESP)	PDM–Ultima–Concorde	+ 0' 40"
3	Jean-François Bernard (FRA)	Toshiba–Look	+ 2' 13"
4	Charly Mottet (FRA)	Système U	+ 6' 40"
5	Luis Herrera (COL)	Café de Colombia–Varta	+ 9' 32"
6	Fabio Parra (COL)	Café de Colombia–Varta	+ 16' 53"
7	Laurent Fignon (FRA)	Système U	+ 18' 24"
8	Anselmo Fuerte (ESP)	BH	+ 18' 33"
9	Raúl Alcalá (MEX)	7-Eleven	+ 21' 49"
10	Marino Lejarreta (ESP)	Caja Rural–Orbea	+ 26' 13"

Final general classification (11–135)
Rank	Rider	Team	Time
11	Claude Criquielion (BEL)	Hitachi–Marc	+ 30' 32"
12	Federico Echave (ESP)	BH	+ 31' 06"
13	Martín Ramírez (COL)	Café de Colombia–Varta	+ 36' 55"
14	Gerhard Zadrobilek (AUT)	Supermercati Brianzoli–Chateau d'Ax	+ 40' 35"
15	Luciano Loro (ITA)	Del Tongo	+ 43' 52"
16	Andrew Hampsten (USA)	7-Eleven	+ 44' 07"
17	Jean-René Bernaudeau (FRA)	Fagor–MBK	+ 47' 16"
18	Rafaël Antonio Acevedo (COL)	Café de Colombia–Varta	+ 50' 33"
19	Robert Millar (GBR)	Panasonic–Isostar	+ 50' 47"
20	Denis Roux (FRA)	Vétements Z–Peugeot	+ 52' 13"
21	Erik Breukink (NED)	Panasonic–Isostar	+ 53' 35"
22	Pedro Muñoz Machín Rodríguez (ESP)	Fagor–MBK	+ 59' 27"
23	Éric Caritoux (FRA)	Fagor–MBK	+ 1h 05' 33"
24	Omar Pablo Hernandez (COL)	Postobón–Manzana–Ryalcao	+ 1h 14' 10"
25	Eduardo Chozas (ESP)	Teka	+ 1h 14' 59"
26	Beat Breu (SUI)	Joker–Merckx	+ 1h 20' 02"
27	Phil Anderson (AUS)	Panasonic–Isostar	+ 1h 20' 43"
28	Gilles Sanders (FRA)	Kas	+ 1h 20' 57"
29	Jesper Skibby (DEN)	Roland–Skala	+ 1h 21' 13"
30	Eddy Schepers (BEL)	Carrera Jeans–Vagabond	+ 1h 22' 13"
31	Guido Van Calster (BEL)	BH	+ 1h 26' 47"
32	Gilles Mas (FRA)	RMO–Cycles Méral–Mavic	+ 1h 26' 48"
33	Jean-Claude Bagot (FRA)	Fagor–MBK	+ 1h 27' 16"
34	Martial Gayant (FRA)	Système U	+ 1h 29' 17"
35	José Salvador Sanchis (ESP)	Caja Rural–Orbea	+ 1h 30' 06"
36	Juan Carlos Castillo (COL)	Café de Colombia–Varta	+ 1h 33' 01"
37	Bruno Cornillet (FRA)	Vétements Z–Peugeot	+ 1h 33' 37"
38	Robert Forest (FRA)	Fagor–MBK	+ 1h 35' 04"
39	Dag Otto Lauritzen (NOR)	7-Eleven	+ 1h 35' 52"
40	Christophe Lavainne (FRA)	Système U	+ 1h 36' 12"
41	Jokin Mújika (ESP)	Caja Rural–Orbea	+ 1h 36' 15"
42	Jérôme Simon (FRA)	Vétements Z–Peugeot	+ 1h 36' 25"
43	José Luis Laguía (ESP)	PDM–Ultima–Concorde	+ 1h 38' 27"
44	Marco Antonio León (COL)	Café de Colombia–Varta	+ 1h 39' 40"
45	Peter Stevenhaagen (NED)	PDM–Ultima–Concorde	+ 1h 41' 50"
46	Julio-César Cadena (COL)	Café de Colombia–Varta	+ 1h 44' 11"
47	Marc Madiot (FRA)	Système U	+ 1h 46' 46"
48	Gert-Jan Theunisse (NED)	PDM–Ultima–Concorde	+ 1h 53' 05"
49	Rolf Gölz (FRG)	Superconfex–Kwantum–Yoko–Colnago	+ 1h 54' 24"
50	Jean-Claude Leclercq (FRA)	Toshiba–Look	+ 1h 54' 40"
51	Fabian Fuchs (SUI)	Hitachi–Marc	+ 1h 55' 11"
52	Roque de la Cruz (ESP)	Caja Rural–Orbea	+ 1h 55' 36"
53	Pascal Simon (FRA)	Vétements Z–Peugeot	+ 1h 58' 19"
54	Dominique Garde (FRA)	Toshiba–Look	+ 1h 59' 04"
55	Silvano Contini (ITA)	Del Tongo	+ 1h 59' 15"
56	Eric Van Lancker (BEL)	Panasonic–Isostar	+ 1h 59' 46"
57	Bernard Gavillet (SUI)	Système U	+ 2h 00' 18"
58	Enrique Aja (ESP)	Teka	+ 2h 00' 48"
59	Charly Berard (FRA)	Toshiba–Look	+ 2h 01' 31"
60	Bernard Vallet (FRA)	RMO–Cycles Méral–Mavic	+ 2h 04' 39"
61	Guy Nulens (BEL)	Panasonic–Isostar	+ 2h 05' 46"
62	Kim Andersen (DEN)	Toshiba–Look	+ 2h 05' 48"
63	Nestor Oswaldo Mora (COL)	Postobón–Manzana–Ryalcao	+ 2h 06' 07"
64	Acácio da Silva (POR)	Kas	+ 2h 13' 27"
65	Martin Earley (IRE)	Fagor–MBK	+ 2h 14' 22"
66	Philippe Bouvatier (FRA)	BH	+ 2h 15' 50"
67	Pascal Poisson (FRA)	Système U	+ 2h 16' 05"
68	Jørgen V. Pedersen (DEN)	Carrera Jeans–Vagabond	+ 2h 16' 45"
69	Argemiro Bohórquez (COL)	Café de Colombia–Varta	+ 2h 18' 55"
70	Adrian Timmis (GBR)	ANC–Halfords	+ 2h 19' 21"
71	Jos Haex (BEL)	Hitachi–Marc	+ 2h 20' 49"
72	Régis Clère (FRA)	Teka	+ 2h 21' 21"
73	Yvon Madiot (FRA)	Système U	+ 2h 21' 57"
74	Steve Bauer (CAN)	Toshiba–Look	+ 2h 24' 41"
75	François Lemarchand (FRA)	Fagor–MBK	+ 2h 26' 57"
76	Jean-Philippe Vandenbrande (BEL)	Hitachi–Marc	+ 2h 28' 58"
77	Jean-François Rault (FRA)	RMO–Cycles Méral–Mavic	+ 2h 30' 06"
78	Jesús Rodríguez (ESP)	Teka	+ 2h 30' 08"
79	Marc Gomez (FRA)	Reynolds	+ 2h 31' 00"
80	Gilbert Duclos-Lassalle (FRA)	Vétements Z–Peugeot	+ 2h 31' 21"
81	Alessandro Pozzi (ITA)	Del Tongo	+ 2h 31' 48"
82	Ron Kiefel (USA)	7-Eleven	+ 2h 33' 34"
83	Julián Gorospe (ESP)	Reynolds	+ 2h 36' 11"
84	Teun van Vliet (NED)	Panasonic–Isostar	+ 2h 39' 34"
85	Erich Mächler (SUI)	Carrera Jeans–Vagabond	+ 2h 40' 01"
86	Alfred Achermann (SUI)	Kas	+ 2h 41' 36"
87	Thierry Marie (FRA)	Système U	+ 2h 42' 01"
88	Jeff Pierce (USA)	7-Eleven	+ 2h 42' 22"
89	Gerrie Knetemann (NED)	PDM–Ultima–Concorde	+ 2h 43' 07"
90	Raimund Dietzen (FRG)	Teka	+ 2h 43' 19"
91	Theo de Rooij (NED)	Panasonic–Isostar	+ 2h 43' 43"
92	Frédéric Brun (FRA)	Vétements Z–Peugeot	+ 2h 44' 32"
93	Stefan Morjean (BEL)	Hitachi–Marc	+ 2h 47' 55"
94	Malcolm Elliott (GBR)	ANC–Halfords	+ 2h 48' 39"
95	Henk Lubberding (NED)	Panasonic–Isostar	+ 2h 51' 08"
96	Ludo Peeters (BEL)	Superconfex–Kwantum–Yoko–Colnago	+ 2h 52' 45"
97	Miguel Induráin (ESP)	Reynolds	+ 2h 53' 11"
98	Jonathan Boyer (USA)	7-Eleven	+ 2h 53' 47"
99	Jörg Müller (SUI)	PDM–Ultima–Concorde	+ 2h 54' 04"
100	Celestino Prieto (ESP)	Kas	+ 2h 55' 02"
101	Cristóbal Pérez (COL)	Café de Colombia–Varta	+ 2h 58' 20"
102	Giancarlo Perini (ITA)	Carrera Jeans–Vagabond	+ 2h 58' 38"
103	Kvetoslav Palov (AUS)	ANC–Halfords	+ 2h 59' 04"
104	Luc Roosen (BEL)	Superconfex–Kwantum–Yoko–Colnago	+ 2h 59' 30"
105	Adri van der Poel (NED)	PDM–Ultima–Concorde	+ 2h 59' 44"
106	Peter Hilse (FRG)	Teka	+ 3h 01' 26"
107	Roland Le Clerc (FRA)	Caja Rural–Orbea	+ 3h 03' 04"
108	Jesús Hernández (ESP)	Reynolds	+ 3h 04' 09"
109	Massimo Ghirotto (ITA)	Carrera Jeans–Vagabond	+ 3h 04' 57"
110	Brian Holm (DEN)	Roland–Skala	+ 3h 08' 13"
111	Davide Cassani (ITA)	Carrera Jeans–Vagabond	+ 3h 10' 33"
112	Guido Winterberg (SUI)	Toshiba–Look	+ 3h 12' 26"
113	José Luis Navarro (ESP)	BH	+ 3h 12' 38"
114	Pascal Jules (FRA)	Caja Rural–Orbea	+ 3h 12' 47"
115	Michel Dernies (BEL)	Joker–Merckx	+ 3h 12' 53"
116	Rudy Patry (BEL)	Roland–Skala	+ 3h 14' 45"
117	Francisco-José Antequera (ESP)	BH	+ 3h 16' 13"
118	Manuel Jorge Domínguez (ESP)	BH	+ 3h 16' 38"
119	Guido Bontempi (ITA)	Carrera Jeans–Vagabond	+ 3h 16' 41"
120	Maurizio Piovani (ITA)	Del Tongo	+ 3h 18' 57"
121	Jan Wijnants (BEL)	Hitachi–Marc	+ 3h 19' 19"
122	Herman Frison (BEL)	Roland–Skala	+ 3h 19' 37"
123	André Chappuis (FRA)	RMO–Cycles Méral–Mavic	+ 3h 21' 18"
124	Jelle Nijdam (NED)	Superconfex–Kwantum–Yoko–Colnago	+ 3h 21' 18"
125	Patrick Verschueren (BEL)	Roland–Skala	+ 3h 23' 05"
126	Willem Van Eynde (BEL)	Joker–Merckx	+ 3h 23' 40"
127	Gerrit Solleveld (NED)	Superconfex–Kwantum–Yoko–Colnago	+ 3h 24' 21"
128	Carlos Hernández (ESP)	Teka	+ 3h 24' 41"
129	Stefano Allocchio (ITA)	Supermercati Brianzoli–Chateau d'Ax	+ 3h 32' 56"
130	Jean-Paul van Poppel (NED)	Superconfex–Kwantum–Yoko–Colnago	+ 3h 36' 05"
131	Jan Goessens (BEL)	Joker–Merckx	+ 3h 36' 30"
132	Jozef Lieckens (BEL)	Joker–Merckx	+ 3h 49' 48"
133	Guy Gallopin (FRA)	ANC–Halfords	+ 4h 03' 13"
134	Jean-Louis Gauthier (FRA)	Vétements Z–Peugeot	+ 4h 05' 18"
135	Mathieu Hermans (NED)	Caja Rural–Orbea	+ 4h 23' 30"

=== Points classification ===
Final points classification (1–10)
Rank	Rider	Team	Points
1	Jean-Paul van Poppel (NED)	Superconfex–Kwantum–Yoko–Colnago	263
2	Stephen Roche (IRE)	Carrera Jeans–Vagabond	247
3	Pedro Delgado (ESP)	PDM–Ultima–Concorde	228
4	Jean-François Bernard (FRA)	Toshiba–Look	201
5	Jozef Lieckens (BEL)	Joker–Merckx	195
6	Luis Herrera (COL)	Café de Colombia–Varta	174
7	Charly Mottet (FRA)	Système U	153
8	Anselmo Fuerte (ESP)	BH	135
9	Raúl Alcalá (MEX)	7-Eleven	129
10	Fabio Parra (COL)	Café de Colombia–Varta	128

=== Mountains classification ===
Final mountains classification (1–10)
Rank	Rider	Team	Points
1	Luis Herrera (COL)	Café de Colombia–Varta	452
2	Anselmo Fuerte (ESP)	BH	314
3	Raúl Alcalá (MEX)	7-Eleven	277
4	Pedro Delgado (ESP)	PDM–Ultima–Concorde	224
5	Fabio Parra (COL)	Café de Colombia–Varta	180
6	Stephen Roche (IRE)	Carrera Jeans–Vagabond	173
7	Jean-François Bernard (FRA)	Toshiba–Look	170
8	Jesús Hernández Úbeda (ESP)	Reynolds	147
9	Laurent Fignon (FRA)	Système U	137
10	Federico Echave (ESP)	BH	132

=== Young rider classification ===
Final young rider classification (1–10)
Rank	Rider	Team	Time
1	Raúl Alcalá (MEX)	7-Eleven	115h 49' 31"
2	Erik Breukink (NED)	Panasonic–Isostar	+ 31' 46"
3	Gilles Sanders (FRA)	Kas	+ 59' 08"
4	Jesper Skibby (DEN)	Roland–Skala	+ 59' 24"
5	José Salvador Sanchis (ESP)	Caja Rural–Orbea	+ 1h 08' 17"
6	Juan Carlos Castillo (COL)	Café de Colombia–Varta	+ 1h 11' 12"
7	Bruno Cornillet (FRA)	Vétements Z–Peugeot	+ 1h 11' 48"
8	Christophe Lavainne (FRA)	Système U	+ 1h 14' 23"
9	Peter Stevenhaagen (NED)	PDM–Ultima–Concorde	+ 1h 20' 01"
10	Julio César Cadena (COL)	Café de Colombia	+ 1h 22' 22"

=== Combination classification ===
Final combination classification (1–5)
Rank	Rider	Team	Points
1	Jean-François Bernard (FRA)	Toshiba–Look	72
2	Laurent Fignon (FRA)	Système U	70
3	Stephen Roche (IRE)	Carrera Jeans–Vagabond	69
4	Luis Herrera (COL)	Café de Colombia–Varta	65
5	Anselmo Fuerte (ESP)	BH	65

=== Intermediate sprints classification ===
Final intermediate sprints classification (1–10)
Rank	Rider	Team	Points
1	Gilbert Duclos-Lassalle (FRA)	Vétements Z–Peugeot	249
2	Jean-Paul van Poppel (NED)	Superconfex–Kwantum–Yoko–Colnago	178
3	Régis Clère (FRA)	Teka	142
4	Martin Earley (IRE)	Fagor–MBK	100
5	Teun van Vliet (NED)	Panasonic–Isostar	70
6	Jean-Claude Leclercq (FRA)	Toshiba–Look	55
7	Guido Bontempi (ITA)	Carrera Jeans–Vagabond	52
8	Laurent Fignon (FRA)	Système U	52
9	Frédéric Brun (FRA)	Vétements Z–Peugeot	51
10	Jozef Lieckens (BEL)	Joker–Merckx	35

=== Team classification ===
Final team classification (1–10)
Rank	Team	Time
1	Système U	346h 44' 02"
2	Café de Colombia–Varta	+ 38' 20"
3	BH	+ 56' 02"
4	Fagor–MBK	+ 1h 07' 54"
5	Toshiba–Look	+ 1h 28' 54"
6	PDM–Ultima–Concorde	+ 1h 34' 11"
7	Carrera Jeans–Vagabond	+ 1h 41' 42"
8	Panasonic–Isostar	+ 1h 47' 02"
9	7-Eleven	+ 1h 53' 11"
10	Caja Rural–Orbea	+ 2h 22' 44"

=== Team points classification ===
Final team points classification (1–10)
Rank	Team	Points
1	Système U	1790
2	PDM–Ultima–Concorde	1804
3	7-Eleven	1821
4	Panasonic–Isostar	1863
5	BH	2670
6	Carrera Jeans–Vagabond	2718
7	Hitachi–Marc	2766
8	Vétements Z–Peugeot	2813
9	Toshiba–Look	2828
10	Fagor–MBK	3057

== Aftermath ==
After the Giro-Tour double victory, Roche would complete the Triple Crown of Cycling by winning the 1987 road race world championship.

Jeff Pierce winning the final stage on the Champs-Élysées is thought to have impressed the presence of United States cycling in the European circuit. Cycling News's Pat Malach wrote that Pierce's win was his defining win for the remainder of his career.

== Bibliography ==
- Augendre, Jacques (2016). Guide historique [Historical guide] (PDF) (in French). Paris: Amaury Sport Organisation. Archived (PDF) from the original on 17 August 2016.
- L'Équipe; Leblanc, Jean-Marie; Armstrong, Lance (2003). The Official Tour de France Centennial 1903–2003. London: Weidenfeld & Nicolson. ISBN 978-0-297-84358-0.
- Martin, Pierre (1987). Tour 87: The Stories of the 1987 Tour of Italy and Tour de France. With contributions from: Penazzo, Sergio; Baratino, Dante; Schamps, Daniel; Vos, Cor. Keighley, UK: Kennedy Brothers Publishing. OCLC 810684532.
- McGann, Bill; McGann, Carol (2008). The Story of the Tour de France: 1965–2007. Vol. 2. Indianapolis: Dog Ear Publishing. ISBN 978-1-59858-608-4.
- Nauright, John; Parrish, Charles (2012). Sports Around the World: History, Culture, and Practice. Vol. 2. Santa Barbara, California: ABC-CLIO. ISBN 978-1-59884-300-2.
- van den Akker, Pieter (2018). Tour de France Rules and Statistics: 1903–2018. Self-published. ISBN 978-1-79398-080-9.
