= Triple Crown of Cycling =

Achievement in road bicycle racing

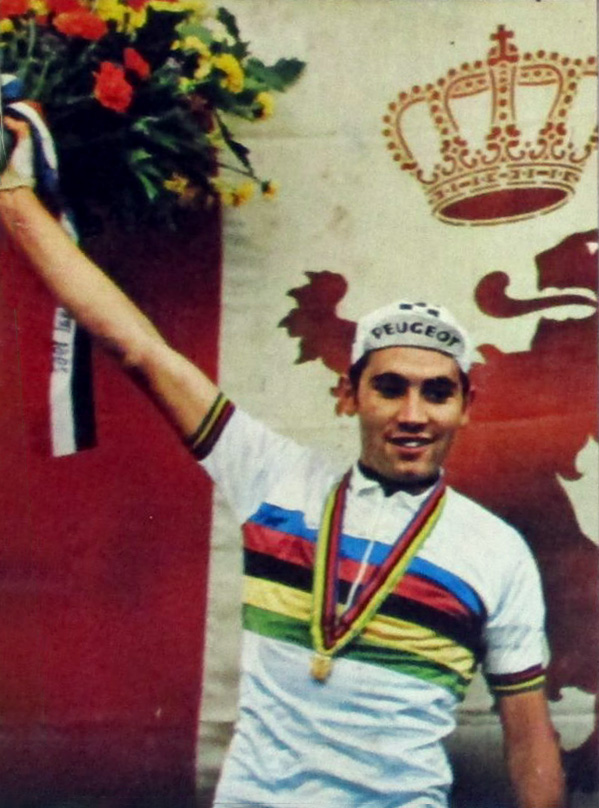
(Belgium) Eddy Merckx

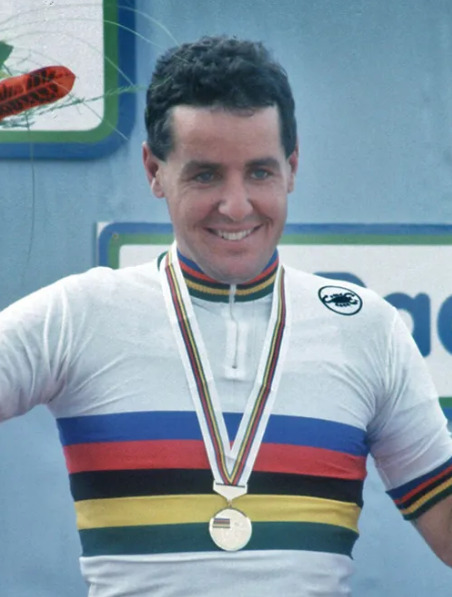
(Republic of Ireland) Stephen Roche

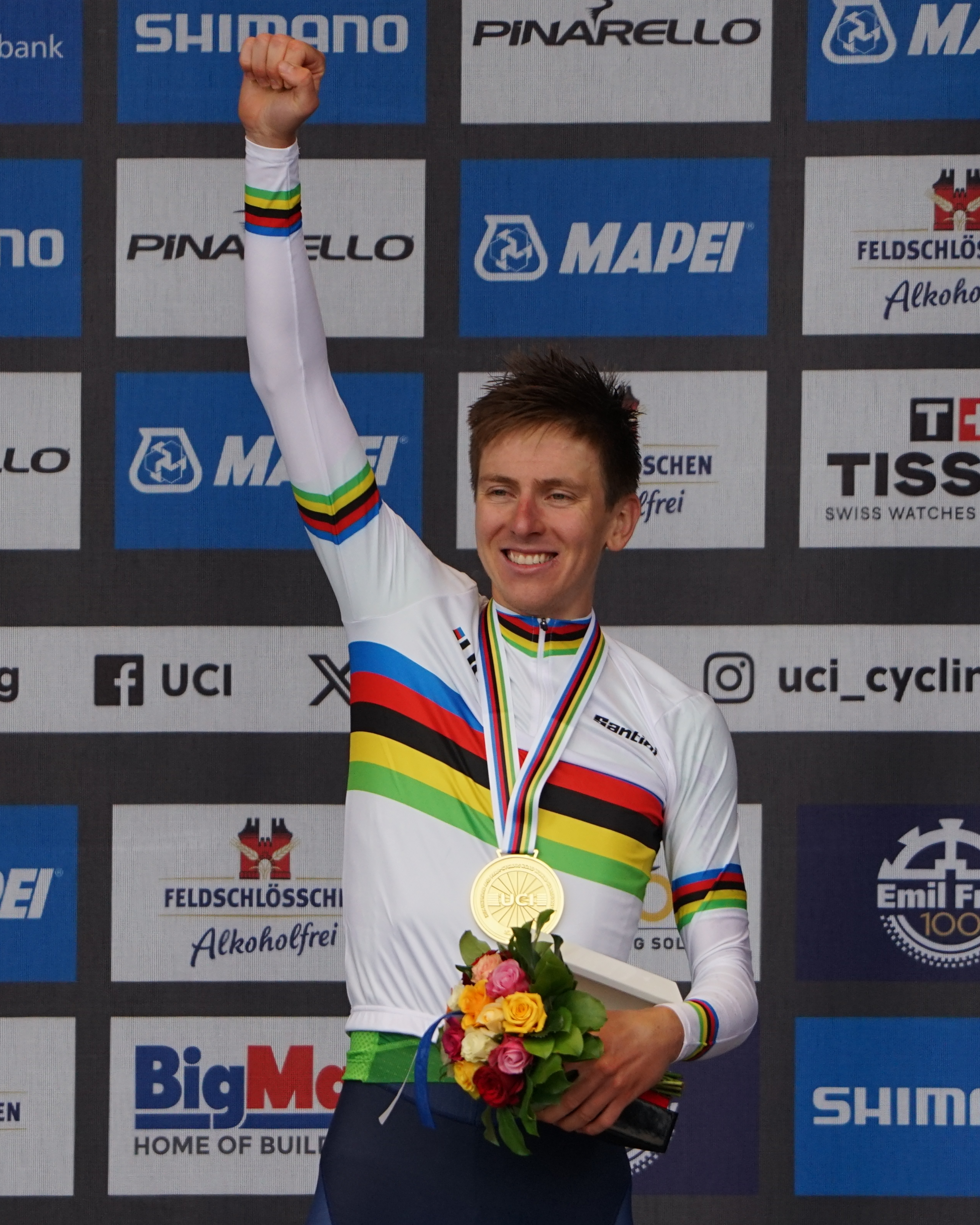
(Slovenia) Tadej Pogačar

The Triple Crown of Cycling in road bicycle racing denotes the achievement of winning three major titles in the same season: the UCI Road World Championships Road Race, the Tour de France general classification, and the Giro d'Italia general classification. It is considered one of the most difficult and prestigious achievements in the sport, with journalists calling it "cycling's most elite club" and "all but impossible in the modern age".

The men's triple crown has been achieved by three riders: Eddy Merckx in 1974, Stephen Roche in 1987 and Tadej Pogačar in 2024.

In women's cycling, where there are no three-week grand tours, the definition can vary between sources. Annemiek van Vleuten and Demi Vollering are widely credited as achieving a comparable triple crown in 2022 and 2026, when they won the Tour de France Femmes, Giro d'Italia Women and the World Championship Road Race. The term "triple crown" is occasionally used more broadly; van Vleuten also won the 2022 Challenge by La Vuelta (the predecessor to the La Vuelta Femenina), sweeping the three major women's tours in a single year, an achievement sometimes referred to as a triple crown.

The phrase "triple crown" is occasionally used for other feats as well, such as winning all three Grand Tours over a rider's career, winning consecutive Grand Tours, or winning world championships across different disciplines of cycling.

Despite the prestige and recognition associated with these achievements, the Triple Crown of Cycling is not an official title awarded by cycling's governing bodies, and there is no physical award for its accomplishment.

== Other definitions ==
=== Career triple crown ===
Only seven riders have won all three races that make up the triple crown (UCI Road World Championships road race, the Tour de France, and the Giro d'Italia): Merckx, Roche, Pogačar, Van Vleuten and Vollering, who each won the triple crown in a single season, and also Fausto Coppi, Felice Gimondi and Bernard Hinault; these last three are said to have completed a career triple crown.

Key
| Bold | **Bold** indicates the win that achieved a career triple crown. |

Men's career triple crown winners
| Cyclist | Tour de France wins | Giro d'Italia wins | World Championship wins |
|---|---|---|---|
| Fausto Coppi (ITA) | 1949, 1952 | 1940, 1947, 1949, 1952, 1953 | **1953** |
| Eddy Merckx (BEL) | **1969**, 1970, 1971, 1972, 1974 | 1968, 1970, 1972, 1973, 1974 | 1967, 1971, 1974 |
| Felice Gimondi (ITA) | 1965 | 1967, 1969, 1976 | **1973** |
| Bernard Hinault (FRA) | 1978, 1979, 1981, 1982, 1985 | 1980, 1982, 1985 | **1980** |
| Stephen Roche (IRL) | 1987 | 1987 | **1987** |
| Tadej Pogačar (SLO) | 2020, 2021, 2024, 2025, 2026 | 2024 | **2024**, 2025 |

Women's career triple crown winners
| Cyclist | Tour de France Femmes wins | Giro d'Italia Women wins | World Championship wins |
|---|---|---|---|
| Annemiek van Vleuten (NED) | **2022** | 2018, 2019, 2022, 2023 | 2019, 2022 |
| Demi Vollering (NED) | 2023, 2026 | 2026 | **2026** |

=== Grand Tours ===
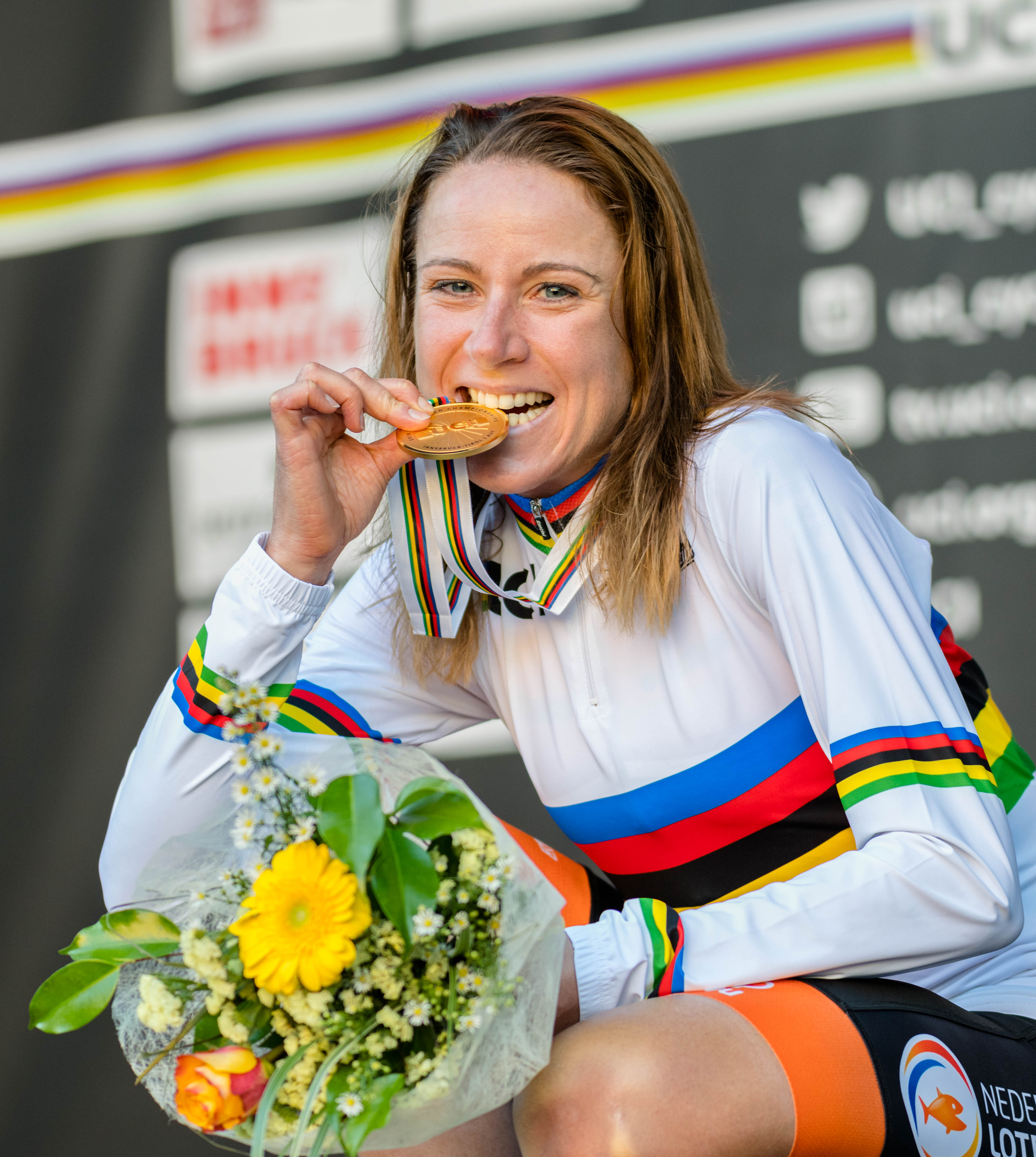
Annemiek van Vleuten is credited with winning a "triple crown" or "grand tour triple" in 2022. (pictured in 2018)

The Grand Tours are a set of stage races: the Tour de France, the Giro d'Italia, and the Vuelta a España. These races have special status in Union Cycliste Internationale (UCI) regulations, as they award the most UCI points and are the only races longer than 14 days. Eight male riders have won all three races across their careers—an achievement some sources have called a "triple crown". Cycling journalist Matthew Hansen has argued that a single-season sweep of the Grand Tours should replace the traditional Tour-Giro-World Championship definition, noting that historical scheduling conflicts that once made combining the Giro and Vuelta difficult no longer apply. No rider has ever achieved this hypothetical single-season sweep, but three men—Eddy Merckx, Bernard Hinault and Chris Froome—have won all three Grand Tours in a row, split over calendar years. Some sources have called this feat, holding the titles of all three races at the same time, a "triple crown of wins" or "cycling's triple crown".

In women's cycling, the Grand Tour label is debated, as the major stage races have a less consistent history and are considerably shorter. The Giro d'Italia Women is the most established, first held in 1988 and running consistently since 1993, while the Tour de France Femmes was only launched in 2022 (succeeding the Grande Boucle Féminine Internationale, a female equivalent of the Tour from 1984–2009), and La Vuelta Femenina started in its current form in 2023. The Vuelta replaced the shorter and less demanding Challenge by La Vuelta stage race, whose status as a Grand Tour was contested.

Despite the evolving status of women's races, Annemiek van Vleuten is often credited with winning a "grand tour triple" or "all three Grand Tours" for her achievements in 2022. Van Vleuten won the Tour, the Giro, and the Challenge by La Vuelta, in addition to winning the 2022 World Championship. This came as part of a run of six consecutive victories in major stage races: Challenge by La Vuelta (2021 and 2022), Giro Donne (2022 and 2023), Tour de France Femmes (2022), and La Vuelta Femenina (2023). In 2026, Demi Vollering became the second woman to win all three major women's stage races, winning the Tour de France Femmes in 2023, winning La Vuelta Femenina twice in 2024 and 2025, and winning the Giro d'Italia Women in 2026.

==== Career winners of all three Grand Tours ====
Eight riders have won all three Grand Tours over their career.

Key
| Bold | **Bold** indicates the win that completed the career set of all three Grand Tours. |

Men's career winners of all three Grand Tours
| Cyclist | Tour de France wins | Giro d'Italia wins | Vuelta a España wins |
|---|---|---|---|
| Jacques Anquetil (FRA) | 1957, 1961, 1962, 1963, 1964 | 1960, 1964 | **1963** |
| Felice Gimondi (ITA) | 1965 | 1967, 1969, 1976 | **1968** |
| Eddy Merckx (BEL) | 1969, 1970, 1971, 1972, 1974 | 1968, 1970, 1972, 1973, 1974 | **1973** |
| Bernard Hinault (FRA) | 1978, 1979, 1981, 1982, 1985 | **1980**, 1982, 1985 | 1978, 1983 |
| Alberto Contador (ESP) | 2007, 2009 | 2008, 2015 | **2008**, 2012, 2014 |
| Vincenzo Nibali (ITA) | **2014** | 2013, 2016 | 2010 |
| Chris Froome (GBR) | 2013, 2015, 2016, 2017 | **2018** | 2011, 2017 |
| Jonas Vingegaard (DEN) | 2022, 2023 | **2026** | 2025 |

Women's career winners of all three Grand Tours
| Cyclist | La Vuelta Femenina wins | Giro d'Italia Women wins | Tour de France Femmes wins |
|---|---|---|---|
| Annemiek van Vleuten (NED) | **2023** | 2018, 2019, 2022, 2023 | 2022 |
| Demi Vollering (NED) | 2024, 2025 | **2026** | 2023, 2026 |

==== "All the jerseys" ====
While no male rider has ever won all three Grand Tours in a single calendar year/season, three riders have won the three Grand Tours consecutively across two seasons, thus holding ''all the jerseys'' at one time:

- Eddy Merckx won four consecutive Grand Tours in 1972–1973: 1972 Giro d'Italia, 1972 Tour de France, 1973 Vuelta a España, and 1973 Giro d'Italia;
- Bernard Hinault won three consecutive Grand Tours in 1982–1983: 1982 Giro d'Italia, 1982 Tour de France, and 1983 Vuelta a España;
- Chris Froome won three consecutive Grand Tours in 2017–2018: 2017 Tour de France, 2017 Vuelta a España and 2018 Giro d'Italia.

=== Winning world titles in three disciplines ===
While the triple crown is typically mentioned in the context of road racing, some commentators have used the phrase to refer to winning across three different cycling disciplines: a "rainbow triple crown" (named for the rainbow jersey worn by the reigning world champion). In 2014, Pauline Ferrand-Prévot won the World Championship road race and followed this in 2015 with the world championships in cyclocross and cross-country mountain biking, which meant she held world titles in three cycling disciplines simultaneously. In 2022, she won the UCI Gravel World Championships, adding to a total of eight world championships across four disciplines.

Dutch riders Marianne Vos and Mathieu van der Poel have also won world championships in at least three disciplines across their career: Vos won the road race three times, cyclo-cross eight times, track twice (in two different events), and gravel once; van der Poel won the road race once, cyclo-cross eight times, and gravel once.
