= 1992 Paris–Nice =

Race details
- Dates: 8–15 March 1992
- Stages: 7 + Prologue
- Distance: 1,048.2 km (651.3 mi)
- Winning time: 25h 27' 57"

Results
Jersey awarded to the overall winner	Winner	Jean-François Bernard (FRA)	(Banesto)
	Second	Tony Rominger (SUI)	(CLAS–Cajastur)
	Third	Miguel Induráin (ESP)	(Banesto)

The 1992 Paris–Nice was the 50th edition of the Paris–Nice cycle race and was held from 8 March to 15 March 1992. The race started in Fontenay-sous-Bois and finished at the Col d'Èze. The race was won by Jean-François Bernard of the Banesto team.

== Route ==
Stage characteristics and winners
Stage	Date	Course	Distance	Type	Winner
1	8 March	Fontenay-sous-Bois	5.7 km (3.5 mi)	Individual time trial	Tony Rominger (SUI)
2	9 March	Gien to Nevers	180 km (110 mi)		Mario Cipollini (ITA)
3	10 March	Nevers to Roanne	176 km (109 mi)		Mario Cipollini (ITA)
4	11 March	Saint-Étienne	26.5 km (16.5 mi)	Team time trial	Ariostea
5	12 March	Miramas to Marseille	176 km (109 mi)		Mario Cipollini (ITA)
6	13 March	Toulon to Mandelieu-la-Napoule	187 km (116 mi)		Tony Rominger (SUI)
7	14 March	Mandelieu-la-Napoule	180 km (110 mi)		Stéphane Heulot (FRA)
8	15 March	Mandelieu-la-Napoule to Nice	105 km (65 mi)		Adriano Baffi (ITA)
9	15 March	Nice to Col d'Èze	12 km (7.5 mi)	Individual time trial	Jean-François Bernard (FRA)

== General classification ==
Final general classification

Rank	Rider	Team	Time
1	Jean-François Bernard (FRA)	Banesto	25h 27' 57"
2	Tony Rominger (SUI)	CLAS–Cajastur	+ 34"
3	Miguel Induráin (ESP)	Banesto	+ 1' 17"
4	Jesús Montoya (ESP)	Amaya Seguros	+ 1' 46"
5	Christophe Manin (FRA)	RMO	+ 2' 14"
6	Rolf Gölz (GER)	Ariostea	+ 2' 38"
7	Jérôme Simon (FRA)	Z	+ 3' 14"
8	Julián Gorospe (ESP)	Banesto	+ 3' 17"
9	Óscar Vargas (COL)	Amaya Seguros	+ 3' 24"
10	Charly Mottet (FRA)	RMO	+ 3' 29"
