= Gilles Sanders =

French cyclist

Personal information
- Born: 9 August 1964 (age 62) Narbonne, France

Cycling career
- Sport: Cycling
- Role: Rider

Gilles Sanders (born 9 August 1964) is a former French racing cyclist. He rode in three editions of the Tour de France between 1987 and 1989.
