= Jeff Pierce (cyclist) =

American cyclist (born 1958)

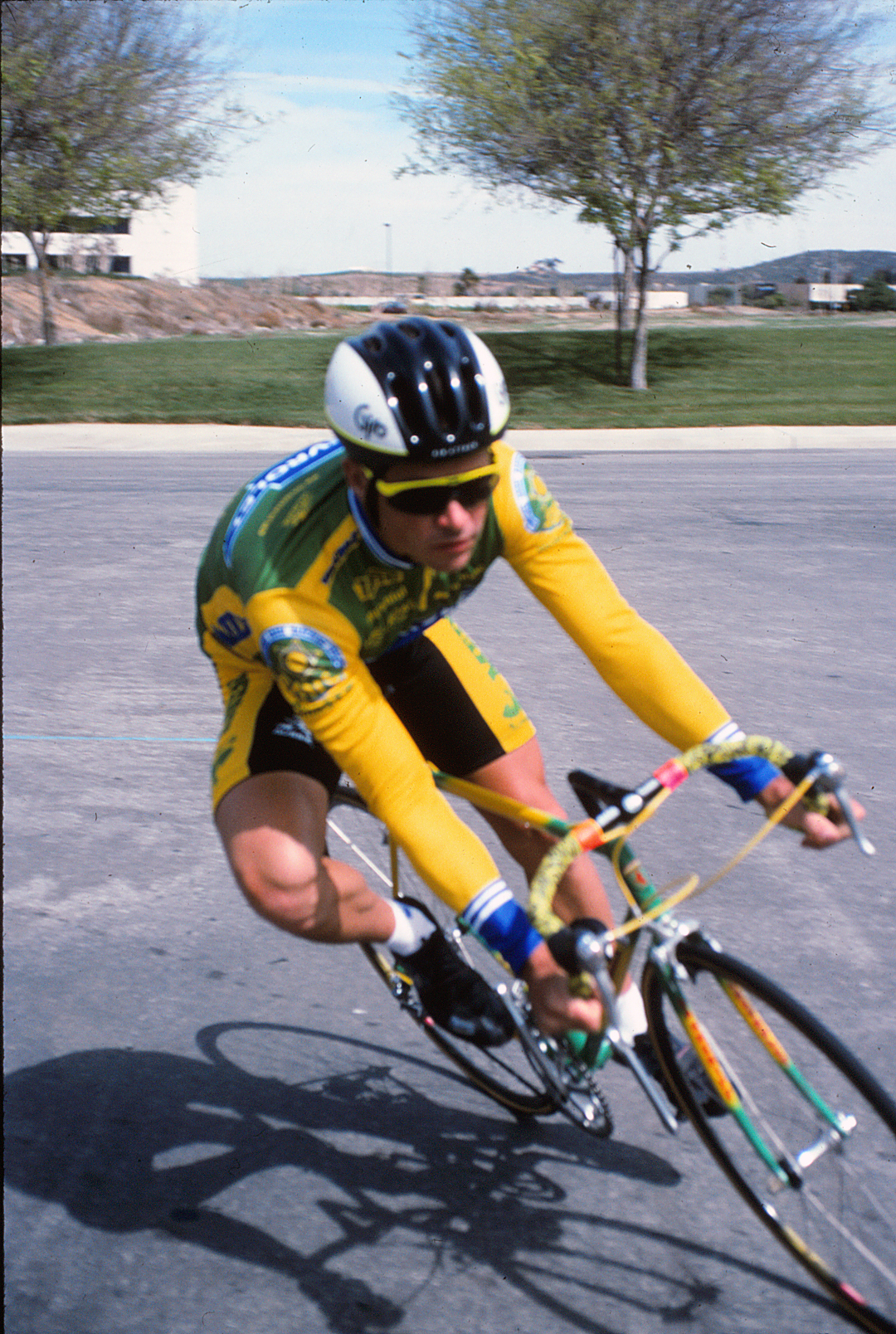
- Jeff Pierce Demonstrates Turning and Cornering in "John Howard's Lessons in Cycling" Videotape, 1991 - Photo by Patty Mooney

Personal information
- Full name: Jeff Pierce
- Born: August 28, 1958 (age 68) United States

Cycling career
- Sport: Cycling
- Current team: Retired
- Discipline: Road
- Role: Rider

Professional teams
- 1986: Schwinn
- 1987–1990: 7-Eleven
- 1991–1996: Chevrolet-LA Sheriff

Major wins
- 1 stage Tour de France (1987)

Jeff Pierce (born August 28, 1958) is a retired American professional road bicycle racer. At the 1987 Tour de France, Pierce gained fame by becoming the third American (after Davis Phinney and Greg LeMond) to win a stage in the Tour de France, winning the final stage on the Champs-Élysées from the breakaway while riding for Team 7-Eleven.

In 1991, Jeff Pierce appeared in a video with Olympic cyclist John Howard, entitled John Howard's Lessons in Cycling.

After his retirement from competitive cycling, Pierce served as USA Cycling's Vice President of Athletics.

He was inducted into the United States Bicycling Hall of Fame in 2020.

== Major results ==
1980
1st Overall Tour of Kansas City
1985
1st Overall Tour de Berlin
1st Nevada City Classic
1st Stage 10 Coors Classic
1986
1st Overall Vuelta a Bisbee

1st Stages 2, 3, & 5

3rd Overall Redlands Bicycle Classic
6th Overall Coors Classic
1987
1st Stage 25 Tour de France
1st Overall Tour of Texas

1st Prologue

1st Athens Twilight Criterium
2nd Overall Coors Classic
1988
1st Stages 1 & 6 Coors Classic
1989
1st Stage 4 Tour of the Basque Country
1994
2nd Overall Redlands Bicycle Classic

1st Stage 2
