= Giovanni Bottoia =

Italian cyclist

Personal information
- Born: 9 May 1962 (age 64) Varese, Italy

Cycling career
- Sport: Cycling
- Role: Rider

Giovanni Bottoia (born 9 May 1962) is an Italian former professional racing cyclist. He rode in one edition of the Tour de France, three editions of the Giro d'Italia and one edition of the Vuelta a España.

== Major results ==
1982
1st Stage 9 Course de la Paix
1986
1st GP Industria & Artigianato
