= Peter Stevenhaagen =

Dutch cyclist

Personal information
- Full name: Peter Stevenhaagen
- Born: April 24, 1965 (age 61) Haarlem, The Netherlands

Cycling career
- Sport: Cycling
- Current team: Retired
- Discipline: Road
- Role: Rider

Amateur team
- 1984–1985: Amstel

Professional teams
- 1986–1988: PDM
- 1988–1992: Helvetia–La Suisse

Peter Stevenhaagen (born April 24, 1965, in Haarlem, North Holland) is a retired road bicycle racer from the Netherlands, who was a professional rider from 1986 to 1992. He rode a total number of five Tours de France during his career.

== Tour de France ==
- 1986 – 29th
- 1987 – 45th
- 1988 – 29th
- 1989 – 50th
- 1991 – 94th

During stage 1 of the 1988 edition he wore the green jersey, as after the prologue he was ranked 2nd.
