= Rudy Patry =

Belgian cyclist

Personal information
- Born: 6 August 1961 (age 65) Vilvoorde, Belgium

Cycling career
- Sport: Cycling
- Role: Rider

Rudy Patry (born 6 August 1961) is a former Belgian racing cyclist. He rode in Giro d'Italia and the Tour de France.
