= Frédéric Brun (cyclist, born 1957) =

French cyclist (1957–2025)

Personal information
- Born: 15 September 1957 Ribérac, France
- Died: 22 December 2025 (aged 68)

Cycling career
- Sport: Cycling
- Role: Rider

Frédéric Brun (15 September 1957 – 22 December 2025) was a French racing cyclist. He rode in twelve Grand Tours between 1980 and 1991. He rode the 1990 Giro d'Italia, the Vuelta a Espana in 1985 and 1991 and for the Tour de France he rode in 1980, each year between 1982 and 1988 as well as 1990. He had three top 10 stage finishes, two in 1984 and one in 1987. He finished every Grand Tour that he started.

Brun died on 22 December 2025, at the age of 68.
