= Jean-François Bernard =

French cyclist

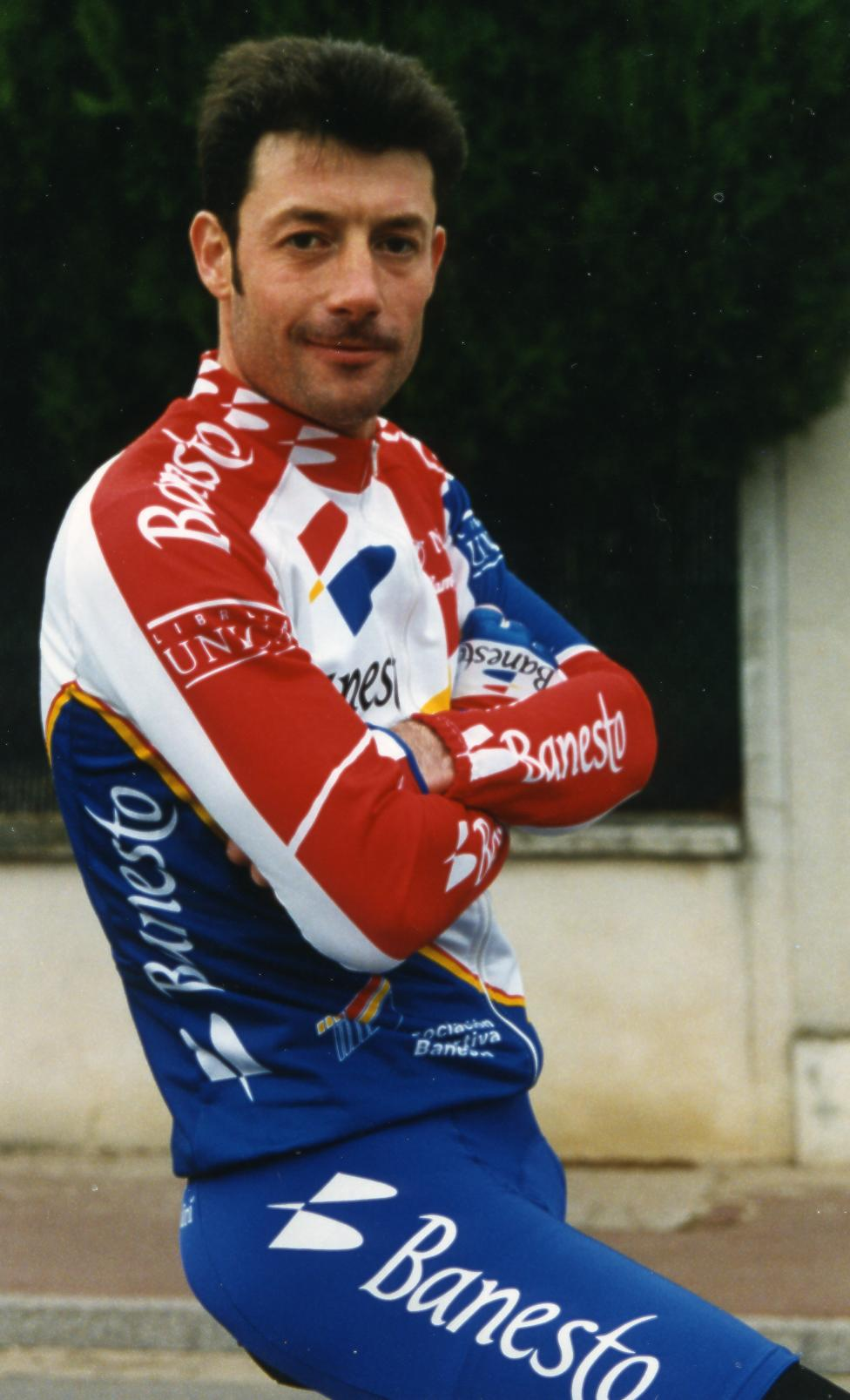

Personal information
- Full name: Jean-François Bernard
- Born: 2 May 1962 (age 64) Luzy, France

Cycling career
- Sport: Cycling
- Current team: Retired
- Discipline: Road
- Role: Rider
- Rider type: All Rounder

Amateur team
- 1984: JGA Nervers

Professional teams
- 1984–1990: La Vie Claire La Vie Claire
- 1991–1994: Banesto
- 1995: Chazal–König
- 1996: Agrigel–La Creuse

Major wins
- Grand Tour Tour de France Combination classification (1987) 3 individual stages (1986, 1987) Giro d'Italia 4 individual stages (1987, 1988) Vuelta a España 1 individual stage (1990) Stage Races Paris–Nice (1992)

Jean-François Bernard (born 2 May 1962) is a French former professional road bicycle racer.

== Career ==
He turned professional in 1984 for La Vie Claire, led by Bernard Hinault. He was seen as Hinault’s successor as a winner of stage races from 1986.

He competed in the team time trial event at the 1984 Summer Olympics.

Bernard wore the yellow jersey as leader of the general classification in the 1987 Tour de France and won two stages, both time trials, including one on Mont Ventoux. He finished the race third behind Stephen Roche of Ireland and Pedro Delgado of Spain and was in contention all the way to the end in what still remains among the closest Tours in history.

He won three stages in the 1988 Giro d'Italia and led the race, but he crashed in a tunnel, injured his back and abandoned the race. The next year he needed an operation and months of recuperation for fibrosis in his left knee.

A saddle sore and another operation forced him out of the 1990 Tour de France. He never again challenged in the grands tours. In 1991 he joined the Spanish team, Banesto which had two leaders for stage races in Delgado and Miguel Indurain. Bernard helped Indurain dominate the Tour.

Bernard won the 1992 Paris–Nice.

Bernard retired at the end of 1996 with 52 professional wins. He is now a consultant for L'Équipe, L'Équipe TV and Eurosport. In 2005 a race, La Jean-François Bernard, was organised in the Nièvre region of Bourgogne as part of the Trophy of Bourgogne, an amateur competition. He is the father of racing cyclist Julien Bernard.

== Career achievements ==
=== Major results ===
1983
1st Road race, National Amateur Road Championships
1984
5th Overall Tour de l'Avenir
1985
1st Stage 6a Tour de Suisse
3rd Trofeo Baracchi
5th Grand Prix des Nations
9th Overall Critérium International
10th Overall Tour du Limousin

1st Stage 2

10th Overall Tour de l'Avenir
10th Clásica de San Sebastián
1986
1st Overall Tour Méditerranéen

1st Stage 5a (ITT)

1st Coppa Sabatini
1st Châteauroux Classic de l'Indre Trophée Fenioux
1st Stage 16 Tour de France
1st Prologue Tour d'Armorique
2nd Overall Tour de Romandie

1st Prologue & Stage 5b (ITT)

3rd Grand Prix des Nations
3rd Gran Piemonte
5th Overall Critérium International
6th Grand Prix de Cannes
7th Overall Critérium du Dauphiné Libéré

1st Prologue & Stage 7b (ITT)

7th Overall Paris–Nice
9th Tour du Nord-Ouest
1987
1st Giro dell'Emilia
1st Grand Prix de Rennes
1st Stage 19 Giro d'Italia
2nd Overall Paris–Nice

1st Stage 4

2nd Circuit de l'Aulne
2nd Grand Prix des Nations
3rd Overall Tour de France

1st Combination classification
1st Stages 18 (ITT) & 24 (ITT)

7th Overall Critérium International
10th Critérium des As
1988
1st Grand Prix d'Aix-en-Provence
Giro d'Italia

1st Stages 1 (ITT), 8 & 15

5th Overall Tour de Romandie
9th Overall Circuit de la Sarthe
1989
1st Stage 2 Tour du Vaucluse
1990
1st Stage 15 (ITT) Vuelta a España
1st Stage 7b (ITT) Paris–Nice
7th Overall Herald Sun Tour

1st Stage 7

7th Grand Prix de Wallonie
1991
1st Circuit de l'Aulne
3rd Polynormande
4th La Flèche Wallonne
6th Overall Tour du Limousin
7th Overall Circuit de la Sarthe
8th Giro dell'Appennino
1992
1st Overall Paris–Nice

1st Stage 7b (ITT)

1st Overall Circuit de la Sarthe

1st Stage 4a (ITT)

1st Overall Critérium International
1st Polynormande
2nd Trofeo Comunidad Foral de Navarra
3rd Liège–Bastogne–Liège
5th Overall Volta a Catalunya

1st Stage 3

7th Overall Tour du Limousin
10th Road race, UCI Road World Championships
1993
1st Overall Circuit de la Sarthe

1st Stage 4a (ITT)

2nd GP Ouest–France
8th Overall Tour du Limousin

1st Stage 2

8th Subida a Urkiola
1994
8th Overall Paris–Nice

=== Grand Tour general classification results timeline ===
Grand Tour	1986	1987	1988	1989	1990	1991	1992	1993	1994	1995
Vuelta a España	—	—	—	—	59	—	—	DNF	—	DNF
Giro d'Italia	—	16	DNF	—	—	14	—	—	—	—
Tour de France	12	3	DNF	—	DNF	14	39	49	17	34

Legend
—	Did not compete
DNF	Did not finish
