= Martial Gayant =

French cyclist

Personal information
- Full name: Martial Gayant
- Born: 16 November 1962 (age 63) Chauny, France

Cycling career
- Sport: Cycling
- Current team: Groupama–FDJ United
- Disciplines: Road and cyclo-cross
- Role: Directeur sportif

Professional teams
- 1982–1985: Renault-Elf
- 1986–1987: Système U
- 1988–1991: Toshiba
- 1992: Lotto

Managerial teams
- 1999–2000: Saint-Quentin-Oktos
- 2001–: Française des Jeux

Major wins
- 1987 Tour de France: 1 stage and 2 yellow jerseys French national champion field riding
Medal record
Representing France
Men's road bicycle racing
World Championships
Silver medal – second place	1988 Ronse	Elite Men's Road Race

Martial Gayant (born 16 November 1962 in Chauny) is a former French cyclist, now a team captain of Groupama–FDJ United. In 1988, Gayant came second in the World road Championships.

== Major results ==
1981

- GP des Nations, amateurs

1984

- Giro d'Italia: stage 10

1985

- Paris–Camembert

1986

- GP Ouest France-Plouay
- French national champion field riding

1987

- Four Days of Dunkirk: Stage 4
- Tour de France: Stage 11

1989

- Grand Prix de Fourmies

1990

- Tour de l'Avenir: Stage 8
- Tour de Limousin

== Tours de France ==
- 1985 – outside time limit on stage 15
- 1987 – 34th; winner of 11th stage, wearing the yellow jersey for 2 days
- 1988 – 71st
- 1989 – 32nd
- 1991 – withdrew on stage 6
