= Juan Jusdado =

Spanish cyclist

Personal information
- Born: 7 December 1966 (age 59) Madrid, Spain

Cycling career
- Sport: Cycling
- Role: Rider

Juan Jusdado (born 7 December 1966) is a former Spanish racing cyclist. He rode in the 1989 Tour de France.
