= Chip Rives =

American businessman (born 1964)

Personal information
- Born: December 24, 1964 (age 61) Springfield, Virginia
- Education: Wake Forest
- Occupation: Businessman
- Height: 6 ft 2 in (188 cm)
- Weight: 214 lb (97 kg; 15 st 4 lb)

Sport
- Sport: Football (college)
- Position: RB
- University team: Wake Forest Demon Deacons football

Chip Rives (born December 24, 1964) is an American businessman who is the current chief executive officer of Riddle & Bloom. Before becoming CEO, Rives worked in multiple sports marketing companies including International Management Group and Arnold Worldwide. In 1987, he was co-named Sports Illustrated Sportsperson of the Year for his Winston-Salem, North Carolina, toy drive for children. Apart from sports, Rives was the owner of the Boston Music Awards from 2003 to 2015.

== Early life and education ==
Rives was born on December 24, 1964, in Springfield, Virginia. He was raised as a military brat and received a scholarship from Wake Forest University in gridiron football. While at Wake Forest, Rives played for the Wake Forest Demon Deacons football team from 1984 to 1987 as a running back. He attended the Wake Forest University School of Business for a Master of Business Administration degree.

== Career ==
Throughout his college football career with the Deacons, Rives had a career total of 1554 yards from scrimmage, with 1080 rushing yards and 474 receiving yards. He scored his first touchdown in 1985 and had 925 scrimmage yards in 1986. During his final two seasons, Rives was the Deacons scoring leader of the 1986 season with 12 touchdowns and the 1987 Deacons leader of kick returns with 296 yards.

After completing his post-secondary studies, Rives began his career with International Management Group in the 1990s. As an executive, Rives worked for multiple companies in sports marketing including Arnold Worldwide. In 1999, he moved to president when he joined Lapham/Miller. Rives founded TRP Marketing in the 2000s and is currently the chief executive officer of Riddle & Bloom. Outside of marketing, Rives became the owner of the Boston Music Awards in 2003. He retained ownership of the awards until 2015.

== Awards ==
Rives was one of the eight people named Sports Illustrated Sportsperson of the Year in 1987 for their charity work. He was awarded by Sports Illustrated for providing toys to disadvantaged children living in Winston-Salem, North Carolina.
