= Fabrice Philipot =

French cyclist (1965–2020)

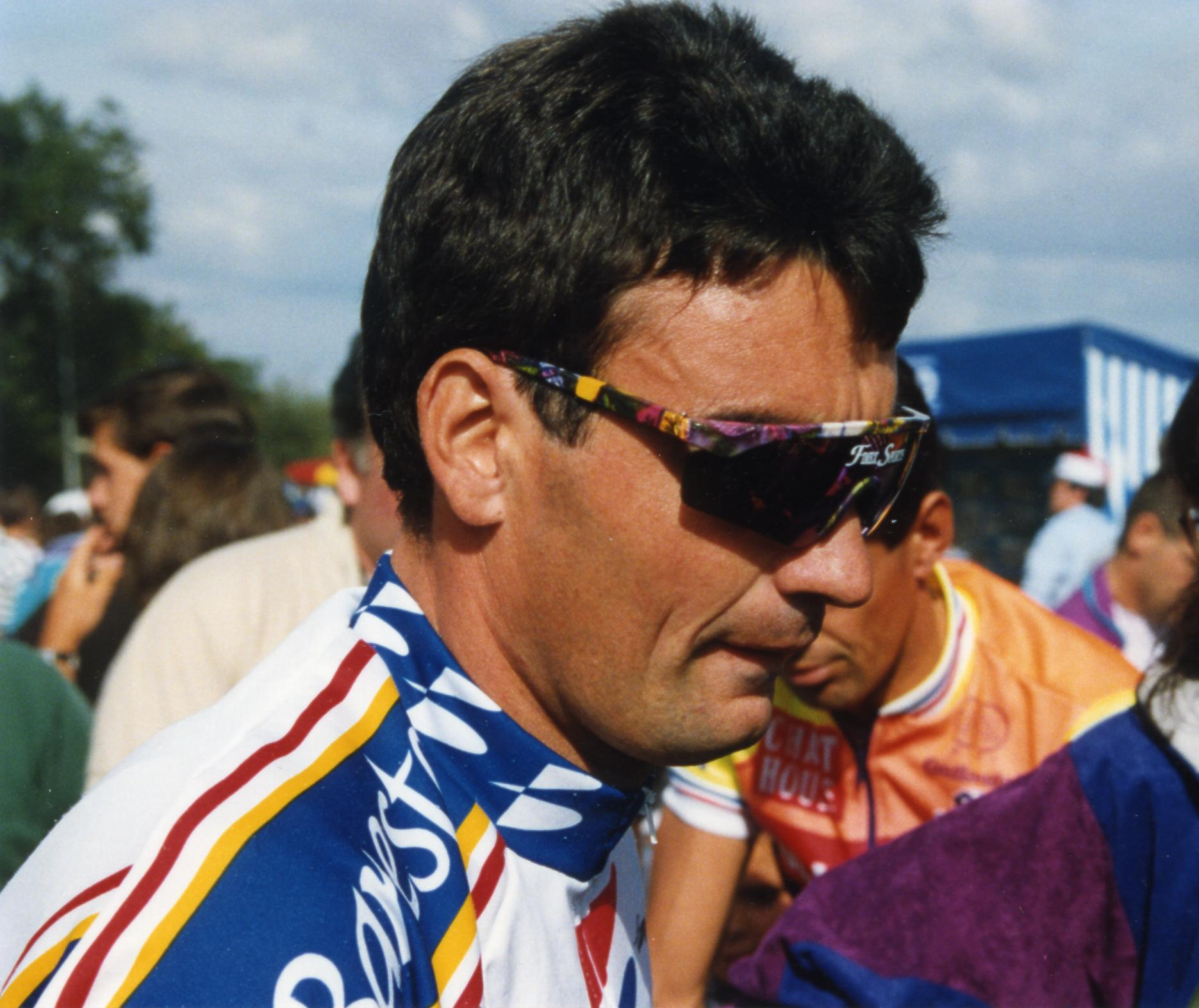

Personal information
- Born: 24 September 1965 Montbard, France
- Died: 17 June 2020 (aged 54) Semur-en-Auxois, France

Cycling career
- Sport: Cycling
- Discipline: Road
- Role: Rider

Professional teams
- 1988–1989: Toshiba
- 1990: Castorama
- 1991–1993: Banesto
- 1994: Chazal-MBK

Major wins
- Tour de France, Maillot blanc (1989)

Fabrice Philipot (24 September 1965 – 17 June 2020) was a French road bicycle racer. His greatest achievements include winning the young rider classification in the 1989 Tour de France where he placed 24th overall, and finishing second at the 1989 Liège–Bastogne–Liège. In the 1990 Tour de France he was the highest placed rider on his Castorama team finishing in 14th overall, which also made him the highest placing Frenchman that year. He rode in support of Miguel Induráin during the 1991 Tour de France on a very strong Team Banesto who had five riders placed in the top 25 including their leader in the maillot jaune. Philipot placed 24th overall. He rode in support of Indurain during his 2nd Tour victory in 1992 but did not finish. He helped Indurain to victory at the 1992 and 1993 Giro d'Italia. He then rode for Team Chazal in his homeland before retirement. He died on 17 June 2020 at the age of 54.
