= Sports Illustrated Sportsperson of the Year =

Annual honor presented by the American magazine Sports Illustrated

The Sports Illustrated issue honoring Rafer Johnson as Sportsman of the Year for 1958

Since its inception in 1954, Sports Illustrated has annually presented the Sportsman of the Year award to "the athlete or team whose performance that year most embodies the spirit of sportsmanship and achievement." Both Americans and non-Americans are eligible, though in the past the vast majority of winners have been from the United States. Both men and women have won the award, originally called "Sportsman of the Year" and renamed "Sportswoman of the Year" or "Sportswomen of the Year" when applicable. Since 2015, the official title of the award has been Sportsperson of the Year.

Tiger Woods, Tom Brady and LeBron James are the only individuals who have received the award more than once. Woods received his first award in 1996 as an amateur golfer, and in 2000 as a professional golfer. Brady received his first award in 2005, and his second in 2021. James received his first award in 2012, his second in 2016, and a third in 2020. Curt Schilling and Stephen Curry have won the award both individually and as part of a team.

The trophy is a ceramic replica of an ancient Greek amphora (c. 510 BC) which depicts nude male Hellenistic athletes engaged in a variety of athletic activities—running, discus, and javelin. It measures 8" in diameter and stands 18.5" high (20.32 x 47 cm). The original amphora was acquired by Sports Illustrated magazine in 1954 and was donated to the "Sports" collection of the Smithsonian's National Museum of American History in 1979. Winners of the award are now presented with a copy of the amphora made in silver by Tiffany & Co.

== Winners ==
The award's trophy, a ceramic urn depicting great athletes, has been given to the following recipients:

- Note: non-athlete individuals in Italics

| Year | Winner | Nationality | Sport | Achievement |
|---|---|---|---|---|
| 1954 | Roger Bannister | Great Britain | Track and field | First sub-four-minute mile |
| 1955 | Johnny Podres | United States | Baseball | World Series MVP |
| 1956 | Bobby Morrow | United States | Track and field | Triple Olympic gold medalist |
| 1957 | Stan Musial | United States | Baseball | National League batting champion |
| 1958 | Rafer Johnson | United States | Track and field | Decathlon world record |
| 1959 | Ingemar Johansson | Sweden | Boxing | World Heavyweight Champion |
| 1960 | Arnold Palmer | United States | Golf | PGA Player of the Year |
| 1961 | Jerry Lucas | United States | College basketball | Final Four MVP |
| 1962 | Terry Baker | United States | College football | Heisman Trophy winner |
| 1963 | Pete Rozelle | United States | Professional football | NFL Commissioner; credited for expansion and the suspension of athletes for gambling |
| 1964 | Ken Venturi | United States | Golf | U.S. Open champion |
| 1965 | Sandy Koufax | United States | Baseball | World Series Champion, Cy Young Award, Triple Crown winner, World Series MVP |
| 1966 | Jim Ryun | United States | Track and field | Mile world record |
| 1967 | Carl Yastrzemski | United States | Baseball | Triple Crown winner, AL MVP |
| 1968 | Bill Russell | United States | Professional basketball | NBA champion player-coach |
| 1969 | Tom Seaver | United States | Baseball | Cy Young Award, World Series champion |
| 1970 | Bobby Orr | Canada | Ice hockey | NHL MVP, Art Ross, Conn Smythe, Norris |
| 1971 | Lee Trevino | United States | Golf | PGA Player of the Year |
| 1972 | Billie Jean King | United States | Tennis | Three major titles |
| 1972 | John Wooden | United States | College basketball | NCAA champion coach |
| 1973 | Jackie Stewart | Great Britain | Auto racing | Formula One World Champion |
| 1974 | Muhammad Ali | United States | Boxing | World heavyweight champion |
| 1975 | Pete Rose | United States | Baseball | World Series MVP |
| 1976 | Chris Evert | United States | Tennis | Two major titles |
| 1977 | Steve Cauthen | United States | Horse racing | Eclipse Award for Outstanding Jockey |
| 1978 | Jack Nicklaus | United States | Golf | British Open champion |
| 1979 | Terry Bradshaw | United States | Professional football | Super Bowl MVP |
| 1979 | Willie Stargell | United States | Baseball | NL MVP, NLCS MVP, World Series MVP |
| 1980 | U.S. Olympic hockey team | United States | Ice Hockey | Olympic gold medalists |
| 1981 | Sugar Ray Leonard | United States | Boxing | World welterweight champion |
| 1982 | Wayne Gretzky | Canada | Ice Hockey | NHL MVP, Art Ross |
| 1983 | Mary Decker | United States | Track and field | Double world champion |
| 1984 | Edwin Moses | United States | Track and field | Olympic gold medalist |
| 1984 | Mary Lou Retton | United States | Gymnastics | Olympic gold medalist |
| 1985 | Kareem Abdul-Jabbar | United States | Professional basketball | Playoff MVP |
| 1986 | Joe Paterno | United States | College football | NCAA champion coach |
| 1987 | Bob Bourne | Canada | Ice Hockey | Helped handicapped children's school |
| 1987 | Judi Brown King | United States | Track and field | Helped abused children |
| 1987 | Kipchoge Keino | Kenya | Track and field | Cared for orphaned children |
| 1987 | Dale Murphy | United States | Baseball | Charity spokesman |
| 1987 | Chip Rives | United States | College football | Helped needy children |
| 1987 | Patty Sheehan | United States | Golf | Helped abused girls |
| 1987 | Rory Sparrow | United States | Professional basketball | Helped school children |
| 1987 | Reggie Williams | United States | Professional football | Helped high school students |
| 1988 | Orel Hershiser | United States | Baseball | World Series Champion, Cy Young Award, NLCS MVP, World Series MVP |
| 1989 | Greg LeMond | United States | Road cycling | Tour de France and World champion |
| 1990 | Joe Montana | United States | Professional football | Three-time Super Bowl MVP |
| 1991 | Michael Jordan | United States | Professional basketball | NBA MVP, NBA Finals MVP, NBA Champion |
| 1992 | Arthur Ashe | United States | Tennis | Supported humanitarian causes |
| 1993 | Don Shula | United States | Professional football | Winningest NFL coach |
| 1994 | Bonnie Blair | United States | Speed skating | Double Olympic gold medalist |
| 1994 | Johann Olav Koss | Norway | Speed skating | Triple Olympic gold medalist |
| 1995 | Cal Ripken Jr. | United States | Baseball | Consecutive games record |
| 1996 | Tiger Woods | United States | Golf | U.S. Amateur, NCAA champion |
| 1997 | Dean Smith | United States | College basketball | Winningest college coach at the time of publication |
| 1998 | Mark McGwire | United States | Baseball | Single-season home run record holder at the time of publication |
| 1998 | Sammy Sosa | Dominican Republic | Baseball | National League MVP |
| 1999 | U.S. women's soccer team | United States | Soccer | World Cup champions |
| 2000 | Tiger Woods (2) | United States | Golf | Three major championships |
| 2001 | Curt Schilling | United States | Baseball | World Series Co-MVP |
| 2001 | Randy Johnson | United States | Baseball | World Series Co-MVP, Cy Young Award |
| 2002 | Lance Armstrong | United States | Cycling | Four-time Tour de France winner (wins later disqualified in 2012) |
| 2003 | David Robinson | United States | Professional basketball | Two-time NBA champion |
| 2003 | Tim Duncan | United States | Professional basketball | NBA MVP, NBA Champion, NBA Finals MVP |
| 2004 | Boston Red Sox | United States | Baseball | 2004 World Series champions |
| 2005 | Tom Brady | United States | Professional football | Two-time Super Bowl MVP, Three-time Super Bowl champion |
| 2006 | Dwyane Wade | United States | Professional basketball | NBA Champion, NBA Finals MVP |
| 2007 | Brett Favre | United States | Professional football | "For his perseverance and his passion" |
| 2008 | Michael Phelps | United States | Swimming | Eight gold medals in 2008 Summer Olympics |
| 2009 | Derek Jeter | United States | Baseball | World Series Champion |
| 2010 | Drew Brees | United States | Professional football | Super Bowl MVP and charitable work toward the reconstruction of New Orleans |
| 2011 | Mike Krzyzewski | United States | College basketball | Most wins as coach in NCAA men's Division I history |
| 2011 | Pat Summitt | United States | College basketball | All-time winningest coach in NCAA basketball |
| 2012 | LeBron James | United States | Professional basketball | NBA MVP, NBA Finals MVP, NBA Champion, Olympic gold medalist |
| 2013 | Peyton Manning | United States | Professional football | Five-Time NFL MVP, single-season touchdown record, AFC Champion |
| 2014 | Madison Bumgarner | United States | Baseball | Three-time World Series Champion, NLCS MVP, World Series MVP |
| 2015 | Serena Williams | United States | Tennis | Won three majors, oldest player to be ranked no. 1 during the Open Era |
| 2016 | LeBron James (2) | United States | Professional basketball | NBA Finals MVP, led Cleveland Cavaliers to first title in franchise history |
| 2017 | Jose Altuve | Venezuela | Baseball | American League MVP, World Series Champion, Helped lead the Houston Astros to their first ever title and the city's first major championship since 1995. |
| 2017 | J. J. Watt | United States | Professional football | Raised more than $37 million in relief aid for the city of Houston, Texas less than a month after the impact of Hurricane Harvey. |
| 2018 | Golden State Warriors | United States | Professional basketball | 2018 NBA champions, third title in last four years. |
| 2019 | Megan Rapinoe | United States | Soccer | FIFA Women's World Cup champion, won Golden Ball and Golden Boot. |
| 2020 | Laurent Duvernay-Tardif | Canada | Professional football | Super Bowl LIV champion, sat out the 2020 season to serve as an orderly during the COVID-19 pandemic. |
| 2020 | LeBron James (3) | United States | Professional basketball | NBA Finals MVP, worked to end voter suppression. First three-time winner. |
| 2020 | Patrick Mahomes | United States | Professional football | Super Bowl MVP, pushed the NFL to recognize the Black Lives Matter movement, pushed to encourage voter registration across the country, as well as among his teammates |
| 2020 | Naomi Osaka | Japan | Tennis | U.S. Open champion and advocate for social justice. |
| 2020 | Breanna Stewart | United States | Professional basketball | WNBA Finals MVP, spoke out against racism and for women's equality. |
| 2021 | Tom Brady (2) | United States | Professional football | Super Bowl LV MVP, 7-time Super Bowl champion |
| 2022 | Stephen Curry | United States | Professional basketball | NBA Finals MVP, led the Golden State Warriors to their fourth title in eight years. |
| 2023 | Deion Sanders | United States | College football | For revitalizing the Colorado Buffaloes Football program, despite a 4–8 record. |
| 2024 | Simone Biles | United States | Artistic gymnastics | 3x 2024 Olympic gold medalist, transformed gymnastics in the US and conversations around athletes in general. |
| 2025 | Shai Gilgeous-Alexander | Canada | Basketball | Led the Oklahoma City Thunder to a franchise-record 68 wins and their first NBA championship; named NBA MVP and NBA Finals MVP. |

== See also ==
- Sporting News Sportsman of the Year (1968 to 2008)
- Sports Illustrated Top 20 Female Athletes of the Decade (2009)
- Sports Illustrated Top 20 Male Athletes of the Decade (2009)
- Athlete of the Year
- Associated Press Athlete of the Year (AP)
- ESPY Award
- United Press International Athlete of the Year Award (UPI) (defunct)
- Laureus World Sports Awards (Laureus World Sports Academy)
- BBC Overseas Sports Personality of the Year
- L'Équipe Champion of Champions
