= William Drohan =

American microbiologist and educator (1946-2007)

- Born: 1946
- Died: March 25, 2007 (aged 60); Germantown, Maryland, U.S.
- Spouse: Marian
- Children: 5

Academic background
- Education: University of California, Los Angeles (BA, PhD)

Academic work
- Discipline: Microbiology; Bacteriology
- Sub-discipline: Hematology
- Institutions: National Cancer Institute; American Red Cross; George Washington University; University of Maryland; National Research Council

William N. Drohan (1946 – March 25, 2007) was an American microbiologist and academic known for his research in the field of hematology.

== Education ==
Drohan earned a Bachelor of Arts degree in bacteriology from the University of California, Los Angeles and a PhD in medical microbiology and immunology from UCLA School of Medicine.

== Career ==
He was known for his commitment to improving blood safety, his work in transgenic proteins to treat hemophilia and other blood-related disorders, as well as contributions in investigating mad cow disease in the blood supply.

His work focused on utilizing animals such as pigs to produce fibrinogenin large quantities. This was used for research on creating an artificial bandage that he stated could save thousands of lives.

His career included positions with the National Cancer Institute, the American Red Cross, and private companies that treated blood-borne disorders, most recently as chief scientific officer at Inspiration Biopharmaceuticals, and previously president and subsequently chief scientific officer of Clearant.

He also served as a professor in the Graduate Program of the Department of Genetics at George Washington University and formerly as an adjunct professor in the Department of Chemical and Biochemical Engineering at the University of Maryland.

He served on the editorial boards of several scientific journals, and was a member of the Scientific Steering Committee for Blood Products at Walter Reed Army Institute of Research and chairman for the Panel on Biotechnology of the National Research Council.

== Death ==
Drohan died of lung cancer at his home in Germantown, Maryland after a four-year illness. Drohan had previously lived in Springfield, Virginia and Santa Monica, California.

== Legacy ==
The Coalition for Hemophilia B created the Dr William N. Drohan scholarship fund in his honor.
