= Springfield, Virginia =

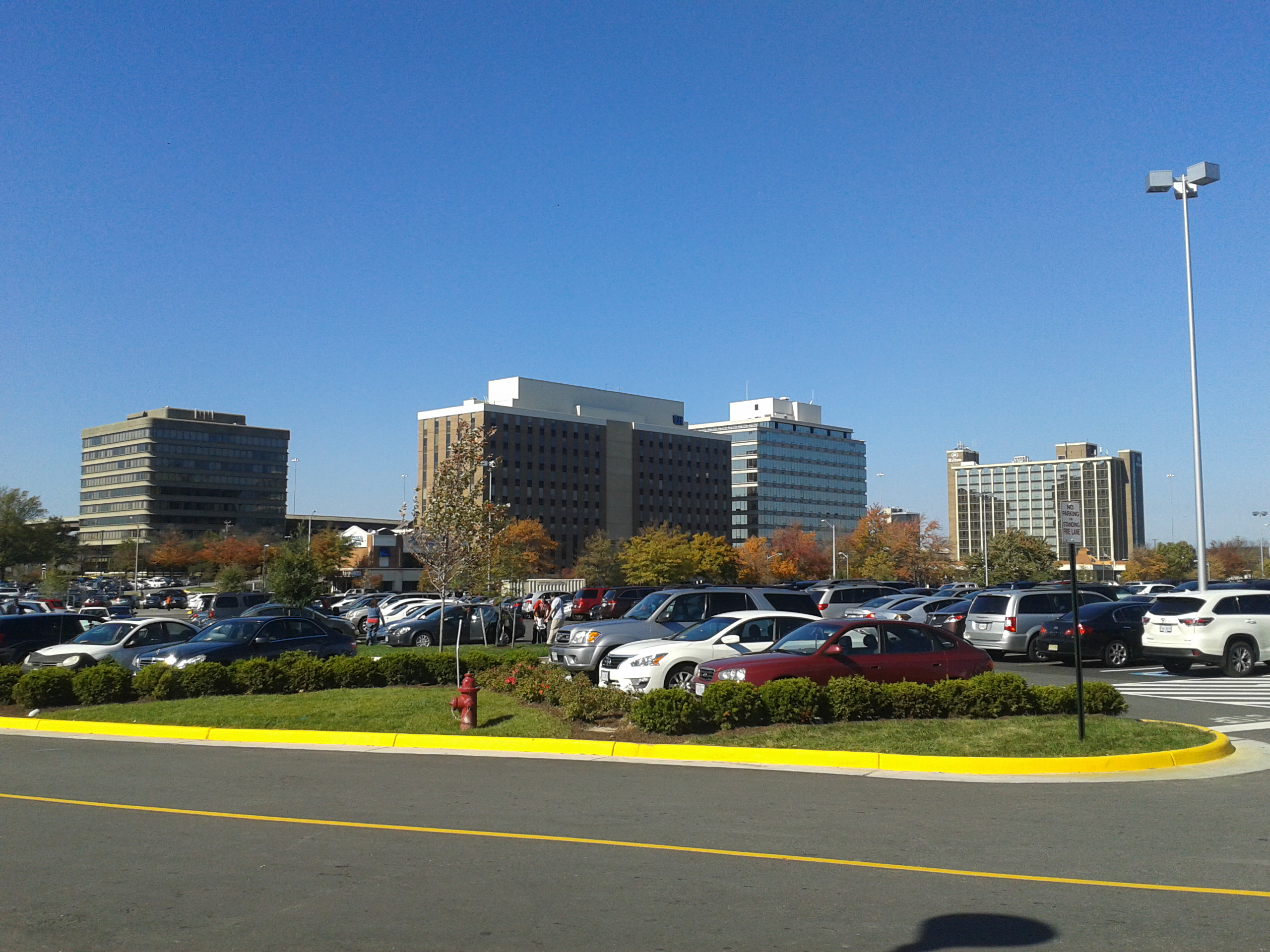
- Central Springfield Business District, seen from Springfield Town Center in October 2014

- Flag

- Location within Northern Virginia Location within Virginia Location within the United States
- Coordinates: 38°47′19″N 77°10′46″W
- Country: United States
- State: Virginia
- County: Fairfax

Area
  - Total: 28.50 sq mi (73.8 km^{2})
  - Land: 28.27 sq mi (73.2 km^{2})
  - Water: 0.24 sq mi (0.62 km^{2})
- Elevation: 246 ft (75 m)

Population (2020)
  - Total: 108,621
  - Density: 3,811/sq mi (1,471/km^{2})
- Time zone: UTC−5 (Eastern (EST))
  - Summer (DST): UTC−4 (EDT)
- Postal codes: 22150, 22151, 22152, 22153
- Area codes: 703, 571
- FIPS code: 51-74592
- GNIS feature ID: 1493642

Springfield is an unincorporated community in Fairfax County, Virginia, United States. The common definition of Springfield is the four ZIP codes that use Springfield in their mailing addresses (22150, 22151, 22152, 22153). Together, they had a population of 108,621 as of the 2020 Census. (This should not be confused with the narrowly-defined Springfield census-designated place with a population of 31,339.) Springfield is a part of Northern Virginia, the most populous region of the Washington Metropolitan Area.

== Geography ==
Springfield is located at 38°46′45″N 77°11′4″W (38.779238, −77.184636).

According to the United States Census Bureau, the CDP has a total area of 7.9 square miles (20.4 km^{2}), of which 7.9 square miles (20.3 km^{2}) is land and 0.04 square mile (0.1 km^{2}) (0.49%) is water.

The area is dominated by the interchange of I-95, I-395, and the Capital Beltway (I-495), known as the Springfield Interchange. The center of the town is at the intersection of Route 644 (Old Keene Mill Road / Franconia Road) and Route 617 (Backlick Road) adjacent to the interchange. A significant commercial district exists around the interchange area, but the rest of the community is primarily residential in character.

According to the U.S. Postal Service, Springfield collectively has four ZIP codes:

- 22150 (often unofficially referred to as Central Springfield)
- 22151 (North Springfield)
- 22152 (West Springfield)
- 22153 (West Springfield/Newington Forest)

The following are total area, water area, and land area statistics (in square miles) for the four Springfield zip codes:

Zip code	Total area	Water area	Land area
22150	7.88 sq mi.	0.01 sq mi.	7.87 sq mi.
22151	5.28 sq mi.	0.17 sq mi.	5.11 sq mi.
22152	6.16 sq mi.	0.00 sq mi.	6.16 sq mi.
22153	8.36 sq mi.	0.06 sq mi.	8.30 sq mi.
Total	28.50 sq mi.	0.24 sq mi.	28.27 sq mi.

== History ==
=== 19th century ===
A saw and grist mill was constructed in the vicinity of present-day Springfield between 1796 and 1800. Owned by James Keene, it gave its name to today's Old Keene Mill Road. The mill served farms in the area for around sixty years before its discontinuation when William H. Keene was convicted and imprisoned for the 1855 murder of Lewis Quincy Hall. Nothing remains of it today save for two mill races.

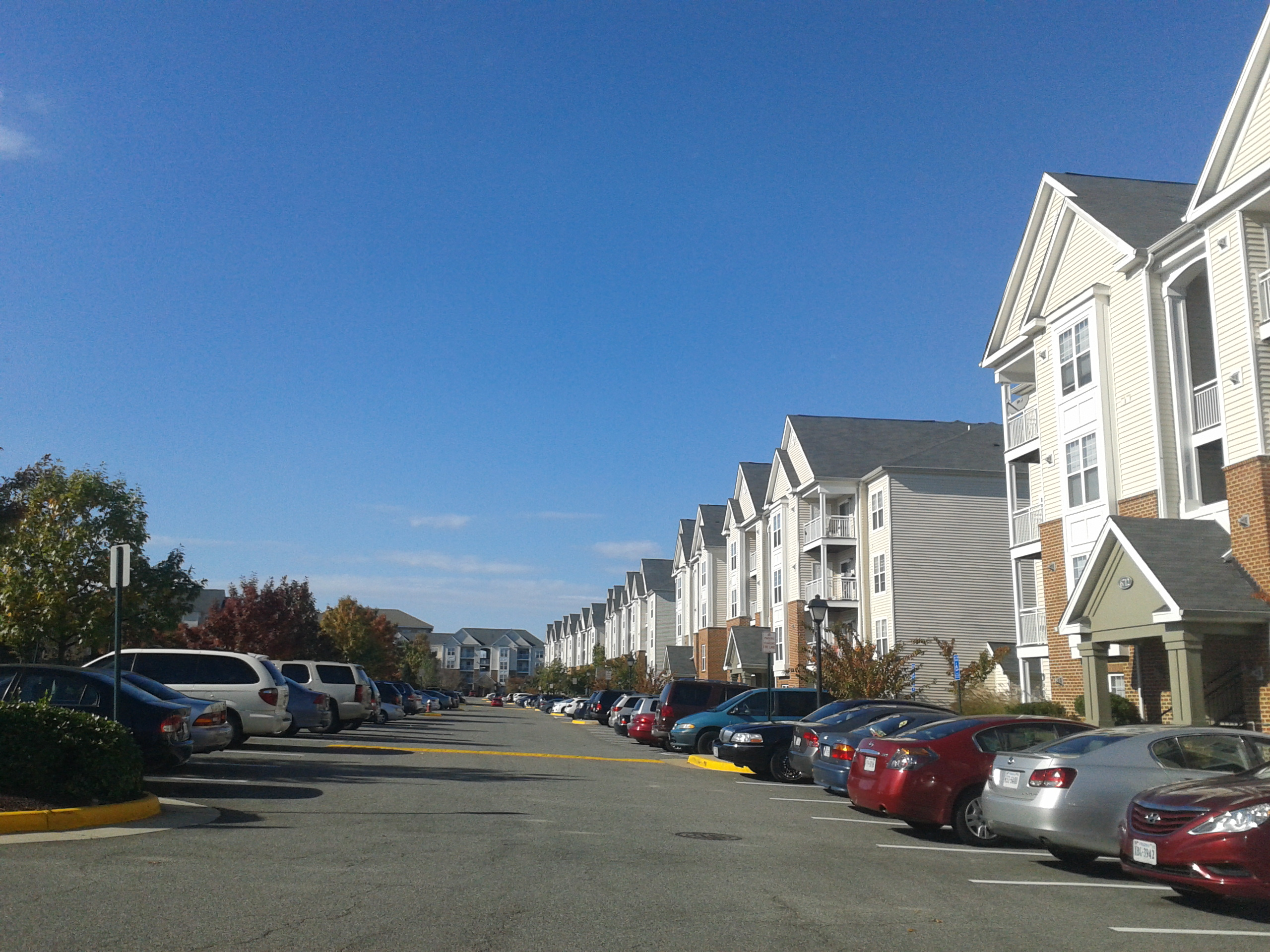
Apartment complex in Springfield

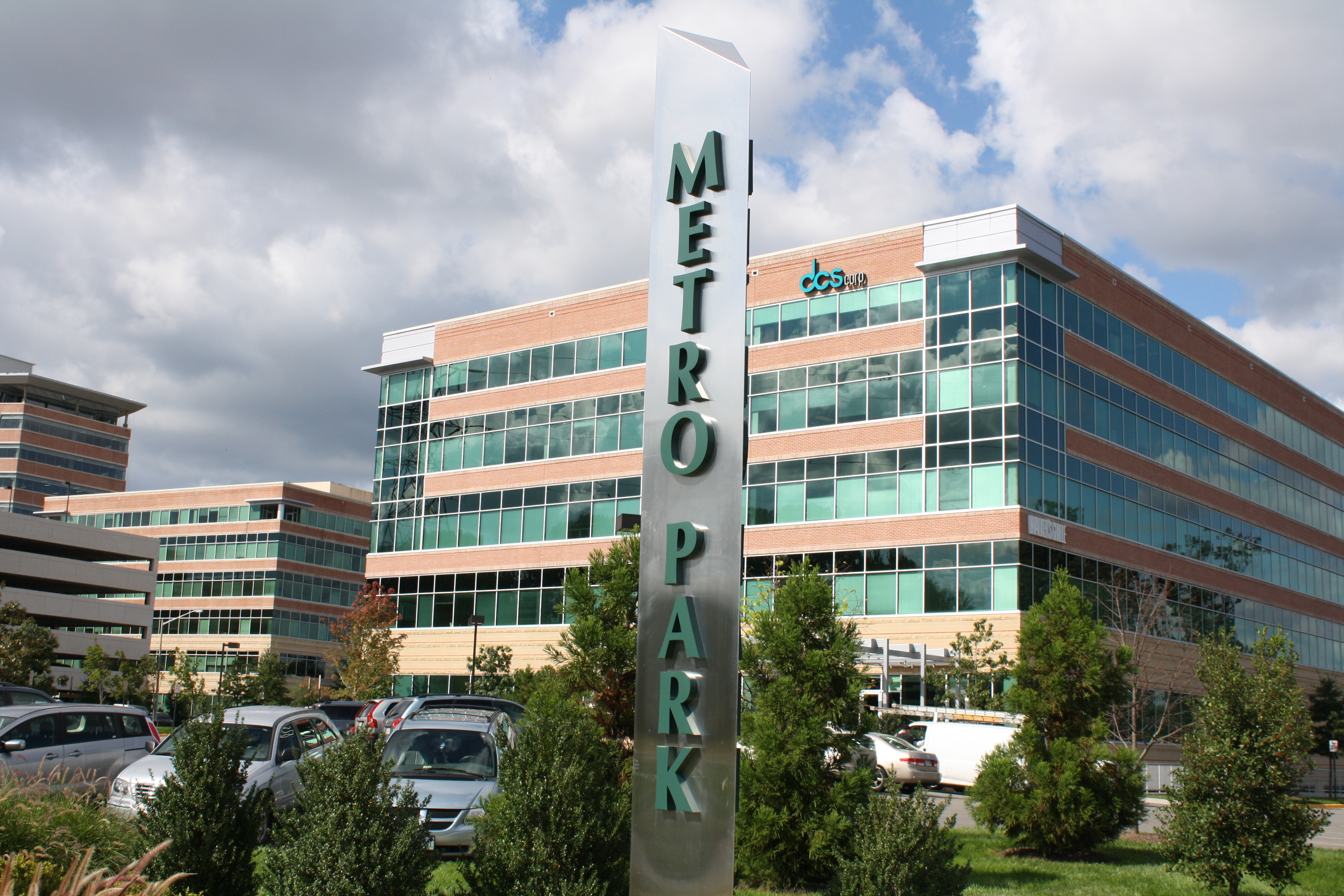
MetroPark complex of offices

Springfield was founded in 1847 around the Orange and Alexandria Railroad's Daingerfield Station; this is today the Backlick Road Virginia Railway Express station, located off Backlick Road. The area was named for "Springfield Farm", owned by Henry Daingerfield, an Alexandria businessman who sat on the railroad's board of directors. The Springfield post office was completed sometime after 1851. It was in existence at the time of the American Civil War, being the site of a skirmish on October 3, 1861, and a Confederate raid on August 3, 1863. The station served as the first Springfield Post Office from 1866 to 1868.

In 1877, Richard Moore petitioned for a post office, which he named Moor; it was located about a little over a mile south of the station, near the intersection of Fairfax (now Old Keene Mill) and Backlick roads. The post office name was changed in 1881 to Garfield to honor the late President James A. Garfield, who had been assassinated that year.

=== 20th century ===
In 1907, the Garfield post office closed and a new postal station named Corbett, after the then-landowner, opened back at the railroad station. The name "Springfield" was reinstated for good on June 27, 1910, although the name Garfield continued to appear on maps at least through the 1930s. The post office was moved to a new site in 1933.

Until at least 1946, Springfield remained a rural crossroads, when real estate developer Edward Carr decided to subdivide the area for suburban development along the recently opened Henry Shirley Highway (now I-95/I-395). Carr believed this to be the last easily accessible tract within 12 miles (19 km) of Washington, D.C., and the newly developed area grew quickly.

In 1950, the area had an estimated population of 1,000; Springfield United Methodist Church was established in 1954 and John Lewis High School (Formerly Robert E. Lee) was built in 1957. By 1960, the population was reported as over 10,000; it grew past 25,000 by 1970 with the North and West Springfield neighborhoods.

Between 1973 and 1975, Springfield became a major retail destination with the opening of the Springfield Mall, now Springfield Town Center. (the second regional shopping center in Northern Virginia after Tysons Corner), as well as the Springfield and Brookfield shopping centers.

In the 1980s and 1990s, retail and high-density housing expanded in the area, at least until the opening of the Franconia-Springfield Parkway in 1996, and the Franconia-Springfield Metro and Virginia Rail Express Station in 1997.

=== 21st century ===
The mall was renovated and re-opened in 2014.

== Buildings ==
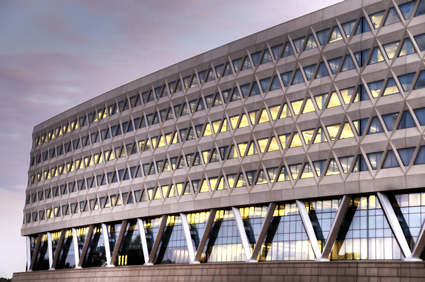
National Geospatial-Intelligence Agency building at the Fort Belvoir North Area in Springfield

The center of Springfield is at the intersection of Route 644 (Old Keene Mill Road / Franconia Road) and Route 617 (Backlick Road), which historically marked the location of Springfield’s original commercial core. This area has seen significant redevelopment since the early 2000s, including the construction of the Springfield Town Center and the adjacent Springfield Community Business Center, part of Fairfax County’s plan to encourage mixed-use development and urban revitalization.

The old “Garfield” name survives in Garfield Elementary School, one of the area’s long-standing public schools, reflecting a former community name used during the early 20th century.

One of the most prominent government buildings in Springfield is the headquarters of the National Geospatial-Intelligence Agency (NGA), located at the Fort Belvoir North Area (FBNA). Completed in 2011 at a cost of over $1.7 billion, the campus consolidated several NGA facilities from across the region into a state-of-the-art intelligence complex housing over 8,500 employees. The building spans approximately 2.4 million square feet and plays a critical role in national security, defense mapping, and satellite intelligence.

The historic Sydenstricker Schoolhouse, a one-room schoolhouse completed in 1928, is located near West Springfield and was added to the National Register of Historic Places in 2012. The building served as a public school and later as a community center and polling place. It remains one of the few surviving rural schoolhouses in Fairfax County and is maintained by the Upper Pohick Community League.

Other notable buildings in the Springfield area include:

- Springfield Town Center, a major retail and office complex redeveloped from the former Springfield Mall in 2014.
- Inova HealthPlex – Franconia/Springfield, a freestanding emergency and outpatient facility serving southeastern Fairfax County.
- Greater Springfield Volunteer Fire Department Station 22, serving the community since 1966 from its location on Backlick Road.

These civic, commercial, and historical structures reflect Springfield’s transformation from a rural rail stop into a densely developed suburban hub.

== Demographics ==
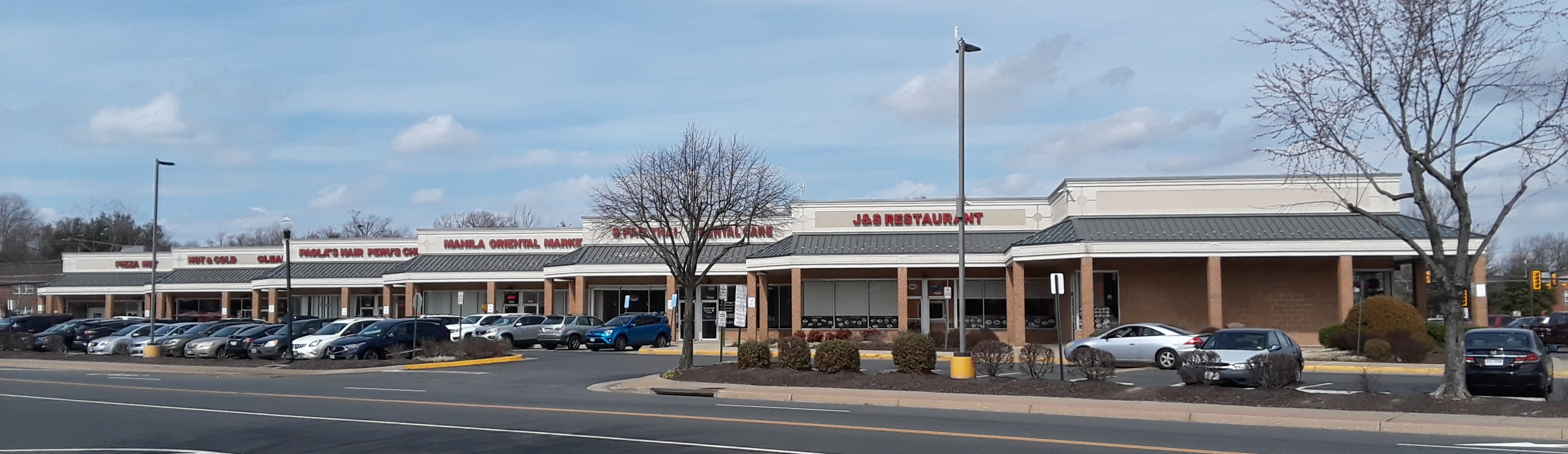
Commerce Plaza, one of a number of strip malls in Springfield containing a variety of ethnic restaurants

=== Racial and ethnic composition ===
Springfield CDP, Virginia – Racial and ethnic composition Note: the US Census treats Hispanic/Latino as an ethnic category. This table excludes Latinos from the racial categories and assigns them to a separate category. Hispanics/Latinos may be of any race.
Race / Ethnicity (NH = Non-Hispanic)	Pop 2000	Pop 2010	Pop 2020	% 2000	% 2010	% 2020
White alone (NH)	15,097	11,659	9,546	49.63%	38.25%	30.46%
Black or African American alone (NH)	2,650	2,659	3,065	8.71%	8.72%	9.78%
Native American or Alaska Native alone (NH)	36	38	34	0.12%	0.12%	0.11%
Asian alone (NH)	6,220	7,382	8,344	20.45%	24.22%	26.62%
Native Hawaiian or Pacific Islander alone (NH)	13	20	11	0.04%	0.07%	0.04%
Other race alone (NH)	70	116	175	0.23%	0.38%	0.56%
Mixed race or Multiracial (NH)	958	844	1,115	3.15%	2.77%	3.56%
Hispanic or Latino (any race)	5,373	7,766	9,049	17.66%	25.48%	28.87%
Total	30,417	30,484	31,339	100.00%	100.00%	100.00%

=== 2020 census ===
As of the 2020 census, Springfield had a population of 31,339. The median age was 39.9 years. 21.1% of residents were under the age of 18 and 18.1% of residents were 65 years of age or older. For every 100 females there were 95.3 males, and for every 100 females age 18 and over there were 92.6 males age 18 and over.

100.0% of residents lived in urban areas, while 0.0% lived in rural areas.

There were 10,130 households in Springfield, of which 33.2% had children under the age of 18 living in them. Of all households, 53.0% were married-couple households, 16.2% were households with a male householder and no spouse or partner present, and 26.7% were households with a female householder and no spouse or partner present. About 24.3% of all households were made up of individuals and 15.1% had someone living alone who was 65 years of age or older.

There were 10,563 housing units, of which 4.1% were vacant. The homeowner vacancy rate was 0.6% and the rental vacancy rate was 5.7%.

Racial composition as of the 2020 census
Race	Number	Percent
White	10,382	33.1%
Black or African American	3,121	10.0%
American Indian and Alaska Native	248	0.8%
Asian	8,385	26.8%
Native Hawaiian and Other Pacific Islander	17	0.1%
Some other race	5,479	17.5%
Two or more races	3,707	11.8%
Hispanic or Latino (of any race)	9,049	28.9%

=== Zip Code Tabulation Area profiles ===
According to Census Bureau 2020 ZCTA profiles for ZIP Codes 22150, 22151, 22152, and 22153, the Springfield ZIP Code Tabulation Areas had a combined population of 108,521 in 35,293 households. Median household income was $156,027. 58.9% of residents had a bachelor's degree or higher, and 27.5% had a graduate or professional degree. 26.2% of residents were employed by local, state, or federal governments, 9.5% were veterans, and 23.1% were under the age of 18.

	Total	22150	22151	22152	22153
Total population	108,521	27,955	18,026	29,843	32,697
Total households	35,293	9,373	5,506	9,443	10,971
Median household income	$156,027	$123,114	$156,015	$165,906	$174,228
Bachelor's degree or higher	58.9%	46.0%	52.7%	65.0%	67.7%
Graduate of professional degree	27.5%	20.3%	20.6%	31.2%	34.2%
Total housing units	36,385	9,703	5,820	9,723	11,139
Homeownership rate		63.4%	87.0%	85.8%	89.6%
Under 18 years old	23.1%	20.9%	20.1%	26.6%	23.6%
Local, state, or federal government worker	26.2%	22.8%	19.7%	30.4%	28.7%
Veteran	9.5%	9.1%	6.6%	10.0%	10.9%
Foreign-Born	29.7%	40.7%	32.5%	27.2%	20.9%
White	47.0%	32.8%	44.2%	53.5%	54.8%
Black	9.7%	10.0%	5.4%	10.0%	11.4%
Asian	20.4%	26.4%	24.4%	17.2%	15.9%
Native American	0.5%	0.8%	0.7%	0.4%	0.4%
Pacific Islander	0.1%	< 0.1%	0.1%	0.1%	0.1%
Some other race	9.7%	18.2%	12.9%	5.3%	4.6%
Two or more races	12.7%	11.8%	12.4%	13.6%	12.7%
Hispanic or Latino of any race	12.9%	29.7%	23.7%	15.0%	13.4%

Across the four ZIP Code Tabulation Areas, 47.0% of residents were White, 20.4% were Asian, 9.7% were Black, 9.7% were some other race, 0.5% were Native American, and 0.1% were Pacific Islander; 12.7% identified as two or more races, 29.7% were foreign-born, and 12.9% were Hispanic or Latino of any race.

== Transportation ==
=== Roads ===
Central Springfield is dominated by the Springfield Interchange, popularly known as the "Mixing Bowl" or the "Melting Pot", a name taken from an earlier interchange near the Pentagon. The interchange includes three Interstates (I-95, I-395, and I-495), with two exits less than a half mile apart, and two surface roads—Commerce Street and Route 644 (Old Keene Mill Road / Franconia Road)—crossing I-95 in close succession. The interchange is further complicated by a separate, reversible high-occupancy vehicle lane (HOV) facility passing through the center of two of the interstates, which has since been integrated into the region's Express Lanes network.

Built between 1999 and 2007 at a cost of $676 million, the Springfield Interchange Improvement Project was finished on time and on budget, according to the Virginia Department of Transportation, and was officially dedicated on July 18, 2007, by Virginia Governor Timothy M. Kaine.

As of the 2020s, the interchange handles over 430,000 vehicles per day, making it one of the busiest highway junctions in the Mid-Atlantic region. To accommodate growing demand and improve traffic flow, recent upgrades have included:

- Integration of Express Lanes: The reversible HOV lanes have been incorporated into the dynamically tolled I-95 Express Lanes system, extending south toward Fredericksburg and connecting north to I-395 Express Lanes toward Washington, D.C.
- Pedestrian and bicycle improvements: Fairfax County has implemented plans to improve crossings and create safer pedestrian and bicycle connections across Route 644 and Backlick Road, with long-term goals of encouraging mixed-use development near Springfield Town Center and Franconia–Springfield station.

Other major roads serving the Springfield area include:

- VA Route 644 (Old Keene Mill Road / Franconia Road)
- Backlick Road
- Rolling Road
- Commerce Street
- Fairfax County Parkway (VA 286)

These roads support both commuter and freight traffic and are closely tied to Springfield’s economic development and transportation planning.

=== Mass transit ===
==== Rail ====
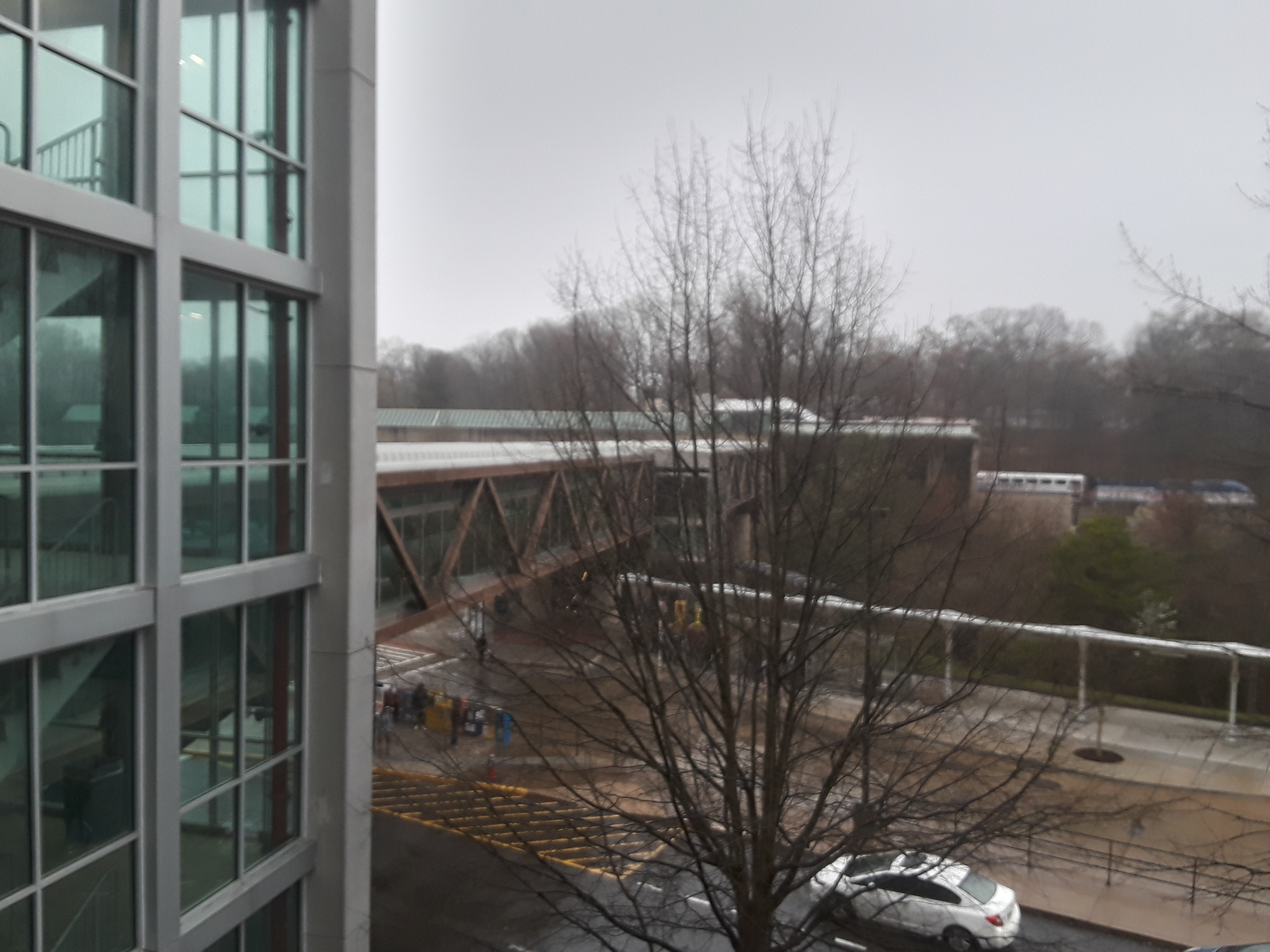
Franconia–Springfield Metro Station

Springfield is served by two major commuter rail systems that provide connectivity to Washington, D.C., and Northern Virginia suburbs.

- The Virginia Railway Express (VRE) operates two stations in Springfield on its Fredericksburg Line:
  - Backlick Road offers limited weekday service and is primarily used by local commuters from North Springfield and Ravensworth. It includes a small parking lot and sheltered platform.
  - Franconia–Springfield is a full-service regional hub shared by VRE and the Washington Metro. It includes a large parking garage, kiss-and-ride area, bus bays, and bicycle facilities.
- The Washington Metro's Blue Line terminates at Franconia–Springfield. The Metro station provides access to downtown Washington, Arlington, the Pentagon, and connections to the Yellow and Orange Lines.

==== Bus ====
Springfield is a transit hub served by several local, regional, and intercity bus services:

- Fairfax Connector provides local and express bus routes connecting Springfield to Burke, Lorton, Tysons, and the Franconia–Springfield Metro station. Notable routes include 306, 321/322, and 334.
- Washington Metropolitan Area Transit Authority (WMATA) operates several Metrobus routes through Springfield, including 18G/H/J, 17M, and 29K/N, which connect to the Pentagon, Landmark Mall, and Old Town Alexandria.
- OmniRide, operated by the Potomac and Rappahannock Transportation Commission, offers commuter buses between Prince William County and the Franconia–Springfield Metro station, primarily during peak hours.
- BestBus provides intercity service to New York City with occasional seasonal stops in the Springfield area, depending on demand and ticket sales.
- Greyhound operates regional and long-distance bus services from the Franconia–Springfield Transit Center, with direct routes to Richmond, Raleigh, and New York.

The Franconia–Springfield Transit Center serves as a multimodal hub integrating Metro, VRE, Fairfax Connector, Metrobus, and intercity services. It is part of Fairfax County’s ongoing plans for transit-oriented development in the Springfield Community Business Center.

=== Airports ===
Springfield is served by three major commercial airports and several smaller regional airports suitable for general aviation and military-connected travel.

- Ronald Reagan Washington National Airport (DCA) is the closest commercial airport, located about 13 miles northeast in Arlington County. It is the most convenient option for domestic flights and short-haul business travel, with service by all major U.S. carriers. It is accessible via the Washington Metro's Blue and Yellow Lines.
- Washington Dulles International Airport (IAD), about 27 miles northwest in Loudoun and Fairfax counties, is the primary international gateway for the region, with nonstop service to Europe, Asia, Africa, and Latin America. Since November 2022, it has been served by the Washington Metro’s Silver Line.
- Baltimore–Washington International Thurgood Marshall Airport (BWI) is located about 40 miles northeast in Linthicum, Maryland. BWI serves as a major hub for Southwest Airlines and offers both domestic and limited international service. It is accessible via Amtrak and MARC rail at the BWI Rail Station, with shuttle service to the terminal.

==== Regional and military-accessible airports ====
Several smaller regional airports serve the Springfield area and are commonly used for general aviation, private aircraft, and Space-Available (Space-A) military flights:

- Manassas Regional Airport (HEF), located about 25 miles west of Springfield, is the largest general aviation airport in Virginia. It supports charter flights, corporate jets, flight training, and private aircraft, with full-service fixed-base operators (FBOs) and U.S. Customs availability upon request.
- Davison Army Airfield, located within Fort Belvoir, just south of Springfield, is a U.S. Army airfield that occasionally supports Space-A military flights. Access is limited to DoD cardholders, and travelers must check with the Joint Base Andrews or Fort Belvoir passenger terminals for availability.
- Joint Base Andrews (ADW), located in Prince George’s County, Maryland, approximately 25 miles from Springfield, serves as a major hub for Space-A travel and military charter flights. It also hosts VIP and Air Force One operations. Service members, retirees, and their families can register for Space-A flights depending on mission availability and category.

These general aviation and military facilities offer additional flexibility for Springfield residents, particularly military families and federal employees who frequently travel on official or leisure status.

== Economy ==
The corporate headquarters of Ensco is physically located in the Ravensworth census-designated place, with a Springfield postal address.

Springfield is home to a number of corporate offices and federal contractors due to its strategic location near Washington, D.C., and its proximity to major highways and the Pentagon. Other employers in the region include VSE Corporation, which provides logistics and engineering support to government agencies, and several defense, intelligence, and IT firms clustered along Backlick Road and Port Royal Road in the Springfield Industrial Park.

The redevelopment of Springfield Mall into Springfield Town Center has played a significant role in revitalizing the local retail economy, attracting national retailers and dining establishments. The shopping center, now managed by PREIT, serves as the economic anchor for the Springfield Community Business Center (CBC), a designated redevelopment area supported by Fairfax County.

Springfield’s economy is also supported by the adjacent U.S. Army installation at Fort Belvoir, which provides direct and indirect employment to thousands of area residents. The nearby National Geospatial-Intelligence Agency (NGA) and Defense Logistics Agency (DLA) facilities further contribute to the area's federal employment base.

With ongoing infrastructure improvements and transit-oriented development plans around the Franconia–Springfield station, local planners envision continued growth in commercial office space, hospitality, and residential real estate.

== Education ==
Public schools in Springfield are run by Fairfax County Public Schools.

Some Springfield neighborhoods feed schools outside the census-designated place limits, such as the Lake Braddock, South County, and Hayfield districts. Likewise, some Springfield schools are fed by neighborhoods outside the CDP limits.

Elementary schools serving the Springfield area include: Cardinal Forest Elementary School (in West Springfield CDP), Crestwood Elementary School, Garfield Elementary School, Forestdale Elementary School, Hunt Valley Elementary School, Keene Mill Elementary School (West Springfield CDP), Kings Glen Elementary School, Kings Park Elementary School (in Kings Park CDP), Lynbrook Elementary School, Newington Forest Elementary School, North Springfield Elementary School (in North Springfield CDP), Orange Hunt Elementary School, Ravensworth Elementary School (in Ravensworth CDP), Rolling Valley Elementary School (West Springfield CDP), Sangster Elementary School, Springfield Estates Elementary School, Saratoga Elementary School, and West Springfield Elementary School (West Springfield CDP).

Middle schools serving Springfield include Francis Scott Key Middle School and Washington Irving Middle School (West Springfield CDP).

High schools serving Springfield include John Lewis High School (formerly Robert E. Lee) and West Springfield High School in West Springfield CDP; the latter is home to the West Springfield Dance Team, which appeared on the television show America's Got Talent.

Private schools in the vicinity of Springfield include St. Bernadette School (of the Roman Catholic Diocese of Arlington) in West Springfield CDP, Springfield Academy, the Word of Life Christian Academy, Iqra Elementary, and Al-Qalam Academy.

The medical campus of Northern Virginia Community College is located in Springfield. It offers a variety of associates degrees and certificates.

== Library ==
The Fairfax County Public Library system operates two public library branches that serve the Springfield area: the Richard Byrd Library and the Pohick Regional Library.

The Richard Byrd Library, located at 7250 Commerce Street, is named after famed aviator and explorer Richard E. Byrd, who was a native of Virginia. The library originally opened in 1965 and underwent a major renovation and expansion in 2010, which upgraded the building to 15,000 square feet and incorporated sustainable design features. It offers a wide selection of adult and youth materials, public computers, study rooms, a meeting space, and free Wi-Fi.

The Pohick Regional Library, located at 6450 Sydenstricker Road near Burke and West Springfield, serves as a regional hub for the southern part of Fairfax County. Opened in 1987 and extensively renovated in 2017, the library includes a large collection of books, periodicals, and digital resources. It also features expanded children's programming, a teen space, multiple group study rooms, assistive technology, and dedicated genealogy and local history resources. The branch is named for the nearby historic Pohick Church, which dates to the colonial era.

Both branches offer regular community programming such as children’s story times, English language conversation groups, author talks, and workshops on digital literacy, genealogy, and job readiness. They are also designated voting precincts during Fairfax County elections and serve as public gathering spaces for Springfield residents.

== Notable people ==
- Abelhaleem Hasan Abdelraziq Ashqar, Palestinian convicted of criminal contempt and obstruction of justice for refusal to testify in a trial related to the funding of Hamas in the US
- Antonio Bustamante, soccer player who represented the Bolivia national team
- Ashley Johnson and Kelley Johnson, footballers
- Brian Birdwell, member of the Texas Senate
- Brian Carroll, soccer player
- Bobby Wahl, MLB pitcher
- Chip Rives, businessman and former athlete
- Christina Tosi, chef, author, and TV personality
- Dave Albo, former member of the Virginia House of Delegates
- Doug Bandow, political writer
- Dave Grohl, musician; member of Nirvana and co-founder of Foo Fighters
- Eileen Filler-Corn, member and speaker of the Virginia House of Delegates
- Gary Groth, comic book publisher, editor, and critic
- Jannik Eckenrode, soccer player
- Jeffrey Davidow, diplomat
- José Alegría, soccer player
- Jose Llana, singer and Broadway actor
- Kara Lawson, head coach of the Duke Blue Devils women's basketball team, former WNBA player, graduate of West Springfield High School
- Kevin Schneider, officer in the United States Air Force
- Larry Bond, author and video game designer
- Lowell C. Kilday, diplomat
- Meghan Cox, soccer player
- Mike Caussin, NFL player
- Mohammed Seisay, NFL player
- Obi Enechionyia, basketball player
- Patrick G. Forrester, retired Army officer and astronaut
- Robert Girardi, author of military and detective fiction
- Rob Keefe, AFL coach
- Robert L. Schweitzer, United States Army general
- Ross H. Trower, rear admiral and chaplain in the United States Navy
- Warren E. Barry, former member of the Virginia General Assembly
- Suzanne Marie Collins, enlisted U.S. Marine and murder victim
- Thomas P. Shoesmith, diplomat
- Tracy Stone-Manning, environmental policy advisor
- Virginia Thrasher, sports shooter
- William Drohan, educator and microbiologist
- Lily Yohannes, soccer player
- John Engelberger, NFL player
