= List of teams and cyclists in the 1989 Tour de France =

List of cyclists

The number of riders per nation participated in the 1989 Tour de France: 20+ / 10–19 / 2–9 / 1

The 1989 Tour de France was the 76th edition of Tour de France, one of cycling's Grand Tours. The Tour began in Luxembourg on 1 July and finished on the Champs-Élysées in Paris on 23 July. The Tour organisation invited 22 teams to the Tour, with 9 cyclists each.

== Teams ==
Qualified teams

- Reynolds
- PDM–Ultima–Concorde
- Helvetia–La Suisse
- Super U–Raleigh–Fiat
- Z–Peugeot
- BH
- Panasonic–Isostar–Colnago–Agu
- Hitachi–VTM
- Paternina
- Carrera Jeans–Vagabond
- RMO
- Histor–Sigma
- Chateau d'Ax
- Toshiba
- Domex–Weinmann
- Superconfex–Yoko–Opel–Colnago
- TVM–Ragno
- AD Renting–W-Cup–Bottecchia

Invited teams

- Kelme
- Café de Colombia
- 7-Eleven
- Fagor–MBK

== Cyclists ==
Legend
No.	Starting number worn by the rider during the Tour
Pos.	Position in the general classification
Time	Deficit to the winner of the general classification
General classification	Denotes the winner of the general classification
Points classification	Denotes the winner of the points classification
Mountains classification	Denotes the winner of the mountains classification
Intermediate Sprint classification	Denotes the winner of the intermediate sprints classification
Combination classification	Denotes the winner of the combination classification
Team classification	Denotes the winner of the team classification
Combativity award	Denotes the winner of the combativity award
DNF	Denotes a rider who did not finish
NP	Denotes a rider who was a non-participant
AB	Denotes a rider who abandoned
EL	Denotes a rider who was eliminated
HD	Denotes a rider who was outside the time limit (French: Hors Delai)
Age correct as of 1 July 1989, the date on which the Tour began

=== By starting number ===
No.	Name	Nationality	Team	Age	Pos.	Time	Ref
1	Pedro Delgado	Spain	Reynolds–Banesto	29	3	+ 3' 34"	
2	Dominique Arnaud	France	Reynolds–Banesto	33	30	+ 55' 23"	
3	Julián Gorospe	Spain	Reynolds–Banesto	29	62	+ 1h 39' 31"	
4	Miguel Induráin	Spain	Reynolds–Banesto	24	17	+ 31' 21"	
5	Luis Javier Lukin	Spain	Reynolds–Banesto	25	56	+ 1h 33' 53"	
6	Melcior Mauri	Spain	Reynolds–Banesto	23	92	+ 2h 01' 22"	
7	William Palacio	Colombia	Reynolds–Banesto	24	25	+ 45' 42"	
8	Jesús Rodríguez Magro	Spain	Reynolds–Banesto	29	33	+ 1h 02' 41"	
9	Abelardo Rondón	Colombia	Reynolds–Banesto	25	28	+ 53' 17"	
11	Steven Rooks	Netherlands	PDM	28	7	+ 11' 10"	
12	Raúl Alcalá	Mexico	PDM	25	8	+ 14' 21"	
13	Rudy Dhaenens	Belgium	PDM	28	DNF (NP-18)	—	
14	Johannes Draaijer	Netherlands	PDM	26	130	+ 2h 35' 02"	
15	Martin Earley	Ireland	PDM	27	44	+ 1h 26' 45"	
16	Sean Kelly	Ireland	PDM	33	9	+ 18' 25"	
17	Jörg Müller	Switzerland	PDM	28	29	+ 55' 00"	
18	Gert-Jan Theunisse	Netherlands	PDM	26	4	+ 7' 30"	
19	Marc van Orsouw	Netherlands	PDM	25	87	+ 1h 55' 48"	
21	Fabio Parra	Colombia	Kelme	29	DNF (AB-11)	—	
22	Iñaki Gastón	Spain	Kelme	26	DNF (AB-10)	—	
23	Manuel Guijarro Doménech	Spain	Kelme	26	DNF (HD-2)	—	
24	Omar Hernández	Colombia	Kelme	27	DNF (HD-7)	—	
25	Juan Martínez Oliver	Spain	Kelme	25	DNF (HD-10)	—	
26	Pedro Saúl Morales	Colombia	Kelme	29	DNF (AB-3)	—	
27	Humberto Parra	Colombia	Kelme	24	DNF (HD-7)	—	
28	José Hipolito Roncancio	Colombia	Kelme	23	DNF (AB-11)	—	
29	Jaime Vilamajó	Spain	Kelme	29	DNF (HD-10)	—	
31	Steve Bauer	Canada	Helvetia–La Suisse	30	15	+ 31' 16"	
32	Mauro Gianetti	Switzerland	Helvetia–La Suisse	25	115	+ 2h 24' 56"	
33	Jean-Claude Leclercq	France	Helvetia–La Suisse	26	68	+ 1h 43' 26"	
34	Henri Manders	Netherlands	Helvetia–La Suisse	29	104	+ 2h 13' 35"	
35	Pascal Richard	Switzerland	Helvetia–La Suisse	25	23	+ 42' 07"	
36	Niki Rüttimann	Switzerland	Helvetia–La Suisse	26	DNF (AB-17)	—	
37	Peter Stevenhaagen	Netherlands	Helvetia–La Suisse	24	50	+ 1h 28' 18"	
38	Frédéric Vichot	France	Helvetia–La Suisse	30	37	+ 1h 09' 25"	
39	Michael Wilson	Australia	Helvetia–La Suisse	29	69	+ 1h 44' 05"	
41	Laurent Fignon	France	Super U	28	2	+ 8"	
42	Vincent Barteau	France	Super U	27	97	+ 2h 07' 18"	
43	Dominique Garde	France	Super U	30	52	+ 1h 28' 53"	
44	Heinz Imboden	Switzerland	Super U	27	DNF (AB-10)	—	
45	Christophe Lavainne	France	Super U	25	64	+ 1h 40' 15"	
46	Thierry Marie	France	Super U	26	72	+ 1h 48' 22"	
47	Bjarne Riis	Denmark	Super U	25	95	+ 2h 03' 37"	
48	Gérard Rué	France	Super U	23	35	+ 1h 03' 33"	
49	Pascal Simon	France	Super U	32	13	+ 28' 28"	
51	Luis Herrera	Colombia	Café de Colombia	28	19	+ 36' 15"	
52	Samuel Cabrera	Colombia	Café de Colombia	28	49	+ 1h 27' 57"	
53	Julio César Cadena	Colombia	Café de Colombia	25	76	+ 1h 49' 57"	
54	Alberto Camargo	Colombia	Café de Colombia	22	20	+ 37' 13"	
55	Henry Cárdenas	Colombia	Café de Colombia	23	DNF (NP-5)	—	
56	Martín Ramírez	Colombia	Café de Colombia	28	DNF (AB-9)	—	
57	Bernard Richard	France	Café de Colombia	31	82	+ 1h 53' 14"	
58	Mario Scirea	Italy	Café de Colombia	24	DNF (HD-10)	—	
59	Jesper Worre	Denmark	Café de Colombia	30	88	+ 1h 57' 23"	
61	Éric Boyer	France	Z–Peugeot	25	DNF (NP-13)	—	
62	Philippe Casado	France	Z–Peugeot	25	93	+ 2h 01' 43"	
63	Bruno Cornillet	France	Z–Peugeot	26	14	+ 28' 31"	
64	Atle Kvålsvoll	Norway	Z–Peugeot	27	46	+ 1h 27' 08"	
65	François Lemarchand	France	Z–Peugeot	28	89	+ 1h 58' 50"	
66	Philippe Louviot	France	Z–Peugeot	25	59	+ 1h 36' 19"	
67	Robert Millar	Great Britain	Z–Peugeot	30	10	+ 18' 46"	
68	Ronan Pensec	France	Z–Peugeot	25	58	+ 1h 35' 02"	
69	Jérôme Simon	France	Z–Peugeot	28	18	+ 34' 10"	
71	Álvaro Pino	Spain	BH	32	16	+ 31' 17"	
72	Francisco Antequera	Spain	BH	25	111	+ 2h 20' 29"	
73	Philippe Bouvatier	France	BH	25	DNF (HD-7)	—	
74	Laudelino Cubino	Spain	BH	26	DNF (AB-15)	—	
75	Federico Echave	Spain	BH	28	DNF (NP-15)	—	
76	Anselmo Fuerte	Spain	BH	27	26	+ 48' 39"	
77	Juan Jusdado	Spain	BH	22	131	+ 2h 35' 49"	
78	Javier Murguialday	Spain	BH	27	48	+ 1h 27' 37"	
79	Joël Pelier	France	BH	27	128	+ 2h 33' 48"	
81	Erik Breukink	Netherlands	Panasonic–Isostar	25	DNF (AB-13)	—	
82	Theo de Rooij	Netherlands	Panasonic–Isostar	32	125	+ 2h 32' 32"	
83	Henk Lubberding	Netherlands	Panasonic–Isostar	35	119	+ 2h 27' 27"	
84	Guy Nulens	Belgium	Panasonic–Isostar	31	55	+ 1h 33' 29"	
85	John Talen	Netherlands	Panasonic–Isostar	24	DNF (HD-10)	—	
86	Jean-Paul van Poppel	Netherlands	Panasonic–Isostar	26	DNF (HD-10)	—	
87	Teun van Vliet	Netherlands	Panasonic–Isostar	27	124	+ 2h 31' 22"	
88	Eric Vanderaerden	Belgium	Panasonic–Isostar	27	DNF (HD-10)	—	
89	Jean-Marie Wampers	Belgium	Panasonic–Isostar	30	133	+ 2h 38' 59"	
91	Claude Criquielion	Belgium	Hitachi-VTM	32	36	+ 1h 04' 07"	
92	Hendrik Devos	Belgium	Hitachi-VTM	33	113	+ 2h 22' 48"	
93	Dirk De Wolf	Belgium	Hitachi-VTM	28	66	+ 1h 41' 50"	
94	Jos Haex	Belgium	Hitachi-VTM	29	DNF (NP-13)	—	
95	Patrick Jacobs	Belgium	Hitachi-VTM	26	DNF (AB-19)	—	
96	Jozef Lieckens	Belgium	Hitachi-VTM	30	DNF (HD-10)	—	
97	Danny Lippens	Belgium	Hitachi-VTM	27	DNF (AB-14)	—	
98	Marc Sergeant	Belgium	Hitachi-VTM	29	61	+ 1h 38' 41"	
99	Jos van Aert	Netherlands	Hitachi-VTM	26	DNF (AB-12)	—	
101	Andrew Hampsten	United States	7 Eleven-American Airlines	27	22	+ 41' 41"	
102	Nathan Dahlberg	New Zealand	7 Eleven-American Airlines	25	DNF (AB-18)	—	
103	Ron Kiefel	United States	7 Eleven-American Airlines	29	73	+ 1h 48' 38"	
104	Roy Knickman	United States	7 Eleven-American Airlines	24	DNF (HD-18)	—	
105	Dag Otto Lauritzen	Norway	7 Eleven-American Airlines	32	DNF (NP-5)	—	
106	Jeff Pierce	United States	7 Eleven-American Airlines	30	86	+ 1h 54' 58"	
107	Jens Veggerby	Denmark	7 Eleven-American Airlines	26	DNF (EL-10)	—	
108	Sean Yates	Great Britain	7 Eleven-American Airlines	29	45	+ 1h 27' 04"	
109	Gerhard Zadrobilek	Austria	7 Eleven-American Airlines	28	60	+ 1h 37' 24"	
111	Marino Lejarreta	Spain	Paternina–Marcos Eguizabal	32	5	+ 9' 39"	
112	René Beuker	Netherlands	Paternina–Marcos Eguizabal	24	135	+ 2h 40' 49"	
113	Mathieu Hermans	Netherlands	Paternina–Marcos Eguizabal	26	138	+ 3h 04' 01"	
114	Stephen Hodge	Australia	Paternina–Marcos Eguizabal	27	83	+ 1h 53' 35"	
115	Roland Le Clerc	France	Paternina–Marcos Eguizabal	26	116	+ 2h 25' 15"	
116	Jokin Mújika	Spain	Paternina–Marcos Eguizabal	26	78	+ 1h 50' 56"	
117	Erwin Nijboer	Netherlands	Paternina–Marcos Eguizabal	25	DNF (AB-17)	—	
118	Ludo Peeters	Belgium	Paternina–Marcos Eguizabal	35	63	+ 1h 39' 58"	
119	Helmut Wechselberger	Austria	Paternina–Marcos Eguizabal	36	42	+ 1h 21' 11"	
121	Urs Zimmermann	Switzerland	Carrera Jeans–Vagabond	29	DNF (NP-17)	—	
122	Guido Bontempi	Italy	Carrera Jeans–Vagabond	29	DNF (AB-10)	—	
123	Primož Čerin	Yugoslavia	Carrera Jeans–Vagabond	27	40	+ 1h 16' 36"	
124	Claudio Chiappucci	Italy	Carrera Jeans–Vagabond	26	81	+ 1h 53' 04"	
125	Acácio da Silva	Portugal	Carrera Jeans–Vagabond	28	84	+ 1h 54' 16"	
126	Erich Mächler	Switzerland	Carrera Jeans–Vagabond	28	117	+ 2h 26' 57"	
127	Walter Magnago	Italy	Carrera Jeans–Vagabond	28	134	+ 2h 40' 16"	
128	Jure Pavlič	Yugoslavia	Carrera Jeans–Vagabond	26	74	+ 1h 49' 08"	
129	Giancarlo Perini	Italy	Carrera Jeans–Vagabond	29	102	+ 2h 12' 09"	
131	Charly Mottet	France	RMO–Mavic–Liberia	26	6	+ 10' 06"	
132	Éric Caritoux	France	RMO–Mavic–Liberia	28	12	+ 28' 14"	
133	Thierry Claveyrolat	France	RMO–Mavic–Liberia	30	DNF (AB-9)	—	
134	Jean-Claude Colotti	France	RMO–Mavic–Liberia	22	67	+ 1h 42' 28"	
135	Christian Jourdan	France	RMO–Mavic–Liberia	34	118	+ 2h 27' 15"	
136	Per Pedersen	Denmark	RMO–Mavic–Liberia	25	85	+ 1h 54' 42"	
137	Franck Pineau	France	RMO–Mavic–Liberia	26	57	+ 1h 33' 59"	
138	Gilles Sanders	France	RMO–Mavic–Liberia	24	54	+ 1h 31' 31'	
139	Michel Vermote	Belgium	RMO–Mavic–Liberia	26	70	+ 1h 46' 05"	
141	Greg LeMond	United States	ADR–Agrigel–Bottechia	28	1	87h 38' 35"	
142	Frank Hoste	Belgium	ADR–Agrigel–Bottechia	33	DNF (EL-10)	—	
143	Jaanus Kuum	Norway	ADR–Agrigel–Bottechia	24	DNF (EL-10)	—	
144	Johan Lammerts	Netherlands	ADR–Agrigel–Bottechia	28	123	+ 2h 31' 13"	
145	René Martens	Belgium	ADR–Agrigel–Bottechia	34	91	+ 2h 01' 20"	
146	Johan Museeuw	Belgium	ADR–Agrigel–Bottechia	23	106	+ 2h 13' 51"	
147	Eddy Planckaert	Belgium	ADR–Agrigel–Bottechia	30	DNF (AB-18)	—	
148	Ronny Van Holen	Belgium	ADR–Agrigel–Bottechia	30	DNF (AB-12)	—	
149	Filip Van Vooren	Belgium	ADR–Agrigel–Bottechia	26	DNF (AB-10)	—	
151	Stephen Roche	Ireland	Fagor	29	DNF (NP-10)	—	
152	Laurent Biondi	France	Fagor	29	31	+ 1h 00' 41"	
153	John Carlsen	Denmark	Fagor	27	53	+ 1h 30' 05"	
154	Christian Chaubet	France	Fagor	27	79	+ 1h 52' 18"	
155	Robert Forest	France	Fagor	27	75	+ 1h 49' 39"	
156	Paul Kimmage	Ireland	Fagor	27	DNF (AB-12)	—	
157	Vincent Lavenu	France	Fagor	33	65	+ 1h 41' 46"	
158	Francesco Rossignoli	Italy	Fagor	26	DNF (NP-13)	—	
159	Eddy Schepers	Belgium	Fagor	33	DNF (AB-14)	—	
161	Luc Roosen	Belgium	Histor Sigma–Fina	24	27	+ 51' 28"	
162	Etienne De Wilde	Belgium	Histor Sigma–Fina	31	101	+ 2h 10' 29"	
163	Herman Frison	Belgium	Histor Sigma–Fina	28	DNF (AB-14)	—	
164	Søren Lilholt	Denmark	Histor Sigma–Fina	23	DNF (AB-12)	—	
165	Jan Nevens	Belgium	Histor Sigma–Fina	30	DNF (AB-6)	—	
166	Rudy Patry	Belgium	Histor Sigma–Fina	27	DNF (HD-10)	—	
167	Wilfried Peeters	Belgium	Histor Sigma–Fina	24	105	+ 2h 13' 38"	
168	Brian Holm	Denmark	Histor Sigma–Fina	26	109	+ 2h 18' 57"	
169	Rik Van Slycke	Belgium	Histor Sigma–Fina	26	98	+ 2h 07' 29"	
171	Gianni Bugno	Italy	Chateau d'Ax	25	11	+ 24' 12"	
172	Ettore Badolato	Italy	Chateau d'Ax	25	DNF (NP-17)	—	
173	Giovanni Fidanza	Italy	Chateau d'Ax	23	127	+ 2h 33' 37"	
174	Camillo Passera	Italy	Chateau d'Ax	24	94	+ 2h 03' 10"	
175	Valerio Tebaldi	Italy	Chateau d'Ax	23	122	+ 2h 31' 09"	
176	Ennio Vanotti	Italy	Chateau d'Ax	33	126	+ 2h 33' 17"	
177	Alberto Volpi	Italy	Chateau d'Ax	26	DNF (NP-13)	—	
178	Franco Vona	Italy	Chateau d'Ax	24	DNF (AB-17)	—	
179	Stefano Zanatta	Italy	Chateau d'Ax	25	DNF (AB-6)	—	
181	Laurent Bezault	France	Toshiba	23	43	+ 1h 22' 09"	
182	Martial Gayant	France	Toshiba	26	32	+ 1h 02' 33"	
183	Andreas Kappes	West Germany	Toshiba	23	96	+ 2h 03' 56"	
184	Philippe Leleu	France	Toshiba	31	90	+ 2h 00' 46"	
185	Marc Madiot	France	Toshiba	30	34	+ 1h 02' 46"	
186	Yvon Madiot	France	Toshiba	27	47	+ 1h 27' 30"	
187	Fabrice Philipot	France	Toshiba	23	24	+ 44' 43"	
188	Pascal Poisson	France	Toshiba	31	71	+ 1h 47' 52"	
189	Denis Roux	France	Toshiba	27	DNF (NP-13)	—	
191	Adri van der Poel	Netherlands	Domex–Weinmann	30	DNF (AB-10)	—	
192	Alfred Achermann	Switzerland	Domex–Weinmann	29	80	+ 1h 53' 02"	
193	Carlo Bomans	Belgium	Domex–Weinmann	26	137	+ 3h 01' 01"	
194	Beat Breu	Switzerland	Domex–Weinmann	31	21	+ 38' 35"	
195	Michel Dernies	Belgium	Domex–Weinmann	28	108	+ 2h 17' 36"	
196	Maarten Ducrot	Netherlands	Domex–Weinmann	31	39	+ 1h 14' 47"	
197	Jan Goessens	Belgium	Domex–Weinmann	26	112	+ 2h 22' 42"	
198	Patrick Robeet	Belgium	Domex–Weinmann	24	51	+ 1h 28' 47"	
199	Thomas Wegmüller	Switzerland	Domex–Weinmann	28	100	+ 2h 09' 58"	
201	Rolf Gölz	West Germany	SuperConfex–Yoko–Opel	26	DNF (AB-17)	—	
202	Gert Jakobs	Netherlands	SuperConfex–Yoko–Opel	25	136	+ 2h 54' 16"	
203	Frans Maassen	Netherlands	SuperConfex–Yoko–Opel	24	103	+ 2h 12' 27"	
204	Jelle Nijdam	Netherlands	SuperConfex–Yoko–Opel	25	121	+ 2h 28' 29"	
205	Twan Poels	Netherlands	SuperConfex–Yoko–Opel	25	114	+ 2h 23' 45"	
206	Noël Segers	Belgium	SuperConfex–Yoko–Opel	29	DNF (HD-9)	—	
207	Gerrit Solleveld	Netherlands	SuperConfex–Yoko–Opel	28	107	+ 2h 16' 56"	
208	Patrick Tolhoek	Netherlands	SuperConfex–Yoko–Opel	24	99	+ 2h 08' 06"	
209	Edwig Van Hooydonck	Belgium	SuperConfex–Yoko–Opel	22	110	+ 2h 19' 05"	
211	Phil Anderson	Australia	TVM	31	38	+ 1h 11' 38"	
212	Johan Capiot	Belgium	TVM	25	DNF (HD-2)	—	
213	Jacques Hanegraaf	Netherlands	TVM	28	129	+ 2h 34' 43"	
214	Rob Kleinsman	Netherlands	TVM	26	DNF (AB-17)	—	
215	Peter Pieters	Netherlands	TVM	27	DNF (HD-10)	—	
216	Eddy Schurer	Netherlands	TVM	24	132	+ 2h 36' 30"	
217	Jan Siemons	Netherlands	TVM	25	120	+ 2h 28' 00"	
218	Jesper Skibby	Denmark	TVM	25	41	+ 1h 18' 00"	
219	Jean-Philippe Vandenbrande	Belgium	TVM	33	77	+ 1h 50' 24"	

=== By team ===
Reynolds–Banesto
No.	Rider	Pos.
1	Pedro Delgado (ESP)	3
2	Dominique Arnaud (FRA)	30
3	Julián Gorospe (ESP)	62
4	Miguel Induráin (ESP)	17
5	Luis Javier Lukin (ESP)	56
6	Melcior Mauri (ESP)	92
7	William Palacio (COL)	25
8	Jesús Rodríguez Magro (ESP)	33
9	Abelardo Rondón (COL)	28
Directeur sportif: José Miguel Echavarri

PDM
No.	Rider	Pos.
11	Steven Rooks (NED)	7
12	Raúl Alcalá (MEX)	8
13	Rudy Dhaenens (BEL)	NP-18
14	Johannes Draaijer (NED)	130
15	Martin Earley (IRL)	44
16	Sean Kelly (IRL)	9
17	Jörg Müller (SUI)	29
18	Gert-Jan Theunisse (NED)	4
19	Marc van Orsouw (NED)	87
Directeur sportif: Jan Gijsbers

Kelme
No.	Rider	Pos.
21	Fabio Parra (COL)	AB-11
22	Iñaki Gastón (ESP)	AB-10
23	Manuel Guijarro Doménech (ESP)	HD-2
24	Omar Hernández (COL)	HD-7
25	Juan Martínez Oliver (ESP)	HD-10
26	Pedro Saúl Morales (COL)	AB-3
27	Humberto Parra (COL)	HD-7
28	José Hipolito Roncancio (COL)	AB-11
29	Jaime Vilamajó (ESP)	HD-10
Directeur sportif: Rafael Carrasco

Helvetia–La Suisse
No.	Rider	Pos.
31	Steve Bauer (CAN)	15
32	Mauro Gianetti (SUI)	115
33	Jean-Claude Leclercq (FRA)	68
34	Henri Manders (NED)	104
35	Pascal Richard (SUI)	23
36	Niki Rüttimann (SUI)	AB-17
37	Peter Stevenhaagen (NED)	50
38	Frédéric Vichot (FRA)	37
39	Michael Wilson (AUS)	69
Directeur sportif: Paul Köchli

Super U
No.	Rider	Pos.
41	Laurent Fignon (FRA)	2
42	Vincent Barteau (FRA)	97
43	Dominique Garde (FRA)	52
44	Heinz Imboden (SUI)	AB-10
45	Christophe Lavainne (FRA)	64
46	Thierry Marie (FRA)	72
47	Bjarne Riis (DEN)	95
48	Gérard Rué (FRA)	35
49	Pascal Simon (FRA)	13
Directeur sportif: Cyrille Guimard

Café de Colombia
No.	Rider	Pos.
51	Luis Herrera (COL)	19
52	Samuel Cabrera (COL)	49
53	Julio César Cadena (COL)	76
54	Alberto Camargo (COL)	20
55	Henry Cárdenas (COL)	NP-5
56	Martín Ramírez (COL)	AB-9
57	Bernard Richard (FRA)	82
58	Mario Scirea (ITA)	HD-10
59	Jesper Worre (DEN)	88
Directeur sportif: Rafael Antonio Niño

Z–Peugeot
No.	Rider	Pos.
61	Éric Boyer (FRA)	NP-13
62	Philippe Casado (FRA)	93
63	Bruno Cornillet (FRA)	14
64	Atle Kvålsvoll (NOR)	46
65	François Lemarchand (FRA)	89
66	Philippe Louviot (FRA)	59
67	Robert Millar (GBR)	10
68	Ronan Pensec (FRA)	58
69	Jérôme Simon (FRA)	18
Directeur sportif: Roger Legeay

BH
No.	Rider	Pos.
71	Álvaro Pino (ESP)	16
72	Francisco Antequera (ESP)	111
73	Philippe Bouvatier (FRA)	HD-7
74	Laudelino Cubino (ESP)	AB-15
75	Federico Echave (ESP)	NP-15
76	Anselmo Fuerte (ESP)	26
77	Juan Jusdado (ESP)	131
78	Javier Murguialday (ESP)	48
79	Joël Pelier (FRA)	128
Directeur sportif: Javier Minguez Bellosta

Panasonic–Isostar
No.	Rider	Pos.
81	Erik Breukink (NED)	AB-13
82	Theo de Rooij (NED)	125
83	Henk Lubberding (NED)	119
84	Guy Nulens (BEL)	55
85	John Talen (NED)	HD-10
86	Jean-Paul van Poppel (NED)	HD-10
87	Teun van Vliet (NED)	124
88	Eric Vanderaerden (BEL)	HD-10
89	Jean-Marie Wampers (BEL)	133
Directeur sportif: Peter Post

Hitachi-VTM
No.	Rider	Pos.
91	Claude Criquielion (BEL)	36
92	Hendrik Devos (BEL)	113
93	Dirk De Wolf (BEL)	66
94	Jos Haex (BEL)	NP-13
95	Patrick Jacobs (BEL)	AB-19
96	Jozef Lieckens (BEL)	HD-10
97	Danny Lippens (BEL)	AB-14
98	Marc Sergeant (BEL)	61
99	Jos van Aert (NED)	AB-12
Directeur sportif: Albert De Kimpe

7 Eleven-American Airlines
No.	Rider	Pos.
101	Andrew Hampsten (USA)	22
102	Nathan Dahlberg (NZL)	AB-18
103	Ron Kiefel (USA)	73
104	Roy Knickman (USA)	HD-18
105	Dag Otto Lauritzen (NOR)	NP-5
106	Jeff Pierce (USA)	86
107	Jens Veggerby (DEN)	EL-10
108	Sean Yates (GBR)	45
109	Gerhard Zadrobilek (AUT)	60
Directeur sportif: Noël Dejonckheere

Paternina–Marcos Eguizabal
No.	Rider	Pos.
111	Marino Lejarreta (ESP)	5
112	René Beuker (NED)	135
113	Mathieu Hermans (NED)	138
114	Stephen Hodge (AUS)	83
115	Roland Le Clerc (FRA)	116
116	Jokin Mújika (ESP)	78
117	Erwin Nijboer (NED)	AB-17
118	Ludo Peeters (BEL)	63
119	Helmut Wechselberger (AUT)	42
Directeur sportif: Domingo Perurena

Carrera Jeans–Vagabond
No.	Rider	Pos.
121	Urs Zimmermann (SUI)	NP-17
122	Guido Bontempi (ITA)	AB-10
123	Primož Čerin (YUG)	40
124	Claudio Chiappucci (ITA)	81
125	Acácio da Silva (POR)	84
126	Erich Mächler (SUI)	117
127	Walter Magnago (ITA)	134
128	Jure Pavlič (YUG)	74
129	Giancarlo Perini (ITA)	102
Directeur sportif: Davide Boifava

RMO–Mavic–Liberia
No.	Rider	Pos.
131	Charly Mottet (FRA)	6
132	Éric Caritoux (FRA)	12
133	Thierry Claveyrolat (FRA)	AB-9
134	Jean-Claude Colotti (FRA)	67
135	Christian Jourdan (FRA)	118
136	Per Pedersen (DEN)	85
137	Franck Pineau (FRA)	57
138	Gilles Sanders (FRA)	54
139	Michel Vermote (BEL)	70
Directeur sportif: Bernard Vallet

ADR–Agrigel–Bottechia
No.	Rider	Pos.
141	Greg LeMond (USA)	1
142	Frank Hoste (BEL)	EL-10
143	Jaanus Kuum (NOR)	EL-10
144	Johan Lammerts (NED)	123
145	René Martens (BEL)	91
146	Johan Museeuw (BEL)	106
147	Eddy Planckaert (BEL)	AB-18
148	Ronny Van Holen (BEL)	AB-12
149	Filip Van Vooren (BEL)	AB-10
Directeur sportif: José De Cauwer

Fagor
No.	Rider	Pos.
151	Stephen Roche (IRL)	NP-10
152	Laurent Biondi (FRA)	31
153	John Carlsen (DEN)	53
154	Christian Chaubet (FRA)	79
155	Robert Forest (FRA)	75
156	Paul Kimmage (IRL)	AB-12
157	Vincent Lavenu (FRA)	65
158	Francesco Rossignoli (ITA)	NP-13
159	Eddy Schepers (BEL)	AB-14
Directeur sportif: Pierre Bazzo

Histor Sigma–Fina
No.	Rider	Pos.
161	Luc Roosen (BEL)	27
162	Etienne De Wilde (BEL)	101
163	Herman Frison (BEL)	AB-14
164	Søren Lilholt (DEN)	AB-12
165	Jan Nevens (BEL)	AB-6
166	Rudy Patry (BEL)	HD-10
167	Wilfried Peeters (BEL)	105
168	Brian Holm (DEN)	109
169	Rik Van Slycke (BEL)	98
Directeur sportif: Willy Teirlinck

Chateau d'Ax
No.	Rider	Pos.
171	Gianni Bugno (ITA)	11
172	Ettore Badolato (ITA)	NP-17
173	Giovanni Fidanza (ITA)	127
174	Camillo Passera (ITA)	94
175	Valerio Tebaldi (ITA)	122
176	Ennio Vanotti (ITA)	126
177	Alberto Volpi (ITA)	NP-13
178	Franco Vona (ITA)	AB-17
179	Stefano Zanatta (ITA)	AB-6
Directeur sportif: Gianluigi Stanga

Toshiba
No.	Rider	Pos.
181	Laurent Bezault (FRA)	43
182	Martial Gayant (FRA)	32
183	Andreas Kappes (FRG)	96
184	Philippe Leleu (FRA)	90
185	Marc Madiot (FRA)	34
186	Yvon Madiot (FRA)	47
187	Fabrice Philipot (FRA)	24
188	Pascal Poisson (FRA)	71
189	Denis Roux (FRA)	NP-13
Directeur sportif: Yves Hézard

Domex–Weinmann
No.	Rider	Pos.
191	Adri van der Poel (NED)	AB-10
192	Alfred Achermann (SUI)	80
193	Carlo Bomans (BEL)	137
194	Beat Breu (SUI)	21
195	Michel Dernies (BEL)	108
196	Maarten Ducrot (NED)	39
197	Jan Goessens (BEL)	112
198	Patrick Robeet (BEL)	51
199	Thomas Wegmüller (SUI)	100
Directeur sportif: Walter Godefroot

SuperConfex–Yoko–Opel
No.	Rider	Pos.
201	Rolf Gölz (FRG)	AB-17
202	Gert Jakobs (NED)	136
203	Frans Maassen (NED)	103
204	Jelle Nijdam (NED)	121
205	Twan Poels (NED)	114
206	Noël Segers (BEL)	HD-9
207	Gerrit Solleveld (NED)	107
208	Patrick Tolhoek (NED)	99
209	Edwig Van Hooydonck (BEL)	110
Directeur sportif: Jan Raas

TVM
No.	Rider	Pos.
211	Phil Anderson (AUS)	38
212	Johan Capiot (BEL)	HD-2
213	Jacques Hanegraaf (NED)	129
214	Rob Kleinsman (NED)	AB-17
215	Peter Pieters (NED)	HD-10
216	Eddy Schurer (NED)	132
217	Jan Siemons (NED)	120
218	Jesper Skibby (DEN)	41
219	Jean-Philippe Vandenbrande (BEL)	77
Directeur sportif: Cees Priem

=== By nationality ===
The 198 riders that competed in the 1989 Tour de France represented 20 countries. Riders from eleven countries won stages during the race; Netherlands riders won the largest number of stages.

Country	No. of riders	Finishers	Stage wins
Australia	3	3	
Austria	2	2	
Belgium	36	20	1 (Etienne De Wilde)
Canada	1	1	
Colombia	13	6	
Denmark	8	6	
France	40	36	3 (Joël Pelier, Vincent Barteau, Laurent Fignon)
Ireland	4	2	1 (Martin Earley)
Italy	15	8	2 (Valerio Tebaldi, Giovanni Fidanza)
Mexico	1	1	1 (Raúl Alcalá)
Netherlands	30	22	6 (Erik Breukink, Jelle Nijdam ×2, Mathieu Hermans, Steven Rooks, Gert-Jan Theunisse)
New Zealand	1	0	
Norway	3	1	
Portugal	1	1	1 (Acácio da Silva)
Spain	19	13	1 (Miguel Induráin)
Switzerland	10	7	1 (Pascal Richard)
Great Britain	2	2	1 (Robert Millar)
United States	5	3	3 (Greg LeMond ×3)
Yugoslavia	2	2	
West Germany	2	1	
Total	198	138	21 (Note: The team time trial on stage 2, won by Super U, is not counted in this total.)
