= 1989 Tour de France, Stage 11 to Stage 21 =

Cycling results

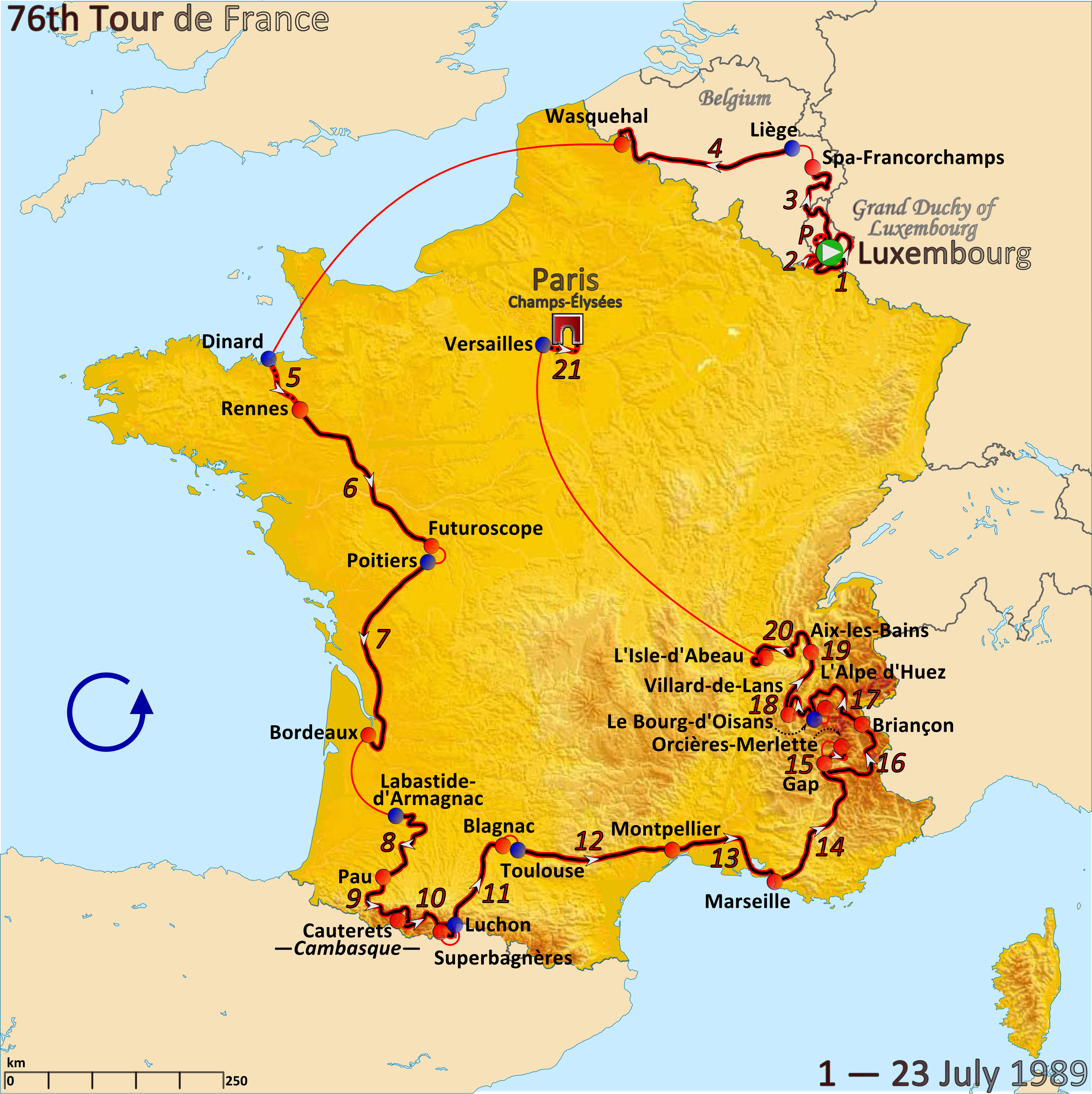
Route of the 1989 Tour de France

The 1989 Tour de France was the 76th edition of Tour de France, one of cycling's Grand Tours. The Tour began in Luxembourg with a prologue individual time trial on 1 July and Stage 10 occurred on 11 July with a mountain stage to Superbagnères. The race finished on the Champs-Élysées in Paris on 23 July, with a further individual time trial.

== Stage 11 ==
12 July 1989 — Luchon to Blagnac, 154.5 km (96.0 mi)

Stage 11 result

| Rank | Rider | Team | Time |
|---|---|---|---|
| 1 | Mathieu Hermans (NED) | Paternina–Marcos Eguizabal | 3h 37' 47" |
| 2 | Giovanni Fidanza (ITA) | Chateau d'Ax | s.t. |
| 3 | Eddy Planckaert (BEL) | ADR–Agrigel–Bottechia | s.t. |
| 4 | Teun van Vliet (NED) | Panasonic–Isostar | s.t. |
| 5 | Sean Kelly (IRL) | PDM | s.t. |
| 6 | Ronny Van Holen (BEL) | ADR–Agrigel–Bottechia | s.t. |
| 7 | Steve Bauer (CAN) | Helvetia–La Suisse | s.t. |
| 8 | Alfred Achermann (SUI) | Domex–Weinmann | s.t. |
| 9 | Jesper Skibby (DEN) | TVM | s.t. |
| 10 | Marc Sergeant (BEL) | Hitachi-VTM | s.t. |

General classification after stage 11

| Rank | Rider | Team | Time |
|---|---|---|---|
| 1 | Laurent Fignon (FRA) | Super U | 49h 49' 36" |
| 2 | Greg LeMond (USA) | ADR–Agrigel–Bottechia | + 7" |
| 3 | Charly Mottet (FRA) | RMO–Mavic–Liberia | + 57" |
| 4 | Pedro Delgado (ESP) | Reynolds–Banesto | + 2' 53" |
| 5 | Andrew Hampsten (USA) | 7 Eleven-American Airlines | + 5' 18" |
| 6 | Marino Lejarreta (ESP) | Paternina–Marcos Eguizabal | + 5' 51" |
| 7 | Gianni Bugno (ITA) | Chateau d'Ax | + 6' 3" |
| 8 | Robert Millar (GBR) | Z–Peugeot | + 6' 42" |
| 9 | Raúl Alcalá (MEX) | PDM | + 6' 46" |
| 10 | Steven Rooks (NED) | PDM | + 6' 59" |

== Stage 12 ==
13 July 1989 — Toulouse to Montpellier, 242 km (150 mi)

Stage 12 result

| Rank | Rider | Team | Time |
|---|---|---|---|
| 1 | Valerio Tebaldi (ITA) | Chateau d'Ax | 5h 40' 54" |
| 2 | Giancarlo Perini (ITA) | Carrera Jeans–Vagabond | s.t. |
| 3 | Dominique Arnaud (FRA) | Reynolds–Banesto | 2' 9" |
| 4 | Thomas Wegmüller (SUI) | Domex–Weinmann | 21' 24" |
| 5 | Jan Goessens (BEL) | Domex–Weinmann | 21' 40" |
| 6 | Frans Maassen (NED) | SuperConfex–Yoko–Opel | s.t. |
| 7 | Eddy Schurer (NED) | TVM | s.t. |
| 8 | Philippe Louviot (FRA) | Z–Peugeot | s.t. |
| 9 | Rik Van Slycke (BEL) | Histor Sigma–Fina | s.t. |
| 10 | François Lemarchand (FRA) | Z–Peugeot | s.t. |

General classification after stage 12

| Rank | Rider | Team | Time |
|---|---|---|---|
| 1 | Laurent Fignon (FRA) | Super U | 55h 52' 15" |
| 2 | Greg LeMond (USA) | ADR–Agrigel–Bottechia | + 7" |
| 3 | Charly Mottet (FRA) | RMO–Mavic–Liberia | + 57" |
| 4 | Pedro Delgado (ESP) | Reynolds–Banesto | + 2' 53" |
| 5 | Andrew Hampsten (USA) | 7 Eleven-American Airlines | + 5' 18" |
| 6 | Marino Lejarreta (ESP) | Paternina–Marcos Eguizabal | + 5' 51" |
| 7 | Gianni Bugno (ITA) | Chateau d'Ax | + 6' 3" |
| 8 | Robert Millar (GBR) | Z–Peugeot | + 6' 42" |
| 9 | Raúl Alcalá (MEX) | PDM | + 6' 46" |
| 10 | Steven Rooks (NED) | PDM | + 6' 59" |

== Stage 13 ==
14 July 1989 — Montpellier to Marseille, 179 km (111 mi)

Stage 13 result

| Rank | Rider | Team | Time |
|---|---|---|---|
| 1 | Vincent Barteau (FRA) | Super U | 4h 17' 31" |
| 2 | Jean-Claude Colotti (FRA) | RMO–Mavic–Liberia | + 45" |
| 3 | Martial Gayant (FRA) | Toshiba | + 1' 16" |
| 4 | Steve Bauer (CAN) | Helvetia–La Suisse | + 1' 21" |
| 5 | Etienne De Wilde (BEL) | Histor Sigma–Fina | + 1' 25" |
| 6 | Sean Kelly (IRL) | PDM | s.t. |
| 7 | Per Pedersen (DEN) | RMO–Mavic–Liberia | s.t. |
| 8 | Andreas Kappes (GER) | Toshiba | s.t. |
| 9 | Alfred Achermann (SUI) | Domex–Weinmann | s.t. |
| 10 | Laudelino Cubino (ESP) | BH | s.t. |

General classification after stage 13

| Rank | Rider | Team | Time |
|---|---|---|---|
| 1 | Laurent Fignon (FRA) | Super U | 60h 11' 11" |
| 2 | Greg LeMond (USA) | ADR–Agrigel–Bottechia | + 7" |
| 3 | Charly Mottet (FRA) | RMO–Mavic–Liberia | + 57" |
| 4 | Pedro Delgado (ESP) | Reynolds–Banesto | + 2' 53" |
| 5 | Andrew Hampsten (USA) | 7 Eleven-American Airlines | + 5' 18" |
| 6 | Marino Lejarreta (ESP) | Paternina–Marcos Eguizabal | + 5' 51" |
| 7 | Gianni Bugno (ITA) | Chateau d'Ax | + 6' 03" |
| 8 | Robert Millar (GBR) | Z–Peugeot | + 6' 42" |
| 9 | Raúl Alcalá (MEX) | PDM | + 6' 46" |
| 10 | Steven Rooks (NED) | PDM | + 6' 59" |

== Stage 14 ==
15 July 1989 — Marseille to Gap, 238 km (148 mi)

Stage 14 result

| Rank | Rider | Team | Time |
|---|---|---|---|
| 1 | Jelle Nijdam (NED) | SuperConfex–Yoko–Opel | 6h 27' 55" |
| 2 | Pascal Poisson (FRA) | Toshiba | + 2" |
| 3 | Eddy Planckaert (BEL) | ADR–Agrigel–Bottechia | s.t. |
| 4 | Giovanni Fidanza (ITA) | Chateau d'Ax | s.t. |
| 5 | Sean Kelly (IRL) | PDM | s.t. |
| 6 | Etienne De Wilde (BEL) | Histor Sigma–Fina | s.t. |
| 7 | Phil Anderson (AUS) | TVM | s.t. |
| 8 | Steven Rooks (NED) | PDM | s.t. |
| 9 | Rudy Dhaenens (BEL) | PDM | s.t. |
| 10 | Per Pedersen (DEN) | RMO–Mavic–Liberia | s.t. |

General classification after stage 14

| Rank | Rider | Team | Time |
|---|---|---|---|
| 1 | Laurent Fignon (FRA) | Super U | 66h 39' 08" |
| 2 | Greg LeMond (USA) | ADR–Agrigel–Bottechia | + 7" |
| 3 | Charly Mottet (FRA) | RMO–Mavic–Liberia | + 57" |
| 4 | Pedro Delgado (ESP) | Reynolds–Banesto | + 3' 03" |
| 5 | Andrew Hampsten (USA) | 7 Eleven-American Airlines | + 5' 18" |
| 6 | Marino Lejarreta (ESP) | Paternina–Marcos Eguizabal | + 5' 51" |
| 7 | Gianni Bugno (ITA) | Chateau d'Ax | + 6' 03" |
| 8 | Robert Millar (GBR) | Z–Peugeot | + 6' 42" |
| 9 | Raúl Alcalá (MEX) | PDM | + 6' 56" |
| 10 | Gert-Jan Theunisse (NED) | PDM | + 7' 06" |

== Stage 15 ==
16 July 1989 — Gap to Orcières-Merlette, 39 km (24 mi) (ITT)

Stage 15 result

| Rank | Rider | Team | Time |
|---|---|---|---|
| 1 | Steven Rooks (NED) | PDM | 1h 10' 42" |
| 2 | Marino Lejarreta (ESP) | Paternina–Marcos Eguizabal | + 24" |
| 3 | Miguel Induráin (ESP) | Reynolds–Banesto | + 43" |
| 4 | Pedro Delgado (ESP) | Reynolds–Banesto | + 49" |
| 5 | Greg LeMond (USA) | ADR–Agrigel–Bottechia | + 57" |
| 6 | Sean Kelly (IRL) | PDM | + 1' 06" |
| 7 | Raúl Alcalá (MEX) | PDM | + 1' 10" |
| 8 | Gert-Jan Theunisse (NED) | PDM | + 1' 12" |
| 9 | Laurent Biondi (FRA) | Fagor | + 1' 37" |
| 10 | Laurent Fignon (FRA) | Super U | + 1' 44" |

General classification after stage 15

| Rank | Rider | Team | Time |
|---|---|---|---|
| 1 | Greg LeMond (USA) | ADR–Agrigel–Bottechia | 67h 50' 54" |
| 2 | Laurent Fignon (FRA) | Super U | + 40" |
| 3 | Charly Mottet (FRA) | RMO–Mavic–Liberia | + 2' 17" |
| 4 | Pedro Delgado (ESP) | Reynolds–Banesto | + 2' 48" |
| 5 | Marino Lejarreta (ESP) | Paternina–Marcos Eguizabal | + 5' 11" |
| 6 | Steven Rooks (NED) | PDM | + 6' 05" |
| 7 | Andrew Hampsten (USA) | 7 Eleven-American Airlines | + 7' 02" |
| 8 | Raúl Alcalá (MEX) | PDM | s.t. |
| 9 | Gert-Jan Theunisse (NED) | PDM | + 7' 14" |
| 10 | Sean Kelly (IRL) | PDM | + 7' 15" |

== Stage 16 ==
18 July 1989 — Gap to Briançon, 174 km (108 mi)

Stage 16 result

| Rank | Rider | Team | Time |
|---|---|---|---|
| 1 | Pascal Richard (SUI) | Helvetia–La Suisse | 4h 46' 45" |
| 2 | Bruno Cornillet (FRA) | Z–Peugeot | + 2' 34" |
| 3 | Charly Mottet (FRA) | RMO–Mavic–Liberia | + 4' 50" |
| 4 | Greg LeMond (USA) | ADR–Agrigel–Bottechia | + 4' 51" |
| 5 | Martial Gayant (FRA) | Toshiba | s.t. |
| 6 | Pedro Delgado (ESP) | Reynolds–Banesto | s.t. |
| 7 | Gert-Jan Theunisse (NED) | PDM | s.t. |
| 8 | Steven Rooks (NED) | PDM | s.t. |
| 9 | Laurent Fignon (FRA) | Super U | + 5' 04" |
| 10 | Raúl Alcalá (MEX) | PDM | + 5' 26" |

General classification after stage 16

| Rank | Rider | Team | Time |
|---|---|---|---|
| 1 | Greg LeMond (USA) | ADR–Agrigel–Bottechia | 72h 42' 30" |
| 2 | Laurent Fignon (FRA) | Super U | + 53" |
| 3 | Charly Mottet (FRA) | RMO–Mavic–Liberia | + 2' 16" |
| 4 | Pedro Delgado (ESP) | Reynolds–Banesto | + 2' 48" |
| 5 | Steven Rooks (NED) | PDM | + 6' 05" |
| 6 | Gert-Jan Theunisse (NED) | PDM | + 7' 14" |
| 7 | Marino Lejarreta (ESP) | Paternina–Marcos Eguizabal | + 7' 28" |
| 8 | Raúl Alcalá (MEX) | PDM | + 7' 37" |
| 9 | Miguel Induráin (ESP) | Reynolds–Banesto | + 8' 25" |
| 10 | Andrew Hampsten (USA) | 7 Eleven-American Airlines | + 9' 35" |

== Stage 17 ==
19 July 1989 — Briançon to Alpe d'Huez, 161.5 km (100.4 mi)

Stage 17 result

| Rank | Rider | Team | Time |
|---|---|---|---|
| 1 | Gert-Jan Theunisse (NED) | PDM | 5h 10' 39" |
| 2 | Pedro Delgado (ESP) | Reynolds–Banesto | + 1' 09" |
| 3 | Laurent Fignon (FRA) | Super U | s.t. |
| 4 | Abelardo Rondón (COL) | Reynolds–Banesto | + 2' 08" |
| 5 | Greg LeMond (USA) | ADR–Agrigel–Bottechia | + 2' 28" |
| 6 | Marino Lejarreta (ESP) | Paternina–Marcos Eguizabal | + 2' 41" |
| 7 | Steven Rooks (NED) | PDM | + 3' 04" |
| 8 | Gianni Bugno (ITA) | Chateau d'Ax | s.t. |
| 9 | Robert Millar (GBR) | Z–Peugeot | + 3' 08" |
| 10 | Pascal Simon (FRA) | Super U | + 3' 48" |

General classification after stage 17

| Rank | Rider | Team | Time |
|---|---|---|---|
| 1 | Laurent Fignon (FRA) | Super U | 77h 55' 11" |
| 2 | Greg LeMond (USA) | ADR–Agrigel–Bottechia | + 26" |
| 3 | Pedro Delgado (ESP) | Reynolds–Banesto | + 1' 55" |
| 4 | Gert-Jan Theunisse (NED) | PDM | + 5' 12" |
| 5 | Charly Mottet (FRA) | RMO–Mavic–Liberia | + 5' 22" |
| 6 | Steven Rooks (NED) | PDM | + 7' 07" |
| 7 | Marino Lejarreta (ESP) | Paternina–Marcos Eguizabal | + 8' 07" |
| 8 | Raúl Alcalá (MEX) | PDM | + 10' 43" |
| 9 | Robert Millar (GBR) | Z–Peugeot | + 11' 49" |
| 10 | Sean Kelly (IRL) | PDM | + 14' 09" |

== Stage 18 ==
20 July 1989 — Le Bourg-d'Oisans to Villard-de-Lans, 91.5 km (56.9 mi)

Stage 18 result

| Rank | Rider | Team | Time |
|---|---|---|---|
| 1 | Laurent Fignon (FRA) | Super U | 2h 31' 28" |
| 2 | Steven Rooks (NED) | PDM | + 24" |
| 3 | Gert-Jan Theunisse (NED) | PDM | s.t. |
| 4 | Marino Lejarreta (ESP) | Paternina–Marcos Eguizabal | s.t. |
| 5 | Sean Kelly (IRL) | PDM | s.t. |
| 6 | Greg LeMond (USA) | ADR–Agrigel–Bottechia | s.t. |
| 7 | Pedro Delgado (ESP) | Reynolds–Banesto | + 33" |
| 8 | Alberto Camargo (COL) | Café de Colombia | + 36" |
| 9 | Raúl Alcalá (MEX) | PDM | s.t. |
| 10 | Luis Herrera (COL) | Café de Colombia | + 47" |

General classification after stage 18

| Rank | Rider | Team | Time |
|---|---|---|---|
| 1 | Laurent Fignon (FRA) | Super U | 80h 26' 39" |
| 2 | Greg LeMond (USA) | ADR–Agrigel–Bottechia | + 50" |
| 3 | Pedro Delgado (ESP) | Reynolds–Banesto | + 2' 28" |
| 4 | Gert-Jan Theunisse (NED) | PDM | + 5' 30" |
| 5 | Charly Mottet (FRA) | RMO–Mavic–Liberia | + 7' 29" |
| 6 | Steven Rooks (NED) | PDM | + 7' 31" |
| 7 | Marino Lejarreta (ESP) | Paternina–Marcos Eguizabal | + 8' 31" |
| 8 | Raúl Alcalá (MEX) | PDM | + 11' 19" |
| 9 | Robert Millar (GBR) | Z–Peugeot | + 14' 20" |
| 10 | Sean Kelly (IRL) | PDM | + 14' 33" |

== Stage 19 ==
21 July 1989 — Villard-de-Lans to Aix-les-Bains, 125 km (78 mi)

Stage 19 result

| Rank | Rider | Team | Time |
|---|---|---|---|
| 1 | Greg LeMond (USA) | ADR–Agrigel–Bottechia | 3h 17' 53" |
| 2 | Laurent Fignon (FRA) | Super U | s.t. |
| 3 | Pedro Delgado (ESP) | Reynolds–Banesto | s.t. |
| 4 | Gert-Jan Theunisse (NED) | PDM | s.t. |
| 5 | Marino Lejarreta (ESP) | Paternina–Marcos Eguizabal | + 4" |
| 6 | Gianni Bugno (ITA) | Chateau d'Ax | + 2' 11" |
| 7 | Sean Kelly (IRL) | PDM | s.t. |
| 8 | Steve Bauer (CAN) | Helvetia–La Suisse | s.t. |
| 9 | Steven Rooks (NED) | PDM | s.t. |
| 10 | Dominique Arnaud (FRA) | Reynolds–Banesto | s.t. |

General classification after stage 19

| Rank | Rider | Team | Time |
|---|---|---|---|
| 1 | Laurent Fignon (FRA) | Super U | 83h 44' 32" |
| 2 | Greg LeMond (USA) | ADR–Agrigel–Bottechia | + 50" |
| 3 | Pedro Delgado (ESP) | Reynolds–Banesto | + 2' 28" |
| 4 | Gert-Jan Theunisse (NED) | PDM | + 5' 30" |
| 5 | Marino Lejarreta (ESP) | Paternina–Marcos Eguizabal | + 8' 35" |
| 6 | Charly Mottet (FRA) | RMO–Mavic–Liberia | + 9' 40" |
| 7 | Steven Rooks (NED) | PDM | + 9' 42" |
| 8 | Raúl Alcalá (MEX) | PDM | + 13' 30" |
| 9 | Robert Millar (GBR) | Z–Peugeot | + 16' 31" |
| 10 | Sean Kelly (IRL) | PDM | + 16' 44" |

== Stage 20 ==
22 July 1989 — Aix-les-Bains to L'Isle-d'Abeau, 127 km (79 mi)

Stage 20 result

| Rank | Rider | Team | Time |
|---|---|---|---|
| 1 | Giovanni Fidanza (ITA) | Chateau d'Ax | 3h 26' 16" |
| 2 | Jelle Nijdam (NED) | SuperConfex–Yoko–Opel | s.t. |
| 3 | Sean Kelly (IRL) | PDM | s.t. |
| 4 | Mathieu Hermans (NED) | Paternina–Marcos Eguizabal | s.t. |
| 5 | Carlo Bomans (BEL) | Domex–Weinmann | s.t. |
| 6 | Etienne De Wilde (BEL) | Histor Sigma–Fina | s.t. |
| 7 | Acácio da Silva (POR) | Carrera Jeans–Vagabond | s.t. |
| 8 | Andreas Kappes (GER) | Toshiba | s.t. |
| 9 | Bjarne Riis (DEN) | Super U | s.t. |
| 10 | Michael Wilson (AUS) | Helvetia–La Suisse | s.t. |

General classification after stage 20

| Rank | Rider | Team | Time |
|---|---|---|---|
| 1 | Laurent Fignon (FRA) | Super U | 87h 10' 48" |
| 2 | Greg LeMond (USA) | ADR–Agrigel–Bottechia | + 50" |
| 3 | Pedro Delgado (ESP) | Reynolds–Banesto | + 2' 28" |
| 4 | Gert-Jan Theunisse (NED) | PDM | + 5' 30" |
| 5 | Marino Lejarreta (ESP) | Paternina–Marcos Eguizabal | + 8' 35" |
| 6 | Charly Mottet (FRA) | RMO–Mavic–Liberia | + 9' 40" |
| 7 | Steven Rooks (NED) | PDM | + 9' 42" |
| 8 | Raúl Alcalá (MEX) | PDM | + 13' 30" |
| 9 | Robert Millar (GBR) | Z–Peugeot | + 16' 31" |
| 10 | Sean Kelly (IRL) | PDM | + 16' 44" |

== Stage 21 ==
23 July 1989 — Versailles to Paris Champs-Élysées, 24.5 km (15.2 mi) (ITT)

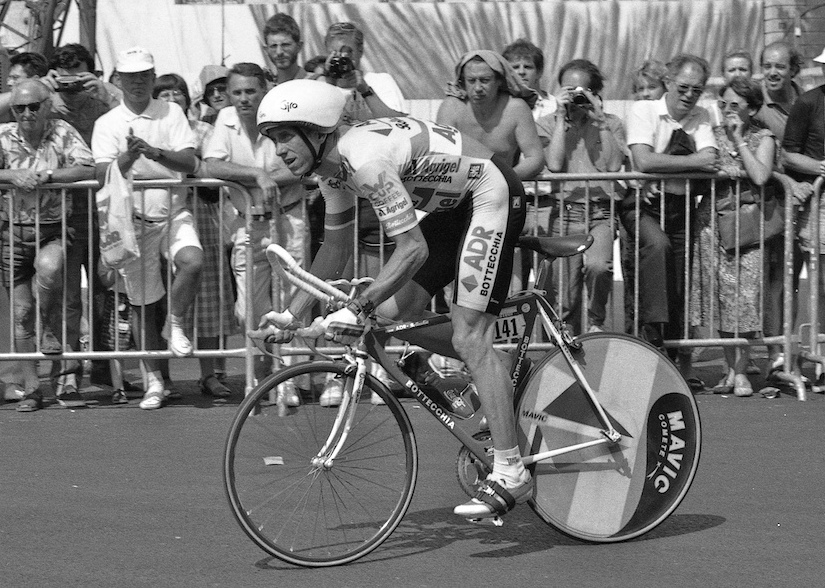
LeMond starting the final time trial

Departing from Versailles, the route passed through Chaville, Sèvres and Issy-les-Moulineaux, before the intermediate timecheck and then entering Paris and crossing to the Rive Droite. The route entered the Champs-Élysées via the Cours-la-Reine and the Place de la Concorde, heading up the south side of the Champs-Élysées and returning down the north side, just before the Arc de Triomphe.

The time trial was the first and, so far, only to have ever finished on the Champs-Élysées at the end of a Tour de France.

LeMond's time trial bike was set up with a 54-tooth chainring on the front and a 12-tooth gear as the fastest on the rear cogset, as well as the triathlon bars he had used in the Stage 5 and Stage 15 time trials, and a rear Mavic disc wheel. Meanwhile, Fignon rode with the same rear gear, but a 55-tooth front ring, no triathlon bars, and with front and rear disc wheels. LeMond used an aerodynamic helmet, whilst Fignon rode without a helmet and wore a long ponytail. Fignon also had a saddle sore and had little sleep the night before.

With the weather hot, dry and still, LeMond departed from the starthouse in Versailles at 4:12 p.m. CEST, and Fignon two minutes later. LeMond requested that his support crew not provide him with his intermediate times, nor details of Fignon's progress, so that he could give total concentration to his own ride. By the 11.5 km (7.1 mi) timecheck, LeMond was 21 seconds up on Fignon, for the stage. LeMond averaged 54.545 km/h (33.893 mph) along the course, which was a Tour de France time trial record at the time.

Stage 21 result

| Rank | Rider | Team | Time |
|---|---|---|---|
| 1 | Greg LeMond (USA) | ADR–Agrigel–Bottechia | 26' 57" |
| 2 | Thierry Marie (FRA) | Super U | + 33" |
| 3 | Laurent Fignon (FRA) | Super U | + 58" |
| 4 | Jelle Nijdam (NED) | SuperConfex–Yoko–Opel | + 1' 07" |
| 5 | Sean Yates (GBR) | 7 Eleven-American Airlines | + 1' 10" |
| 6 | Erich Mächler (SUI) | Carrera Jeans–Vagabond | s.t. |
| 7 | Helmut Wechselberger (AUT) | Paternina–Marcos Eguizabal | + 1' 11" |
| 8 | Charly Mottet (FRA) | RMO–Mavic–Liberia | + 1' 16" |
| 9 | René Beuker (NED) | Paternina–Marcos Eguizabal | + 1' 19" |
| 10 | Jesper Skibby (DEN) | TVM | + 1' 22" |

General classification after stage 21

| Rank | Rider | Team | Time |
|---|---|---|---|
| 1 | Greg LeMond (USA) | ADR–Agrigel–Bottechia | 87h 38' 35" |
| 2 | Laurent Fignon (FRA) | Super U | + 8" |
| 3 | Pedro Delgado (ESP) | Reynolds–Banesto | + 3' 34" |
| 4 | Gert-Jan Theunisse (NED) | PDM | + 7' 30" |
| 5 | Marino Lejarreta (ESP) | Paternina–Marcos Eguizabal | + 9' 39" |
| 6 | Charly Mottet (FRA) | RMO–Mavic–Liberia | + 10' 06" |
| 7 | Steven Rooks (NED) | PDM | + 11' 10" |
| 8 | Raúl Alcalá (MEX) | PDM | + 14' 21" |
| 9 | Sean Kelly (IRL) | PDM | + 18' 25" |
| 10 | Robert Millar (GBR) | Z–Peugeot | + 18' 46" |
