= 1989 Tour de France, Prologue to Stage 10 =

Cycling results

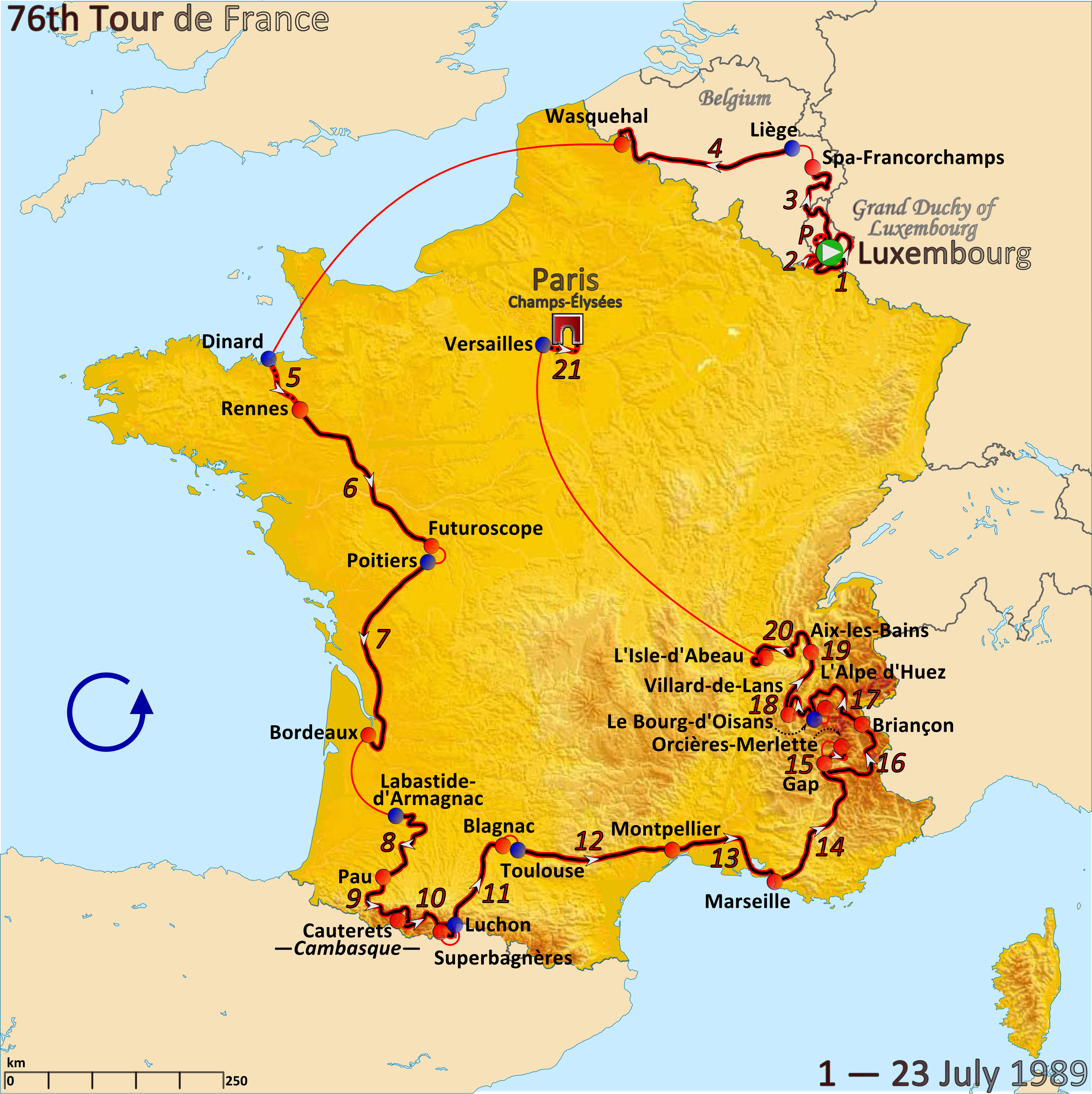
Route of the 1989 Tour de France

The 1989 Tour de France was the 76th edition of Tour de France, one of cycling's Grand Tours. The Tour began in Luxembourg with a prologue individual time trial on 1 July and Stage 10 occurred on 11 July with a mountain stage to Superbagnères. The race finished on the Champs-Élysées in Paris on 23 July, with a further individual time trial.

== Prologue ==
1 July 1989 — Luxembourg, 7.8 km (4.8 mi) (individual time trial)

Pedro Delgado, the previous year's winner and one of the pre-race favourites to win the Tour, missed the start of the prologue by 2 minutes 40 seconds. This resulted in him finishing last on the stage, 2 minutes 54 seconds behind the yellow jersey.

Prologue result and general classification after prologue

Rank	Rider	Team	Time
1	Erik Breukink (NED)	Panasonic–Isostar	09' 54"
2	Laurent Fignon (FRA)	Super U	+ 6"
3	Sean Kelly (IRL)	PDM	+ 6"
4	Greg LeMond (USA)	ADR–Agrigel–Bottechia	+ 6"
5	Steve Bauer (CAN)	Helvetia–La Suisse	+ 8"
6	Charly Mottet (FRA)	RMO–Mavic–Liberia	+ 9"
7	Miguel Induráin (ESP)	Reynolds–Banesto	+ 10"
8	Joël Pelier (FRA)	BH	+ 10"
9	Peter Stevenhaagen (NED)	Helvetia–La Suisse	+ 10"
10	Jörg Müller (SUI)	PDM	+ 10"

== Stage 1 ==
2 July 1989 — Luxembourg to Luxembourg, 135.5 km (84.2 mi)

Søren Lilholt attacked from the start of the stage. Lilholt gained 52 seconds on Acácio da Silva and Roland Le Clerc, and 6 minutes 50 seconds over the peloton by the first intermediate sprint at 45 km (28 mi). The three leading riders then grouped together and extended their lead over the peloton to 11 minutes 30 seconds, before being partially drawn back. Da Silva attacked the other breakaway riders at the 132 km (82 mi) mark and held the lead to the finish line.

Stage 1 result

Rank	Rider	Team	Time
1	Acácio da Silva (POR)	Carrera Jeans–Vagabond	3h 21' 36"
2	Søren Lilholt (DEN)	Histor Sigma-–Fina	+ 8"
3	Roland Le Clerc (FRA)	Paternina–Marcos Eguizabal	+ 1' 41"
4	Etienne De Wilde (BEL)	Histor Sigma-–Fina	+ 4' 40"
5	Sean Kelly (IRL)	PDM	+ 4' 40"
6	Giovanni Fidanza (ITA)	Chateau d'Ax	+ 4' 40"
7	Phil Anderson (AUS)	TVM	+ 4' 40"
8	Jean-Paul van Poppel (NED)	Panasonic–Isostar	+ 4' 40"
9	Fabrice Philipot (FRA)	Toshiba	+ 4' 40"
10	Adri van der Poel (NED)	Domex–Weinmann	+ 4' 40"

General classification after stage 1

Rank	Rider	Team	Time
1	Acácio da Silva (POR)	Carrera Jeans–Vagabond	3h 31' 44"
2	Søren Lilholt (DEN)	Histor Sigma-–Fina	+ 13"
3	Roland Le Clerc (FRA)	Paternina–Marcos Eguizabal	+ 1' 54"
4	Erik Breukink (NED)	Panasonic–Isostar	+ 4' 26"
5	Laurent Fignon (FRA)	Super U	+ 4' 32"
6	Sean Kelly (IRL)	PDM	+ 4' 32"
7	Greg LeMond (USA)	ADR–Agrigel–Bottechia	+ 4' 32"
8	Steve Bauer (CAN)	Helvetia–La Suisse	+ 4' 34"
9	Charly Mottet (FRA)	RMO–Mavic–Liberia	+ 4' 35"
10	Miguel Induráin (ESP)	Reynolds–Banesto	+ 4' 36"

== Stage 2 ==
2 July 1989 — Luxembourg to Luxembourg, 46 km (28.6 mi) (team time trial)

Stage 2 result

Rank	Team	Time
1	Super U	53' 48"
2	Panasonic–Isostar	+ 32"
3	SuperConfex–Yoko–Opel	+ 50"
4	PDM	+ 50"
5	ADR–Agrigel–Bottechia	+ 51"
6	7 Eleven-American Airlines	+ 56"
7	RMO–Mavic–Liberia	+ 1' 14"
8	Z–Peugeot	+ 1' 15"
9	TVM	+ 1' 18"
10	Helvetia–La Suisse	+ 1' 46"

General classification after stage 2

Rank	Rider	Team	Time
1	Acácio da Silva (POR)	Carrera Jeans–Vagabond	4h 27' 27"
2	Søren Lilholt (DEN)	Histor Sigma-–Fina	+ 26"
3	Laurent Fignon (FRA)	Super U	+ 2' 37"
4	Thierry Marie (FRA)	Super U	+ 2' 41"
5	Pascal Simon (FRA)	Super U	+ 2' 48"
6	Gérard Rué (FRA)	Super U	+ 3'
7	Heinz Imboden (SUI)	Super U	+ 3' 2"
8	Vincent Barteau (FRA)	Super U	+ 3' 2"
9	Erik Breukink (NED)	Panasonic–Isostar	+ 3' 3"
10	Christophe Lavainne (FRA)	Super U	+ 3' 8"

== Stage 3 ==
3 July 1989 — Luxembourg to Spa, 241 km (149.8 mi)

This stage contained one Category 3 and one Category 4 climb, and finished on the Circuit de Spa-Francorchamps.

Stage 3 result

Rank	Rider	Team	Time
1	Raúl Alcalá (MEX)	PDM	6h 34' 17"
2	Jesper Skibby (DEN)	TVM	+ 5"
3	Patrick Tolhoek (NED)	SuperConfex–Yoko–Opel	+ 5"
4	Thierry Marie (FRA)	Super U	+ 6"
5	Marc Madiot (FRA)	Toshiba	+ 6"
6	Rik Van Slycke (BEL)	Histor Sigma-–Fina	+ 33"
7	Frédéric Vichot (FRA)	Helvetia–La Suisse	+ 50"
8	Sean Kelly (IRL)	PDM	+ 50"
9	Etienne De Wilde (BEL)	Histor Sigma-–Fina	+ 50"
10	Marc Sergeant (BEL)	Hitachi-VTM	+ 50"

General classification after stage 3

Rank	Rider	Team	Time
1	Acácio da Silva (POR)	Carrera Jeans–Vagabond	11h 2' 34"
2	Søren Lilholt (DEN)	Histor Sigma-–Fina	+ 24"
3	Thierry Marie (FRA)	Super U	+ 1' 57"
4	Laurent Fignon (FRA)	Super U	+ 2' 37"
5	Pascal Simon (FRA)	Super U	+ 2' 48"
6	Raúl Alcalá (MEX)	PDM	+ 2' 52"
7	Gérard Rué (FRA)	Super U	+ 3'
8	Erik Breukink (NED)	Panasonic–Isostar	+ 3' 3"
9	Christophe Lavainne (FRA)	Super U	+ 3' 8"
10	Jesper Skibby (DEN)	TVM	+ 3' 18"

== Stage 4 ==
4 July 1989 — Liège to Wasquehal, 255 km (158.4 mi)

Stage 4 result

Rank	Rider	Team	Time
1	Jelle Nijdam (NED)	SuperConfex–Yoko–Opel	6h 13' 58"
2	Jesper Skibby (DEN)	TVM	+ 3"
3	Johan Museeuw (BEL)	ADR–Agrigel–Bottechia	+ 3"
4	Jérôme Simon (FRA)	Z–Peugeot	+ 3"
5	Søren Lilholt (DEN)	Histor Sigma-–Fina	+ 3"
6	Miguel Induráin (ESP)	Reynolds–Banesto	+ 5"
7	Jos Lieckens (BEL)	Hitachi-VTM	+ 5"
8	Giovanni Fidanza (ITA)	Chateau d'Ax	+ 5"
9	Peter Pieters (NED)	TVM	+ 5"
10	Sean Kelly (IRL)	PDM	+ 5"

General classification after stage 4

Rank	Rider	Team	Time
1	Acácio da Silva (POR)	Carrera Jeans–Vagabond	17h 16' 37"
2	Søren Lilholt (DEN)	Histor Sigma-–Fina	+ 14"
3	Thierry Marie (FRA)	Super U	+ 1' 57"
4	Laurent Fignon (FRA)	Super U	+ 2' 37"
5	Pascal Simon (FRA)	Super U	+ 2' 48"
6	Raúl Alcalá (MEX)	PDM	+ 2' 52"
7	Gérard Rué (FRA)	Super U	+ 3'
8	Erik Breukink (NED)	Panasonic–Isostar	+ 3' 3"
9	Christophe Lavainne (FRA)	Super U	+ 3' 8"
10	Jesper Skibby (DEN)	TVM	+ 3' 16"

== Stage 5 ==
6 July 1989 — Dinard to Rennes, 73 km (45.4 mi) (individual time trial)

This stage departed from Dinard, heading south through Dinan, to Rennes.

Greg LeMond, Sean Yates and Andy Hampsten opted to use triathlon bars, a then-recent introduction, in addition to the bullhorn bars usually fitted to time trial bikes.

Stage 5 result

Rank	Rider	Team	Time
1	Greg LeMond (USA)	ADR–Agrigel–Bottechia	1h 38' 12"
2	Pedro Delgado (ESP)	Reynolds–Banesto	+ 24"
3	Laurent Fignon (FRA)	Super U	+ 56"
4	Thierry Marie (FRA)	Super U	+ 1' 51"
5	Sean Yates (GBR)	7 Eleven-American Airlines	+ 2' 6"
6	Erik Breukink (NED)	Panasonic–Isostar	+ 2' 16"
7	Marino Lejarreta (ESP)	Paternina–Marcos Eguizabal	+ 2' 20"
8	Steve Bauer (CAN)	Helvetia–La Suisse	+ 2' 50"
9	Gianni Bugno (ITA)	Chateau d'Ax	+ 2' 53"
10	Pascal Simon (FRA)	Super U	+ 3' 19"

General classification after stage 5

Rank	Rider	Team	Time
1	Greg LeMond (USA)	ADR–Agrigel–Bottechia	18h 58' 17"
2	Laurent Fignon (FRA)	Super U	+ 5"
3	Thierry Marie (FRA)	Super U	+ 20"
4	Erik Breukink (NED)	Panasonic–Isostar	+ 1' 51"
5	Sean Yates (GBR)	7 Eleven-American Airlines	+ 2' 18"
6	Pascal Simon (FRA)	Super U	+ 2' 39"
7	Acácio da Silva (POR)	Carrera Jeans–Vagabond	+ 3' 2"
8	Jesper Skibby (DEN)	TVM	+ 3' 24"
9	Steve Bauer (CAN)	Helvetia–La Suisse	+ 3' 47"
10	Charly Mottet (FRA)	RMO–Mavic–Liberia	+ 4' 9"

== Stage 6 ==
7 July 1989 — Rennes to Futuroscope, 259 km (160.9 mi)

The longest stage of the year's Tour, a flat stage, departed from Rennes heading east to Châteaugiron and then turned south to Janzé. The race headed south-east through Retiers and Martigné-Ferchaud to Pouancé. The riders continued east through Noyant-la-Gravoyère and Marans, and then south through La Pouëze and Saint-Augustin-des-Bois before the Category 4 climb of the Côte-des-4-Routes. The route continued south through Chanzeaux and Le Breuil-sous-Argenton. Turning east to Massais, the route continued to Thouars and turned south-east to Saint-Jouin-de-Marnes and then Jaunay-Clan, before the finish in Futuroscope.

Stage 6 result

Rank	Rider	Team	Time
1	Joël Pelier (FRA)	BH	6h 57' 45"
2	Eddy Schurer (NED)	TVM	+ 1' 34"
3	Eric Vanderaerden (BEL)	Panasonic–Isostar	+ 1' 36"
4	Adri van der Poel (NED)	Domex–Weinmann	+ 1' 36"
5	Rudy Dhaenens (BEL)	PDM	+ 1' 36"
6	Eddy Planckaert (BEL)	ADR–Agrigel–Bottechia	+ 1' 36"
7	Etienne De Wilde (BEL)	Histor Sigma-–Fina	+ 1' 36"
8	Marc Sergeant (BEL)	Hitachi-VTM	+ 1' 36"
9	Phil Anderson (AUS)	TVM	+ 1' 36"
10	Steven Rooks (NED)	PDM	+ 1' 36"

General classification after stage 6

Rank	Rider	Team	Time
1	Greg LeMond (USA)	ADR–Agrigel–Bottechia	25h 57' 38"
2	Laurent Fignon (FRA)	Super U	+ 5"
3	Thierry Marie (FRA)	Super U	+ 20"
4	Erik Breukink (NED)	Panasonic–Isostar	+ 1' 51"
5	Sean Yates (GBR)	7 Eleven-American Airlines	+ 2' 18"
6	Pascal Simon (FRA)	Super U	+ 2' 39"
7	Acácio da Silva (POR)	Carrera Jeans–Vagabond	+ 3' 2"
8	Jesper Skibby (DEN)	TVM	+ 3' 24"
9	Steve Bauer (CAN)	Helvetia–La Suisse	+ 3' 47"
10	Charly Mottet (FRA)	RMO–Mavic–Liberia	+ 4' 9"

== Stage 7 ==
8 July 1989 — Poitiers to Bordeaux, 258.5 km (160.6 mi)

Stage 7 result

Rank	Rider	Team	Time
1	Etienne De Wilde (BEL)	Histor Sigma-–Fina	7h 21' 57"
2	Jean-Claude Colotti (FRA)	RMO–Mavic–Liberia	+ 0"
3	Patrick Tolhoek (NED)	SuperConfex–Yoko–Opel	+ 2"
4	Steve Bauer (CAN)	Helvetia–La Suisse	+ 2"
5	Jean-Paul van Poppel (NED)	Panasonic–Isostar	+ 4"
6	Peter Pieters (NED)	TVM	+ 4"
7	Giovanni Fidanza (ITA)	Chateau d'Ax	+ 4"
8	Mathieu Hermans (NED)	Paternina–Marcos Eguizabal	+ 4"
9	Johan Museeuw (BEL)	ADR–Agrigel–Bottechia	+ 4"
10	Eddy Planckaert (BEL)	ADR–Agrigel–Bottechia	+ 4"

General classification after stage 7

Rank	Rider	Team	Time
1	Greg LeMond (USA)	ADR–Agrigel–Bottechia	33h 19' 39"
2	Laurent Fignon (FRA)	Super U	+ 5"
3	Thierry Marie (FRA)	Super U	+ 40"
4	Erik Breukink (NED)	Panasonic–Isostar	+ 1' 51"
5	Sean Yates (GBR)	7 Eleven-American Airlines	+ 2' 18"
6	Pascal Simon (FRA)	Super U	+ 2' 39"
7	Acácio da Silva (POR)	Carrera Jeans–Vagabond	+ 2' 56"
8	Jesper Skibby (DEN)	TVM	+ 3' 24"
9	Steve Bauer (CAN)	Helvetia–La Suisse	+ 3' 45"
10	Charly Mottet (FRA)	RMO–Mavic–Liberia	+ 4' 9"

== Stage 8 ==
9 July 1989 — Labastide-d'Armagnac to Pau, 157 km (97.6 mi)

Stage 8 result

Rank	Rider	Team	Time
1	Martin Earley (IRL)	PDM	3h 51' 26"
2	Éric Caritoux (FRA)	RMO–Mavic–Liberia	+ 4"
3	Michael Wilson (AUS)	Helvetia–La Suisse	+ 4"
4	Philippe Louviot (FRA)	Z–Peugeot	+ 6"
5	Laurent Bezault (FRA)	Toshiba	+ 8"
6	Valerio Tebaldi (ITA)	Chateau d'Ax	+ 8"
7	Steven Rooks (NED)	PDM	+ 18"
8	Sean Kelly (IRL)	PDM	+ 20"
9	Etienne De Wilde (BEL)	Histor Sigma-–Fina	+ 20"
10	Rudy Dhaenens (BEL)	PDM	+ 20"

General classification after stage 8

Rank	Rider	Team	Time
1	Greg LeMond (USA)	ADR–Agrigel–Bottechia	37h 11' 25"
2	Laurent Fignon (FRA)	Super U	+ 5"
3	Thierry Marie (FRA)	Super U	+ 40"
4	Erik Breukink (NED)	Panasonic–Isostar	+ 1' 51"
5	Sean Yates (GBR)	7 Eleven-American Airlines	+ 2' 18"
6	Pascal Simon (FRA)	Super U	+ 2' 39"
7	Acácio da Silva (POR)	Carrera Jeans–Vagabond	+ 2' 56"
8	Jesper Skibby (DEN)	TVM	+ 3' 24"
9	Steve Bauer (CAN)	Helvetia–La Suisse	+ 3' 45"
10	Charly Mottet (FRA)	RMO–Mavic–Liberia	+ 4' 9"

== Stage 9 ==
10 July 1989 — Pau to Cauterets, 147 km (91.3 mi)

The first mountain stage of the Tour departed south-west from Pau, through Lasseube to Oloron-Sainte-Marie. The riders then headed south through Gurmençon to Escot, to begin the climb east to the Category 1 Col de Marie-Blanque to 1,035 m (3,396 ft). The route then descended east to the valley floor at Bielle, before beginning a gentle climb south through Laruns and turning east to Eaux-Bonnes. The riders then began the Hors catégorie climb of the Col d'Aubisque to 1,710 m (5,610 ft), partially descending through the Col du Soulor, and then climbing the Category 2 Col des Bordères to 1,150 m (3,770 ft), before the final big descent to Argelès-Gazost. Heading south, the brief climb of the Category 4 Côte de Saint-Savin was followed by a quick descent to Pierrefitte-Nestalas. The race continued south, beginning the ascent of the Category 1 climb to Le Cambasque, west above Cauterets, at an altitude of 1,320 m (4,330 ft).

Stage 9 result

Rank	Rider	Team	Time
1	Miguel Induráin (ESP)	Reynolds–Banesto	4h 32' 36"
2	Anselmo Fuerte (ESP)	BH	+ 27"
3	Pedro Delgado (ESP)	Reynolds–Banesto	+ 1' 29"
4	Sean Kelly (IRL)	PDM	+ 1' 56"
5	Steven Rooks (NED)	PDM	+ 1' 56"
6	Gert-Jan Theunisse (NED)	PDM	+ 1' 56"
7	Laurent Fignon (FRA)	Super U	+ 1' 58"
8	Greg LeMond (USA)	ADR–Agrigel–Bottechia	+ 1' 58"
9	Luc Roosen (BEL)	Histor Sigma-–Fina	+ 1' 58"
10	Charly Mottet (FRA)	RMO–Mavic–Liberia	+ 1' 58"

General classification after stage 9

Rank	Rider	Team	Time
1	Greg LeMond (USA)	ADR–Agrigel–Bottechia	41h 45' 49"
2	Laurent Fignon (FRA)	Super U	+ 5"
3	Pascal Simon (FRA)	Super U	+ 3' 56"
4	Charly Mottet (FRA)	RMO–Mavic–Liberia	+ 4' 09"
5	Sean Kelly (IRL)	PDM	+ 4' 52"
6	Andrew Hampsten (USA)	7 Eleven-American Airlines	+ 5' 14"
7	Gianni Bugno (ITA)	Chateau d'Ax	+ 5' 24"
8	Miguel Induráin (ESP)	Reynolds–Banesto	+ 5' 37"
9	Steve Bauer (CAN)	Helvetia–La Suisse	+ 6' 01"
10	Marino Lejarreta (ESP)	Paternina–Marcos Eguizabal	+ 6' 08"

== Stage 10 ==
11 July 1989 — Cauterets to Superbagnères, 136 km (84.5 mi)

The mountainous stage departed from Cauterets heading north to Pierrefitte-Nestalas before turning back south to Luz-Saint-Sauveur. The race then turned east and began ascending to Barèges, on the lower slopes of the Hors catégorie Col du Tourmalet, before the full ascent to 2,115 m (6,939 ft). After descending north-east to Sainte-Marie-de-Campan, the riders began the climb of the Category 2 Col d'Aspin to 1,489 m (4,885 ft). Following a winding descent south-east to the valley at Arreau, the race continued on through Bordères-Louron for the Category 1 Col de Peyresourde to 1,569 m (5,148 ft). The race then descended east through Cazeaux-de-Larboust to the valley floor at Luchon. Finally, the riders turned south for the Category 1 climb to Superbagnères, with the finish line at 1,770 m (5,810 ft).

Stage 10 result

Rank	Rider	Team	Time
1	Robert Millar (GBR)	Z–Peugeot	4h 22' 19"
2	Pedro Delgado (ESP)	Reynolds–Banesto	s.t.
3	Charly Mottet (FRA)	RMO–Mavic–Liberia	+ 19"
4	Steven Rooks (NED)	PDM	+ 3' 4"
5	Gert-Jan Theunisse (NED)	PDM	+ 3' 4"
6	Marino Lejarreta (ESP)	Paternina–Marcos Eguizabal	+ 3' 14"
7	Laurent Fignon (FRA)	Super U	+ 3' 26"
8	Andrew Hampsten (USA)	7 Eleven-American Airlines	+ 3' 35"
9	Greg LeMond (USA)	ADR–Agrigel–Bottechia	+ 3' 38"
10	Raúl Alcalá (MEX)	PDM	+ 3' 42"

General classification after stage 10

Rank	Rider	Team	Time
1	Laurent Fignon (FRA)	Super U	46h 11' 49"
2	Greg LeMond (USA)	ADR–Agrigel–Bottechia	+ 7"
3	Charly Mottet (FRA)	RMO–Mavic–Liberia	+ 57"
4	Pedro Delgado (ESP)	Reynolds–Banesto	+ 2' 53"
5	Andrew Hampsten (USA)	7 Eleven-American Airlines	+ 5' 18"
6	Marino Lejarreta (ESP)	Paternina–Marcos Eguizabal	+ 5' 51"
7	Gianni Bugno (ITA)	Chateau d'Ax	+ 6' 3"
8	Robert Millar (GBR)	Z–Peugeot	+ 6' 42"
9	Raúl Alcalá (MEX)	PDM	+ 6' 46"
10	Steven Rooks (NED)	PDM	+ 6' 59"
