= Van Vooren =

Van Vooren is a surname. Notable people with the surname include:

- Filip Van Vooren (born 1962), Belgian racing cyclist
- Monique van Vooren (1927–2020), Belgian-American actress, singer, and writer
- Steven Van Vooren (born 1986), Belgian racing cyclist
