= 1988 Tour de Suisse =

Race details
- Dates: 14–23 June 1988
- Stages: 10
- Distance: 1,793 km (1,114 mi)
- Winning time: 44h 56' 24"

Results
	Winner	Helmut Wechselberger (AUT)	(Malvor–Bottecchia–Sidi)
	Second	Steve Bauer (CAN)	(Weinmann–La Suisse–SMM Uster)
	Third	Acácio da Silva (POR)	(Kas–Canal 10)

The 1988 Tour de Suisse was the 52nd edition of the Tour de Suisse cycle race and was held from 14 June to 23 June 1988. The race started in Dübendorf and finished in Zürich. The race was won by Helmut Wechselberger of the Malvor–Bottecchia team.

== General classification ==
Final general classification

Rank	Rider	Team	Time
1	Helmut Wechselberger (AUT)	Malvor–Bottecchia–Sidi	44h 56' 24"
2	Steve Bauer (CAN)	Weinmann–La Suisse–SMM Uster	+ 1' 25"
3	Acácio da Silva (POR)	Kas–Canal 10	+ 1' 44"
4	Rolf Järmann (SUI)	Cyndarella-Isotonic	+ 2' 33"
5	Patrick Robeet (BEL)	Lotto	+ 4' 09"
6	Francesco Cesarini (ITA)	Ariostea–Gres	+ 8' 40"
7	Mauro Gianetti (SUI)	Weinmann–La Suisse–SMM Uster	+ 9' 05"
8	Fabian Fuchs (SUI)	Cyndarella-Isotonic	+ 10' 19"
9	Eric Van Lancker (BEL)	Panasonic–Isostar–Colnago–Agu	+ 10' 42"
10	Niki Rüttimann (SUI)	Weinmann–La Suisse–SMM Uster	+ 11' 09"
