= Manuel Guijarro =

Manuel Guijarro may refer to:

- Manuel Guijarro Doménech, Spanish racing cyclist
- Manuel Guijarro (athlete), Spanish sprinter
