= Vincent Lavenu =

French road bicycle racer

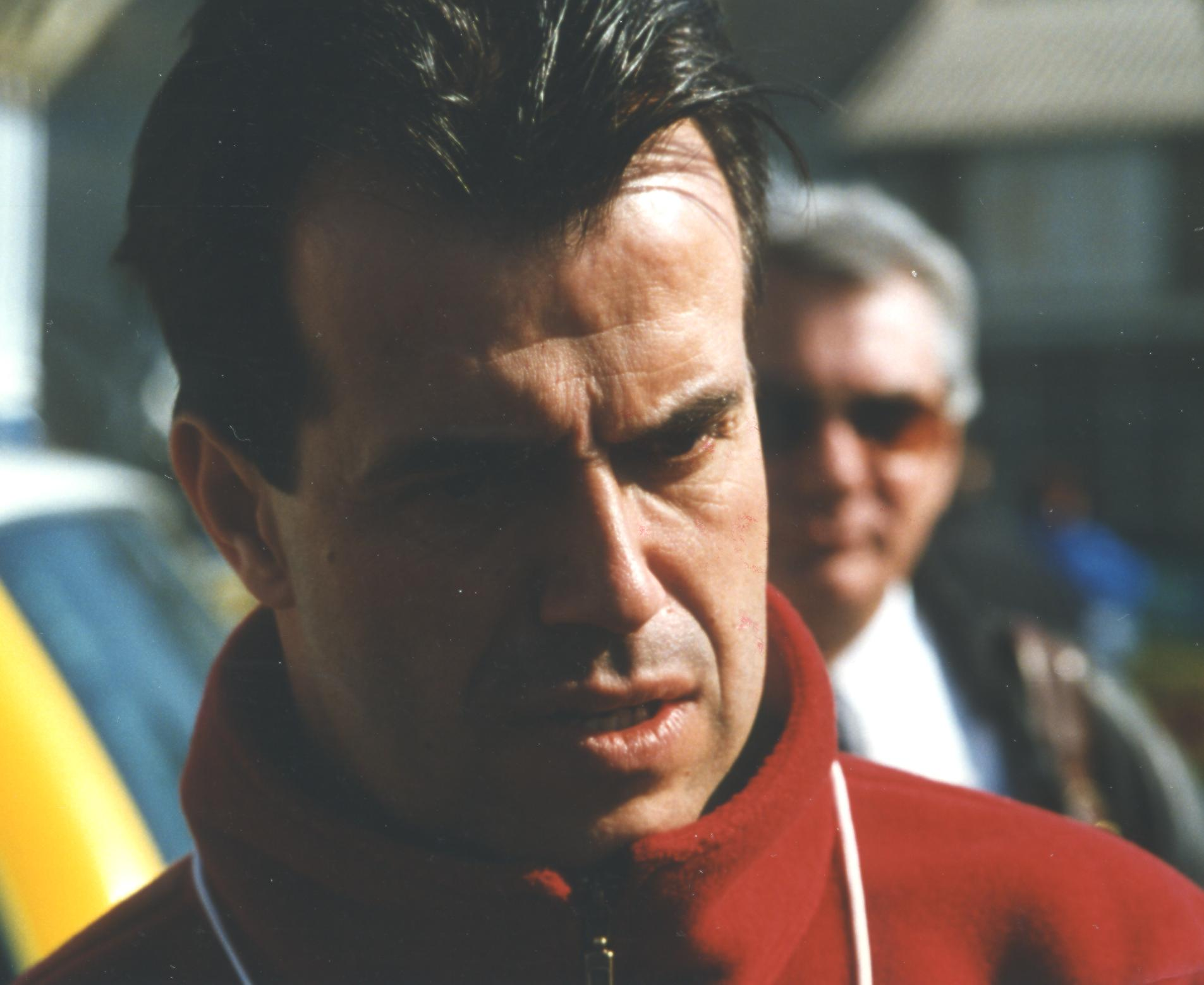

Personal information
- Born: January 12, 1956 (age 70) Briançon, France

Cycling career
- Sport: Cycling
- Discipline: Road
- Role: Rider

Vincent Lavenu (born 12 January 1956) is a French former professional road bicycle racer, from 1992 to 2024 he was the general manager of UCI WorldTeam Decathlon CMA CGM Team.

== Professional career ==
Born in Briançon, Hautes-Alpes, Lavenu had been competing as an amateur in France for the Parisian amateur team La-Motte-Servolex and had been in contact with Jean-Pierre Danguillaume of the COOP-Mercier team and Jean de Gribaldy of Skil Sem about becoming a professional, but it was not until the autumn of 1982 when Pierre Rivory and Michel Nédélec turned the elite amateur team Pélussin into a professional team that they contacted Lavenu with the offer of becoming professional. Lavenu was 27 years of age when he became professional with the Union cycliste Saint Étienne Pélussin team in 1983. As a first year professional, he crashed in the Dauphiné Liberé and spent 8 days in hospital after which he could only compete in several races at the end of the season. The Saint Etienne Pelussin team did not obtain the necessary sponsorship and left the professional peloton at the end of 1983. Lavenu found himself without a commercial team for the following two seasons but was able to continue competing in professional races by wearing the jersey of the cycling union of France, the Union Nationale des Cyclistes Professionnels. This was not a commercial team but a team organised by Marcel Tinazzi that enabled professionals without commercial contracts to continue racing in professional competition. Lavenu also raced track events such as six-day races. In 1986 he joined the Miko-Carlos team that fellow professional Jean-François Chaurin was setting up. The team also signed Régis Clère, Laurent Biondi and Franck Pineau. When the team was not selected for the 1986 Tour de France, the sponsors decided to pull out of the sport. In 1987 Lavenu joined the R.M.O. team when Bernard Thévenet was directeur sportif. Lavenu won the first race of the season with his new team, the Ronde pyrénéenne. He joined the Fagor team of Stephen Roche and directeur sportif Patrick Valcke in 1988 and 1989. He won a stage in the Tour of Portugal, finished fifth in 1988 Bordeaux–Paris, seventh in the 1989 French national road race championships, seventh in the 1989 Route du Sud. He rode the 1989 Tour de France where he finished in 65th place.

In 1990 he became an individually sponsored professional which enabled him to race in both professional and amateur events. He won stage 3b of the 1990 Route du Sud. In his final year as a professional he rode for a very small Swiss team Mosoca where he helped organize the co-sponsor of his team, Chazal, and this led the way for Lavenu to form a small professional team backed by Chazal the following year.

== Major results ==
- Route du Sud – 1 stage (1990)
- Volta a Portugal – 1 stage (1988)
- Bordeaux–Paris
  - 5th (1988)
  - 9th (1987)
- Ronde des Pyrénées-Méditerranée (1987)
- France Track Championships – Madison (1984)

== Career as Directeur Sportif and team manager ==
In 1992 he started a professional cycling team with Chazal as the main sponsor from 1992 to 1995. In 1996 Petit Casino, a chain of coffee shops in supermarkets took over the sponsorship of the team. At this time the team was a second division team that relied on the public to sponsor the team. The team used the slogan "Petit Casino- c’est votre equipe" – it’s your team which signified this involvement of the public. In 1997 Casino, the supermarket chain that hosted the Petit Casino coffee shops, took over the sponsorship of the team and the budget increased substantially. Lavenu’s team could compete in the big races such as the classics. The insurance company Ag2r Prevoyance took over as the main sponsor in 2000. When the UCI introduced the UCI ProTour in 2005, Ag2r Prévoyance did not initially obtain a ProTour licence but were granted one in 2006. He was fired from his director role and left the team in 2024.
