= Tour of Flanders U23 =

Belgian one-day road cycling race

Race details
- Date: Early April
- Region: Flanders, Belgium
- Local name: Ronde van Vlaanderen Beloften
- Discipline: Road
- Competition: UCI Europe Tour
- Type: One-day
- Web site: www.rondevanvlaanderen.be/nl/rvv/beloften-mannen

History
- First edition: 1936
- Editions: 74 (as of 2018)
- First winner: W.'t Jolijn (BEL)
- Most wins: Ludovic Capelle (BEL) (2 wins)
- Most recent: Andreas Stokbro (DEN)

Tour of Flanders U23 (Dutch: Ronde Van Vlaanderen Beloften) is a Flanders Classics road bicycle race. It is the version of the Tour of Flanders for under-23 riders and is usually contested a week after the men's event. Ludovic Capelle is the only rider who has been able to win this race twice. Since 2008 the race has been included on the Cup of Nations calendar, and it is restricted to national teams.

== Winners ==
Year	Country	Rider	Team
1936	Belgium	W.'t Jolijn	
1937	Belgium	Roger Dujardin	
1938	Belgium	André Declerck	
1939	Belgium	Albert Sercu	
1940– 1946	No race		
1947	Belgium	Florent Rondelé	
1948	Belgium	Roger Decock	
1949	Belgium	Valèra Mekeirel	
1950	Belgium	Joseph Lefèvre	
1951	Belgium	Aimé Deschacht	
1952	Belgium	Lucien Victor	
1953	Belgium	René Muylle	
1954	Netherlands	Wim Rusman	
1955	Belgium	Arthur Decabooter	
1956	Belgium	Gustaaf De Smet	
1957	Belgium	José Denoyette	
1958	Belgium	Georges Mortiers	
1959	Belgium	Constant Goossens	
1960	Belgium	Willy Vanden Berghen	
1961	Belgium	Ernest Dumez	
1962	Belgium	Edward Sels	
1963– 1964	No race		
1965	Belgium	Jozef Boons	
1966	Belgium	Gregoire Van Kuyck	
1967	Belgium	Valère Vansweevelt	
1968	Belgium	André Dierickx	
1969	Belgium	Rik Van Linden	
1970	Belgium	Marcel Sannen	
1971	Belgium	Marc Demeyer	
1972	Belgium	Yvan Benaets	
1973	Belgium	Marc Meernhout	
1974	Belgium	Marcel Van der Slagmolen	
1975	Belgium	Eddy Copmans	
1976	Belgium	Paul De Keyser	
1977	Belgium	Johnny De Nul	
1978	Belgium	Patrick Devos	
1979	Belgium	Luc Colijn	
1980	Belgium	Werner Devos	
1981	Belgium	Eric Vanderaerden	
1982	Belgium	Noël Segers	
1983	Belgium	Frank Verleyen	
1984	Belgium	Philippe Deleye	
1985	Belgium	Franky Pattyn	
1986	Belgium	Edwig Van Hooydonck	
1987	Belgium	Marc Assez	
1988	Belgium	Eddy Van Craeynest	
1989	Belgium	Peter Hoydonckx	
1990	Belgium	Wim Sels	
1991	Belgium	Nico Desmet	
1992	Belgium	Wim Omloop	
1993	Belgium	Mario Liboton	
1994	Belgium	Ludo Giesberts	
1995	Belgium	Johan De Geyter	
1996	Belgium	Ludovic Capelle	
1997	Belgium	Ludovic Capelle	
1998	Belgium	Jurgen Guns	
1999	Belgium	Kevin Hulsmans	
2000	Netherlands	Bobbie Traksel	Rabobank Beloften
2001	Belgium	Roy Sentjens	Rabobank Beloften
2002	Belgium	Nick Nuyens	Domo–Latexco Retie
2003	Belgium	Wim De Vocht	Quick-Step–Davitamon–Latexco
2004	Italy	Giovanni Visconti	Italy (national team)
2005	Belgium	Kenny Dehaes	Amuzza.com–Davo
2006	Belgium	Kevyn Ista	VC Roubaix
2007	Moldova	Alexandre Pliușchin	Chambéry Cyclisme Formation
2008	Latvia	Gatis Smukulis	Latvia (national team)
2009	Belgium	Jan Ghyselinck	Belgium (national team)
2010	Slovenia	Marko Kump	Slovenia (national team)
2011	Italy	Salvatore Puccio	Italy (national team)
2012	Belgium	Kenneth Vanbilsen	Belgium (national team)
2013	Germany	Rick Zabel	Germany (national team)
2014	Netherlands	Dylan Groenewegen	Netherlands (national team)
2015	Australia	Alex Edmondson	Australia (national team)
2016	Slovenia	David Per	Slovenia (national team)
2017	Ireland	Eddie Dunbar	Ireland (national team)
2018	Australia	James Whelan	Australia (national team)
2019	Denmark	Andreas Stokbro	Denmark (national team)
2020– 2021	No race due to the COVID-19 pandemic in Belgium		
