= Philippe Deleye =

Belgian cyclist

Personal information
- Full name: Philippe Deleye
- Born: 22 August 1962 (age 64) Belgium

Cycling career
- Sport: Cycling
- Current team: Retired
- Discipline: Road
- Role: Rider

Professional teams
- 1985–1986: Fangio–Ecoturbo–Eylenbosch
- 1987: Robland–Isoglass

Philippe Deleye (born 2 August 1962) is a Belgian former professional racing cyclist. He rode in one Cycling monument in his career the 1987 Milan–San Remo where he finished in 149th.

== Major results ==
1984
1st Ronde van Vlaanderen Beloften
1985
3rd GP Stad Zottegem
6th Brussels–Ingooigem
1986
6th Flèche Hesbignonne
