= 1995 E3 Prijs Vlaanderen =

1995 E3 Harelbeke
Race details
- Dates: 25 March 1995
- Stages: 1
- Distance: 206 km (128 mi)
- Winning time: 4h 53' 00"

Results
	Winner	Bart Leysen (BEL)	(Mapei–GB–Latexco)
	Second	Steffen Wesemann (SUI)	(Team Telekom)
	Third	Carlo Bomans (BEL)	(Mapei–GB–Latexco)

The 1995 E3 Harelbeke was the 38th edition of the E3 Harelbeke cycle race and was held on 25 March 1995. The race started and finished in Harelbeke. The race was won by Bart Leysen of the Mapei team.

== General classification ==
Final general classification

Rank	Rider	Team	Time
1	Bart Leysen (BEL)	Mapei–GB–Latexco	4h 53' 00"
2	Steffen Wesemann (SUI)	Team Telekom	+ 11"
3	Carlo Bomans (BEL)	Mapei–GB–Latexco	+ 11"
4	Jo Planckaert (BEL)	Collstrop–Lystex	+ 11"
5	Tristan Hoffman (NED)	TVM–Polis Direct	+ 11"
6	Giovanni Fidanza (ITA)	Polti–Granarolo–Santini	+ 11"
7	Mauro Bettin (ITA)	Aki–Gipiemme	+ 11"
8	Rolf Sørensen (DEN)	MG Maglificio–Technogym	+ 11"
9	Wim Omloop (BEL)	Collstrop–Lystex	+ 11"
10	Guido Bontempi (ITA)	Gewiss–Ballan	+ 11"
