= 1992 E3 Prijs Vlaanderen =

1992 E3 Harelbeke
Race details
- Dates: 28 March 1992
- Stages: 1
- Distance: 205 km (127 mi)
- Winning time: 5h 18' 00"

Results
| | Winner | Johan Museeuw (BEL) | (Lotto–Mavic–MBK) |
| | Second | Wiebren Veenstra (NED) | (Buckler–Colnago–Decca) |
| | Third | Eric Vanderaerden (BEL) | (Buckler–Colnago–Decca) |

The 1992 E3 Harelbeke was the 35th edition of the E3 Harelbeke cycle race and was held on 28 March 1992. The race started and finished in Harelbeke. The race was won by Johan Museeuw of the Lotto team.

== General classification ==
Final general classification

| Rank | Rider | Team | Time |
|---|---|---|---|
| 1 | Johan Museeuw (BEL) | Lotto–Mavic–MBK | 5h 18' 00" |
| 2 | Wiebren Veenstra (NED) | Buckler–Colnago–Decca | + 0" |
| 3 | Eric Vanderaerden (BEL) | Buckler–Colnago–Decca | + 0" |
| 4 | Eddy Schurer (NED) | TVM–Sanyo | + 0" |
| 5 | Jean-Pierre Heynderickx (BEL) | Collstrop–Garden Wood | + 0" |
| 6 | Giovanni Fidanza (ITA) | Gatorade–Chateau d'Ax | + 0" |
| 7 | Jelle Nijdam (NED) | Buckler–Colnago–Decca | + 0" |
| 8 | Mario De Clercq (BEL) | Buckler–Colnago–Decca | + 0" |
| 9 | Rob Harmeling (NED) | TVM–Sanyo | + 0" |
| 10 | Nico Verhoeven (NED) | PDM–Ultima–Concorde | + 0" |
