= Humberto Parra =

Colombian cyclist

Personal information
- Born: 3 September 1964 (age 62) Sogamoso, Colombia

Cycling career
- Sport: Cycling
- Role: Rider

Humberto Parra (born 3 September 1964) is a former Colombian racing cyclist. He rode in the 1989 Tour de France and the 1989 Vuelta a España. His brothers, Fabio and Iván were also racing cyclist.
