= Rob Kleinsman =

Dutch cyclist

Personal information
- Born: 15 November 1962 (age 63) Hengelo, Netherlands

Cycling career
- Sport: Cycling
- Role: Rider

Rob Kleinsman (born 15 November 1962) is a former Dutch racing cyclist. He rode in the 1989 Tour de France.
