= José Hipolito Roncancio =

Colombian cyclist

Personal information
- Born: 22 November 1965 (age 60) Bogotá, Colombia

Cycling career
- Sport: Cycling
- Role: Rider

José Hipolito Roncancio (born 22 November 1965) is a former Colombian racing cyclist. He rode in the 1989 Tour de France and the 1988 Vuelta a España.
