= Danny Lippens =

Belgian cyclist

Personal information
- Born: 18 September 1961 (age 65) Eeklo, Belgium

Cycling career
- Sport: Cycling
- Discipline: Retired
- Role: Rider

Professional teams
- 1985: Panasonic–Raleigh
- 1989: Hitachi
- 1990: Isoglass–Garden Wood

Danny Lippens (born 18 September 1961) is a Belgian former professional racing cyclist. He rode in the 1989 Tour de France, but dropped out on stage 14.

== Major results ==
1989
5th Brussel–Ingooigem
10th De Kustpijl
