= Patrick Robeet =

Belgian cyclist

Personal information
- Born: 10 October 1964 (age 62) Leuven, Belgium

Cycling career
- Sport: Cycling
- Discipline: Road
- Role: Rider

Professional teams
- 1988: Lotto
- 1989–1990: Domex–Weinmann
- 1991–1992: Buckler–Colnago–Decca
- 1993: La William–Duvel

Patrick Robeet (born 10 October 1964) is a Belgian former racing cyclist. He rode in the 1989 and the 1990 Tour de France.

== Major results ==
1988
5th Overall Tour de Suisse
9th Druivenkoers-Overijse
1989
6th Giro di Lombardia
10th Milano–Torino
1990
10th Tre Valli Varesine
1993
6th Tour de Berne
