= Ettore Badolato =

Italian cyclist

Personal information
- Born: 28 June 1964 (age 62) Vimercate, Italy

Cycling career
- Sport: Cycling
- Role: Rider

Ettore Badolato (born 28 June 1964) is an Italian former racing cyclist. He rode in the 1989 Tour de France.
