= Bernard Richard (cyclist) =

French cyclist

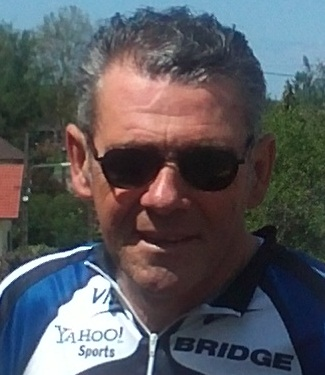
- Richard in 2012

Personal information
- Born: 30 August 1957 (age 69) Évron, France

Cycling career
- Sport: Cycling
- Current team: Retired
- Discipline: Road
- Role: Rider

Professional teams
- 1985–1988: Fagor
- 1989: Café de Colombia

Bernard Richard (born 30 August 1957) is a former French racing cyclist. He rode in 1988 and 1989 editions of both the Tour de France and the Vuelta a España.

== Major results ==
1984
1st Overall Tour d'Eure-et-Loir
1985
1st Chrono des Herbiers
2nd Paris–Roubaix Espoirs
3rd Duo Normand (with Daniel Leveau)
1986
1st Stage 15 Volta a Portugal
6th Overall Tour de la Communauté Européenne
1987
1st Stage 3 Volta a la Comunitat Valenciana
1st Stage 8 Volta a Portugal
3rd Duo Normand (with Roland Le Clerc)
1988
6th Chrono des Herbiers
1989
2nd Chrono des Herbiers
