= Manuel Guijarro (cyclist) =

Spanish cyclist (born 1963)

Personal information
- Full name: Manuel Guijarro Doménech
- Born: 7 January 1963 (age 63) San Vicente del Raspeig, Spain

Cycling career
- Sport: Cycling
- Role: Rider

Manuel Guijarro Doménech (born 7 January 1963) is a Spanish former racing cyclist. He rode in the 1989 Tour de France and the 1989 Vuelta a España.
