= Fangio (cycling team) =

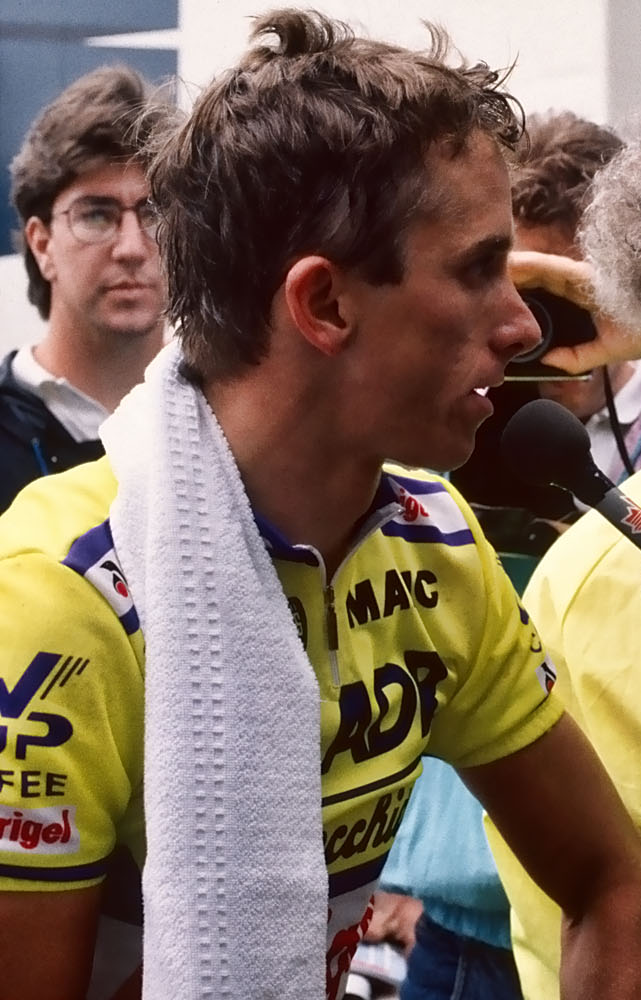
- Greg LeMond at the 1989 Tour de France

Team information
- Registered: Belgium
- Founded: 1979
- Disbanded: 1992
- Discipline: Road
- Bicycles: Rossin (1990); Koga Miyata (1991–1992)

Key personnel
- General manager: Wilfried Reybrouck (with AD Renting); Ludo Voeten (as Tulip Computers)
- Team managers: Guido Reybrouck 1987; José De Cauwer 1988–89

Team name history
- 1979 1980 1981 1982 1983 1984 1985 1986 1986 1987 1988 1988 1989 1990 1991–1992: Fangio–Iso–Bel; Fangio–Amerlinckx–Campagnolo; Fangio–Sapeco–Mavic; Fangio–Assos–OM Trucks–Iveco; Fangio–Tönissteiner–OM Trucks–Mavic; Fangio–Marc–Ecoturbo–Mavic; Fangio–Ecoturbo–Eylenbosch; Fangio–Lois–Mavic; Fangio–ADR; AD Renting–Fangio–IOC–MBK; AD Renting–Mini-Flat–Enerday; AD Renting–Anti-M–Bottecchia; AD Renting–W-Cup–Bottecchia; IOC–Tulip Computers; Tulip Computers
Fangio jersey
Jersey

Fangio, later known as AD Renting and Tulip Computers, was a Belgian professional cycling team that existed from 1975 to 1992.

The team competed after 1979 through to the 1986 Vuelta a España, but did not have any wins. It was succeeded by the AD Renting team. AD Renting (All-Drie Renting), often simply called ADR, existed from 1987 to 1989.

Team Tulip Computers existed from 1990 to 1992. Its main sponsor was Dutch computer manufacturer Tulip Computers. This team should not be confused with the Spanish cycling team also sponsored by Tulip Computers in 1990.

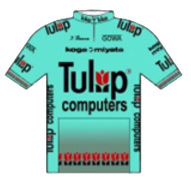
The Tulip Computers jersey

== Tour de France ==
Despite its short history as AD Renting and lack of funds, the team was very successful in the Tour de France. Eddy Planckaert won the points classification in 1988 to go with the victory he achieved in the highly regarded monument the Tour of Flanders earlier that year. In that same spring campaign, Dirk Demol won the Paris–Roubaix after a breakaway of 222 kilometers.

The biggest success was when Greg LeMond, a new signing, won the 1989 Tour de France with the team, taking three stage victories in the process.

== Sponsors ==
The 1990 Team I.O.C. - Tulip Computers was also sponsored and supplied by Rossin Bikes.

Koga Miyata was the team's 1991–1992 subsponsor. The bicycle manufacturer from Heerenveen had previously sponsored IJsboerke and Capri Sonne. It also sponsored an amateur team, which would be a good development team for the professionals.

== Rosters ==
As of 1 January 1986

Rider	Date of birth
Edwin Bafcop (BEL)	24 December 1962 (aged 23)
Luc Colijn (BEL)	2 May 1958 (aged 27)
John De Keukelaere (BEL)	21 February 1962 (aged 23)
Philippe Deleye (BEL)	2 August 1962 (aged 23)
Dirk Demol (BEL)	4 November 1959 (aged 26)
Dirk Durant (BEL)	10 October 1961 (aged 24)
Dennis Ertveldt (BEL)	21 October 1954 (aged 31)
Bruno Geuens (BEL)	20 October 1963 (aged 22)
Rigobert Matt (GER)	10 May 1963 (aged 22)
Luc Meersman (BEL)	2 March 1960 (aged 25)
Co Moritz (NED)	6 June 1950 (aged 35)

Rider	Date of birth
John Mullan (NZL)	9 August 1955 (aged 30)
William Tackaert (BEL)	9 April 1956 (aged 29)
Eddy Van Hoof (BEL)	19 January 1952 (aged 33)
Filip Van Vooren (BEL)	6 August 1962 (aged 23)
Eddy Vanhaerens (BEL)	23 February 1954 (aged 31)
Gery Verlinden (BEL)	1 May 1954 (aged 31)
Patrick Verplancke (BEL)	26 October 1962 (aged 23)
Patrick Versluys (BEL)	5 September 1958 (aged 27)
Luc Wallays (BEL)	7 August 1961 (aged 24)
Christian Wauters (BEL)	5 February 1960 (aged 25)

As Tulip Compters the team was led by Director Sportif José De Cauwer. It had riders like Johan van der Velde, Frank Hoste, Fons de Wolf, Olaf Jentzsch, Adri van der Poel and Allan Peiper. Manager Ludo Voeten, who was also manager of artists like Peter Koelewijn, Danny de Munk and Grant & Forsyth, represented Tulip Computers as general manager of the team.

== Major wins ==
1980
Overall Tour of Ireland, Dave Cuming
1981
Omloop Schelde-Durme, Rudy Matthijs
1982
Omloop van het Zuidwesten, Alain Van Hoornweder
De Kustpijl, Kurt Dockx
1983
Le Samyn, Jacques van Meer
Omloop van het Waasland, Alain Van Hoornweder
Tour Européen Lorraine-Alsace

Stage 1a, Michel Dernies
Stage 2, Léo Wellens

Stage 8b Tour de l'Avenir, Léo Wellens
1984
Grand Prix de Denain, Yves Godimus
Dwars door West-Vlaanderen, William Tackaert
Stage 1 Tour de Luxembourg, William Tackaert
1985
Kuurne–Brussels–Kuurne, William Tackaert
Omloop van het Waasland, William Tackaert
Stage 1 Danmark Rundt, Eric Van Lancker
Stage 3 Tour de Luxembourg, Philippe Van Vooren
Stage 4 Herald Sun Tour, William Tackaert
Stage 1a Three Days of De Panne, William Tackaert
1986
Nokere Koerse, Luc Colijn
De Kustpijl, Patrick Versluys
Stage 5b Four Days of Dunkirk, Rigobert Matt
Stage 2 Danmark Rundt, Eddy Vanhaerens
1988
Paris–Roubaix, Dirk Demol
Tour of Flanders, Eddy Planckaert
Points Classification Tour de France, Eddy Planckaert
1989
E3-Prijs Vlaanderen, Eddy Planckaert
Vuelta a España, stage 1, Marnix Lameire
Vuelta a España, stage 5, Eddy Planckaert
Overall Tour de France, Greg LeMond

Stages 5, 19 & 21, Greg LeMond

Road race, UCI Road World Championships, Greg LeMond
