= Franck Pineau =

French cyclist

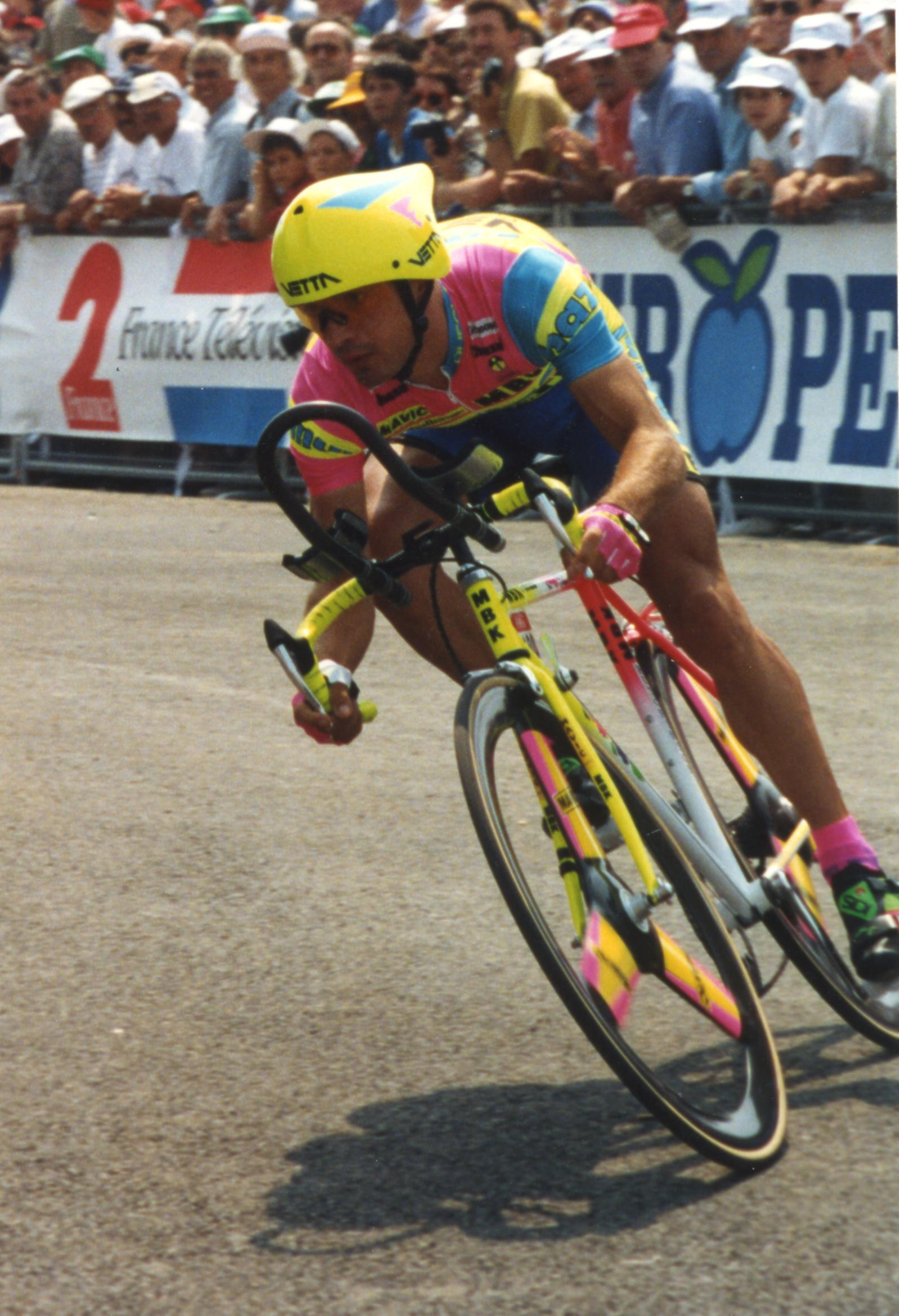
- Pineau at the 1993 Tour de France

Personal information
- Born: 27 March 1963 (age 63) Bourges, France

Cycling career
- Sport: Cycling
- Current team: Groupama–FDJ United
- Discipline: Road
- Role: Rider; Directeur sportif

Amateur teams
- 1977–1980: ES Florentinoise
- 1981: VS Nivernais Morvan
- 1982–1986: Stade Auxerrois

Professional teams
- 1986: Miko–Tönissteiner–Carlos–Fevrier
- 1986–1987: Reynolds
- 1988–1990: RMO–Cycles Méral–Mavic
- 1991: Mosoca–Eurocar–Chazal
- 1992–1994: Chazal–Vanille et Mûre

Managerial team
- 2000–: Française des Jeux

Franck Pineau (born 27 March 1963) is a French former racing cyclist, who currently works as a directeur sportif for UCI WorldTeam Groupama–FDJ United. He rode in the 1989 Vuelta a España, 1989 Tour de France and 1993 Tour de France.

== Major results ==
1986
1st Stage 1 Grand Prix du Midi Libre
5th Overall Tour du Limousin
1987
9th Grand Prix de Mauléon-Moulins
1988
1st Boucles de l'Aulne
6th Grand Prix de Cholet-Mauléon-Moulins
8th Overall Tour du Limousin
1989
7th Overall Route du Sud
1990
2nd Overall Tour d'Armorique
1991
5th Overall Grand Prix du Midi Libre
6th Overall Circuit Cycliste Sarthe
1992
2nd Overall Tour de l'Essonne
3rd Overall Tour d'Armorique
1993
3rd Bordeaux–Caudéran
8th Paris–Camembert
10th Paris–Bourges
