= Roland Le Clerc =

French cyclist (born 1963)

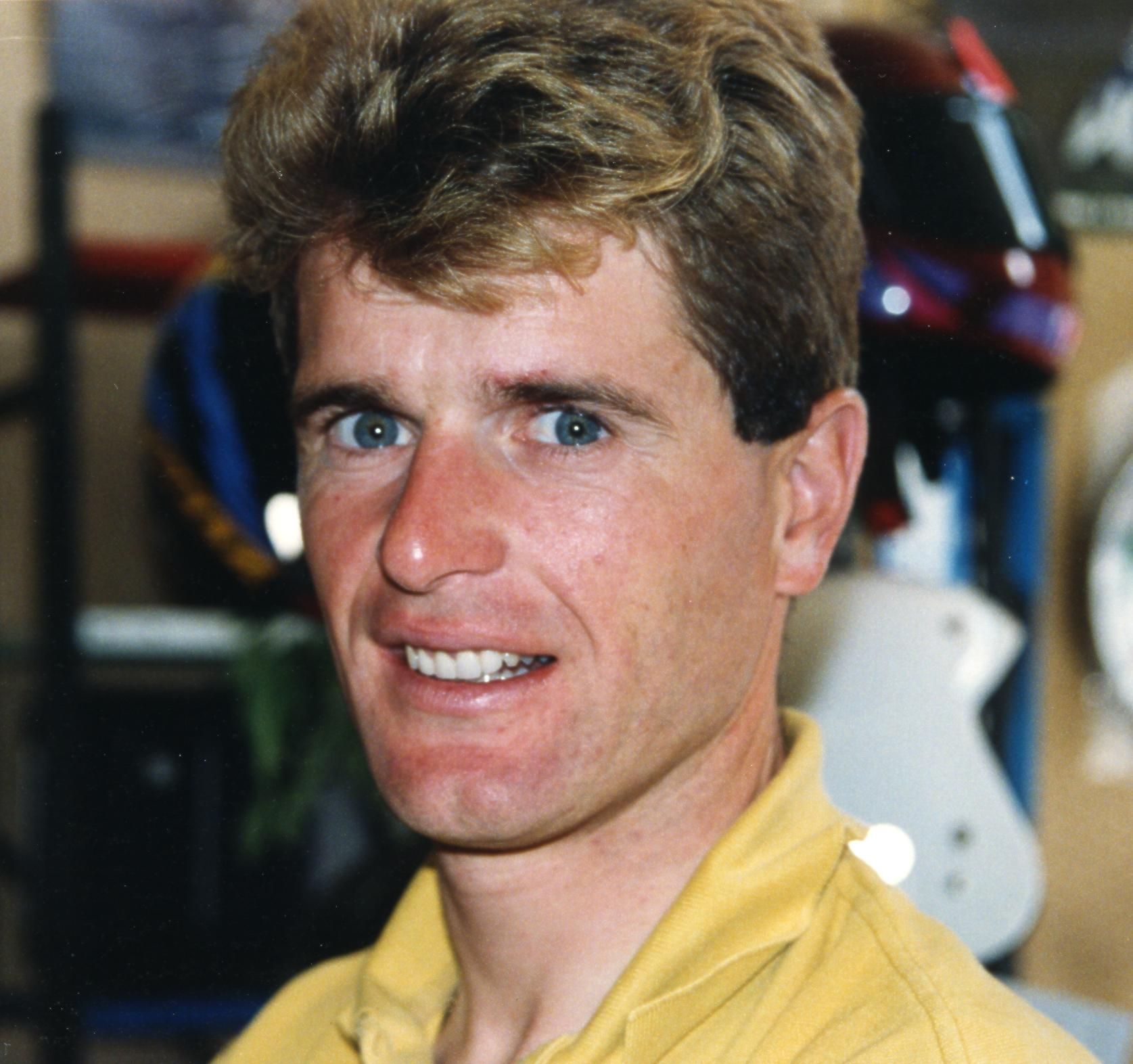

Personal information
- Born: 30 May 1963 (age 63) Saint-Brieuc, France

Cycling career
- Sport: Cycling
- Current team: Retired
- Discipline: Road
- Role: Rider

Professional teams
- 1986–1989: Seat–Orbea
- 1990: Toshiba
- 1991: Amaya Seguros
- 1992: Castorama
- 1992: Banana Australia
- 1993: Novemail–Histor–Laser Computer

Roland Le Clerc (born 30 May 1963) is a former French racing cyclist. He rode in ten Grand Tours between 1987 and 1991.

== Major results ==
1983
3rd Duo Normand (with Bruno Cornillet)
1987
3rd Duo Normand (with Bernard Richard)
1989
1st Grand Prix de Cannes
1st Route du Pays Basque, Essor Basque
1st Stage 4 Tour de Luxembourg
1st Trio Normand (with Philippe Bouvatier and Joël Pelier)
2nd Tour du Haut-Var
3rd Tour Méditerranéen
10th Overall Vuelta Ciclista al Pais Vasco
1990
3rd Boucles Parisiennes
1991
1st Trofeo Comunidad Foral de Navarra
1992
3rd Overall Herald Sun Tour
4th Grand Prix d'Ouverture La Marseillaise
1993
10th Overall Tour de Romandie

=== Grand Tour general classification results timeline ===
Grand Tour	1986	1987	1988	1989	1990	1991
Giro d'Italia	—	79	—	—	—	—
Tour de France	—	107	70	116	84	106
Vuelta a España	57	—	91	63	—	62

Legend
—	Did not compete
DNF	Did not finish
