= Patrick Tolhoek =

Dutch cyclist

Personal information
- Full name: Patrick Tolhoek
- Born: 26 June 1965 (age 61) Yerseke, the Netherlands

Cycling career
- Sport: Cycling
- Discipline: Road/Mountainbike
- Role: Rider

Professional teams
- 1988: Roland
- 1989: Suferconfex
- 1990–1991: Buckler

Patrick Tolhoek (born Yerseke, 26 June 1965) is a retired Dutch professional cyclist.

== Career ==
In 1985, Tolhoek won the national road race for militaries. In 1989 and 1990, Tolhoek rode the Tour de France. During his first years as professional cyclist, he had problems with his left leg. At the end of 1991, he had to stop his professional career because of this.

Three years later, after an operation, he was able to ride professionally again, this time on the mountainbike. In 1998, he became Dutch national mountainbike champion. In 2000, Tolhoek entered the Mountainbike event during the Olympic games, but did not finish. At the end of that year, Tolhoek ended his career.

== Personal life ==
His father Ko Tolhoek was also a professional cyclist. His son Antwan Tolhoek is also a professional cyclist.

== See also ==
- List of Dutch Olympic cyclists
