= Abelardo Rondón =

Colombian cyclist

Personal information
- Born: 18 March 1964 (age 62) Zapatoca, Colombia

Cycling career
- Sport: Cycling
- Role: Rider

Abelardo Rondón (born 18 March 1964) is a Colombian former racing cyclist. He rode in twelve Grand Tours between 1986 and 1993. He rode in support of former tour winner Pedro Delgado in 1990 assisting him to a 4th-place finish. In 1991 he rode with Delgado in supporting Miguel Indurain, who won his first of five consecutive Tours. Rondón finished in 12th place overall. The following year he switched to the Gatorade team where he rode with another former champ in Laurent Fignon, and supported Gianni Bugno who finished on the podium in 3rd.
