= Valerio Tebaldi =

Italian cyclist

Personal information
- Full name: Valerio Tebaldi
- Born: 2 July 1965 (age 61) Chiuduno, Italy

Cycling career
- Sport: Cycling
- Current team: Retired
- Discipline: Road
- Role: Rider

Major wins
- 2 stages Tour de France

Valerio Tebaldi (born 2 July 1965) is a former Italian professional road bicycle racer. Tebaldi was born at Chiuduno. He won a stage in the 1988 Tour de France and in the 1989 Tour de France.

== Major results ==
1988
Tour de France:

Winner stage 7

1989
Tour de France:

Winner stage 12
