= Helmut Wechselberger =

Austrian cyclist

Personal information
- Born: 12 February 1953 (age 73) Jerzens, Austria

Cycling career
- Sport: Cycling

Helmut Wechselberger (born 12 February 1953) is an Austrian racing cyclist. He won the 1988 Tour de Suisse. He also competed in the individual road race and the team time trial events at the 1984 Summer Olympics. He won the Austrian National Road Race Championships in 1984.
