= Filip Van Vooren =

Belgian cyclist

Personal information
- Born: 6 August 1962 (age 64) Ghent, Belgium

Cycling career
- Sport: Cycling
- Role: Rider

Filip Van Vooren (born 6 August 1962) is a former Belgian racing cyclist. He rode in the 1989 Tour de France.
