= Eddy Schurer =

Dutch cyclist (born 1964)

Personal information
- Born: 12 September 1964 (age 62) Bakkeveen, Netherlands

Cycling career
- Sport: Cycling
- Discipline: Road
- Role: Rider

Professional teams
- 1987: Transvemij–Van Schilt
- 1988–1993: TVM–Van Schilt
- 1994: Novemail–Histor–Laser Computer

Eddy Schurer (born 12 September 1964) is a Dutch former racing cyclist. He rode in three editions of the Tour de France.

== Career achievements ==
=== Major results ===
1985
1st Ronde van Overijssel
1986
1st Stage 5b Olympia's Tour
1987
2nd Overall Olympia's Tour

1st Stages 1, 7b (ITT) & 9

1989
1st Grand Prix de la Libération (TTT)
2nd Omloop van het Leiedal
3rd Overall Ronde van Nederland
3rd Overall Tour de Luxembourg
4th E3 Harelbeke
1990
4th Overall Tour de Luxembourg

1st Stage 2

4th Kuurne–Brussels–Kuurne
7th Overall Ronde van Nederland

1st Stage 6

10th Overall Four Days of Dunkirk
1991
1st Stage 4 Tour de Luxembourg
3rd Overall Ronde van Nederland

1st Stage 5

4th Veenendaal–Veenendaal
9th E3 Harelbeke
1992
1st Stage 1 Hofbrau Cup
4th E3 Harelbeke
9th Overall Driedaagse van De Panne-Koksijde
1993
1st Stage 7 Four Days of Dunkirk
3rd GP Rik Van Steenbergen
7th Le Samyn

=== Grand Tour general classification results timeline ===
Grand Tour	1989	1990	1991
Giro d'Italia	—	—	—
Tour de France	132	DNF	152
Vuelta a España	—	—	—

Legend
DSQ	Disqualified
DNF	Did not finish
