= Laurent Biondi =

French cyclist (born 1959)

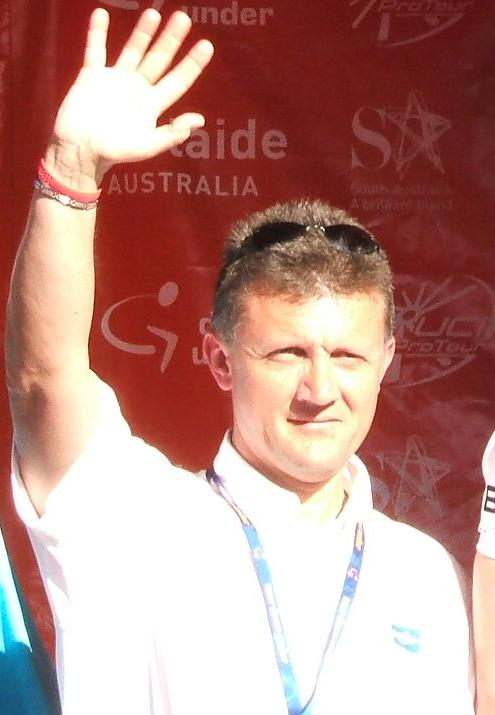
Laurent Biondi in Australia

Laurent Biondi (born 19 June 1959, Grenoble France) is a former French cyclist. He was the Amateur Champion of France in 1982 and turned professional in 1983, competing until 1993. Later he became the team manager of the Ag2r–La Mondiale.

== Teams ==
- 1983 to 1984: La Redoute–Motobécane (France)
- 1985: Hitachi–Splendor (Belgium)
- 1986: Système U (France)
- 1986: Miko–Carlos (France)
- 1987: Système U (France)
- 1988: Toshiba (France)
- 1989: Fagor–MBK (France)
- 1990: History–Sigma (Belgium)
- 1991: Tonton Tapis–GB (Belgium)
- 1992: Chazal–Vanilla Mûre (France)
- 1993: Chazal–Vetta–MBK (France)
