= Giovanni Fidanza =

Italian road bicycle racer

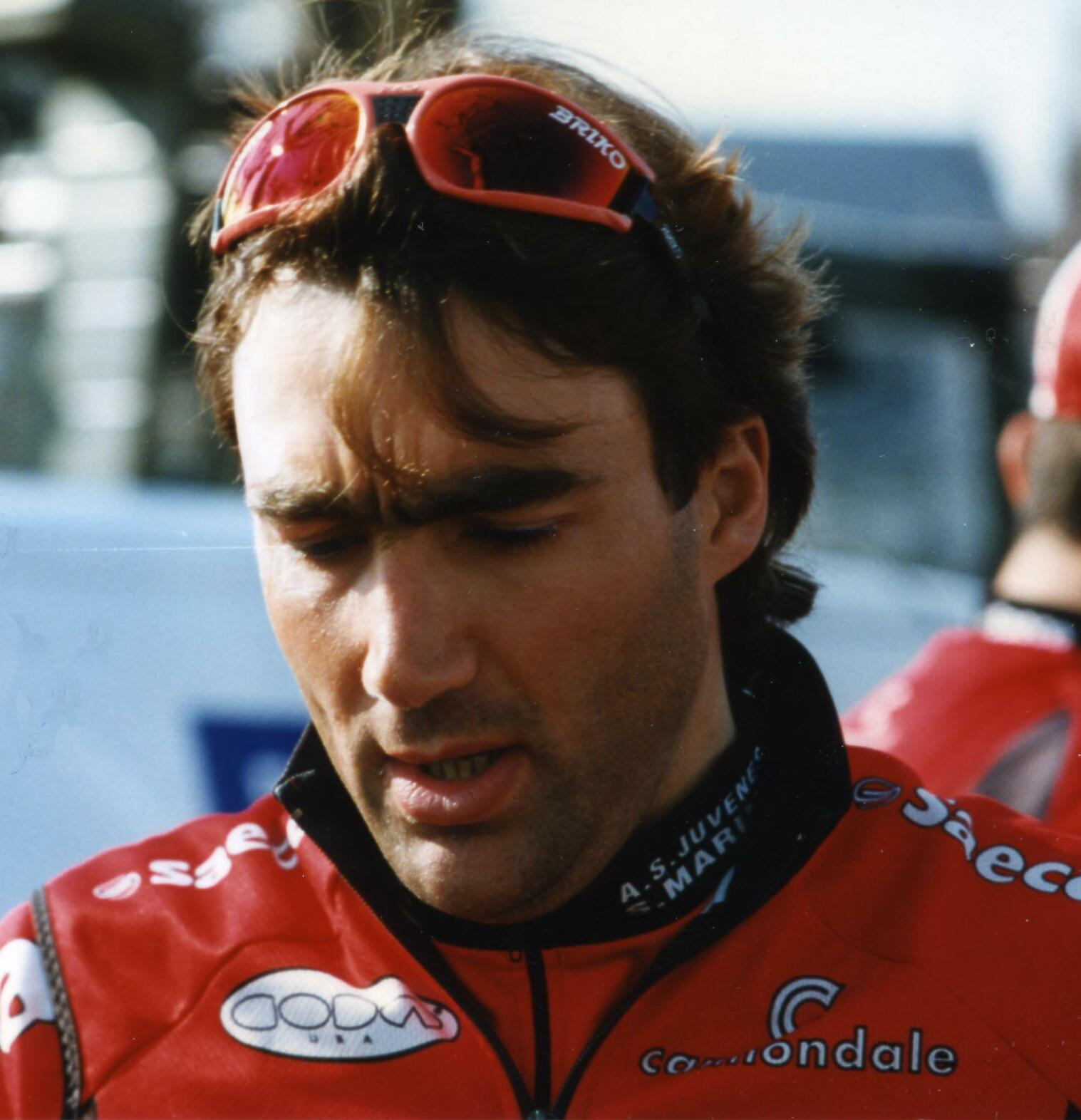
- Fidanza in 1997.

Personal information
- Full name: Giovanni Fidanza
- Born: September 27, 1965 (age 61) Bergamo, Italy

Cycling career
- Sport: Cycling
- Current team: Isolmant–Premac–Vittoria
- Discipline: Road
- Role: Rider (retired); Directeur sportif

Professional teams
- 1989–1993: Chateau d'Ax
- 1994–1995: Team Polti–Vaporetto
- 1996: Carrera Jeans–Tassoni
- 1997: Saeco–Estro

Managerial teams
- 1998–2000: Team Polti
- 2001–2002: Alexia Alluminio
- 2003–2006: Team Telekom
- 2007: Astana
- 2008–2009: LPR Brakes–Ballan
- 2010: De Rosa–Stac Plastic
- 2017: Astana
- 2018–: Eurotarget–Bianchi–Vitasana

Major wins
- Grand Tours Tour de France 1 individual stage (1989) Giro d'Italia Points classification (1989) 1 individual stage (1990)

Giovanni Fidanza (born 27 September 1965 in Bergamo) is an Italian former professional road bicycle racer, who competed professionally between 1989 and 1997. In the 1989 Giro d'Italia, Fidanza won the points classification. Fidanza also won a stage in the 1989 Tour de France. He now works as a directeur sportif for UCI Women's Continental Team Isolmant–Premac–Vittoria, for whom his daughters have been members; Arianna Fidanza previously rode for the team, and Martina Fidanza currently rides for them.

== Major results ==
1987
6th Gran Premio della Liberazione
1988
1st Stage 13 Peace Race
1989
1st Stage 20 Tour de France
1st Points classification Giro d'Italia
1990
1st Stage 2 Giro d'Italia
2nd Trofeo Laigueglia
2nd Millemetri del Corso di Mestre
1992
6th E3 Prijs Vlaanderen
8th Brabantse Pijl
9th Gent-Wevelgem
1993
1st Stage 3 Tirreno-Adriatico
1st Stage 6 Tour de Romandie
1994
1st Continentale Classic
5th GP de Fourmies
7th Paris-Tours
10th Rund um den Henninger Turm
1995
1st Stage 4a Tour de Romandie
2nd Classic Haribo
2nd GP d'Europe
3rd Scheldeprijs
6th E3 Prijs Vlaanderen
