= Rik Van Slycke =

Belgian cyclist

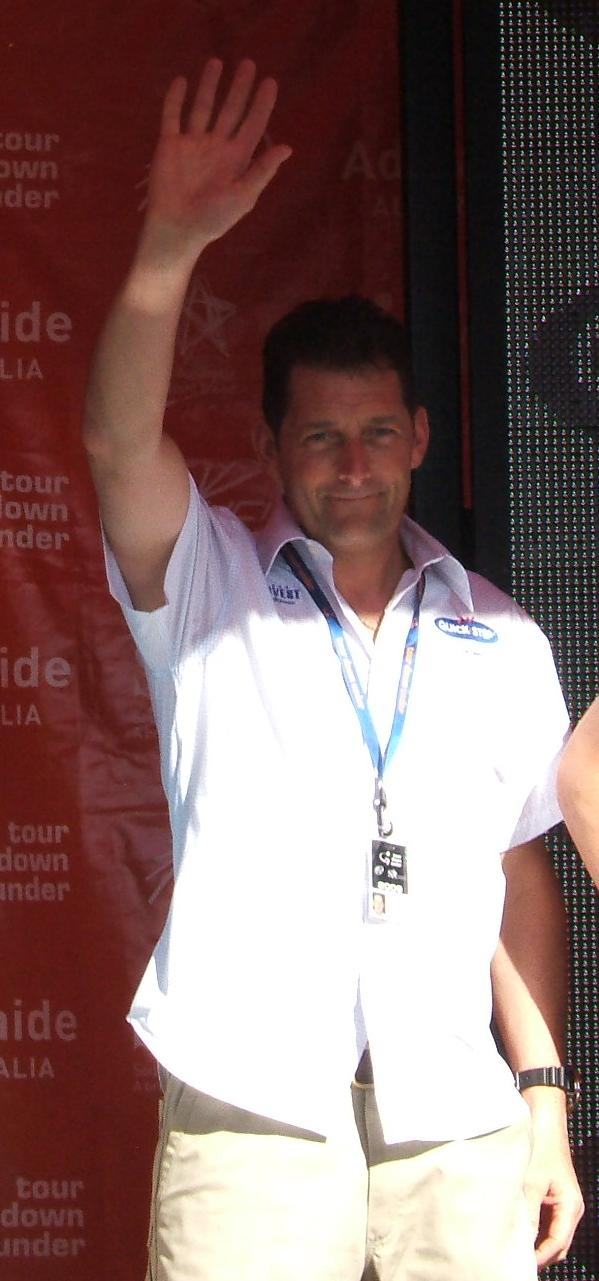

Personal information
- Full name: Rik Van Slycke
- Born: 3 February 1963 (age 63) Ghent, Belgium

Cycling career
- Sport: Cycling
- Discipline: Road
- Role: Rider

Professional teams
- 1988–1989: Sigma - Fina
- 1990: Histor - Sigma
- 1991–1999: Lotto - Super Club

Major wins
- Nokere Koerse (1989)

Rik Van Slycke (2 February 1963) is a former Belgian cyclist. He is now a directeur sportif with the Quick Step cycling team.

== Major results ==
1989
1st Nokere Koerse
1992
10th Stage 20 Tour de France
1993
9th Trofeo Laigueglia
