= Netherlands at the UCI Road World Championships =

- IOC code: NED
- Medals: Gold 40 Silver 32 Bronze 38 Total 110

The Netherlands first sent athletes to the UCI Road World Championships in the begin 1920s when only amateur cyclist competed. The nation's first medal, a bronze, was earned by Gerrit van den Berg in the men's amateur road race. Kees Pellenaars won the first gold medal for the Netherlands in the amateur road race. Theo Middelkamp won the first gold medal in the elite category in 1947.

== List of medalists ==
This is a list of Dutch medals won at the UCI Road World Championships.

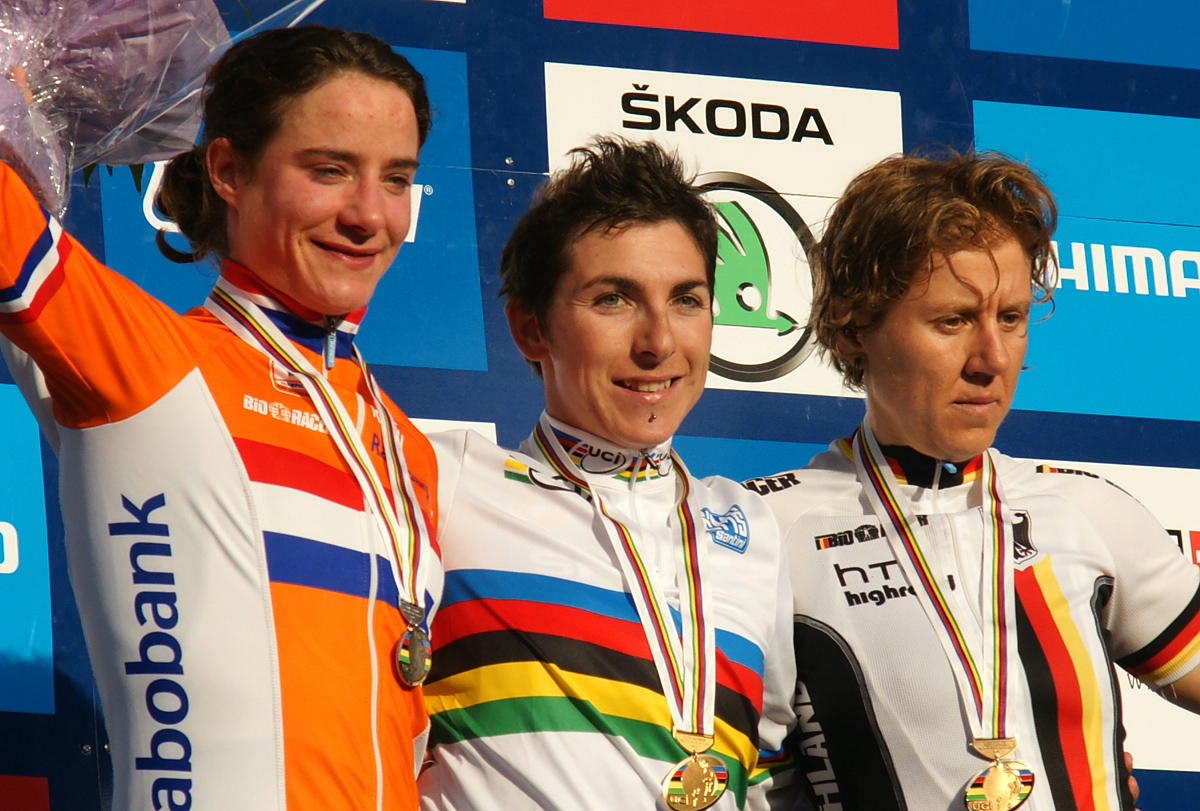
Marianne Vos finished second in the women's road race in 2011.

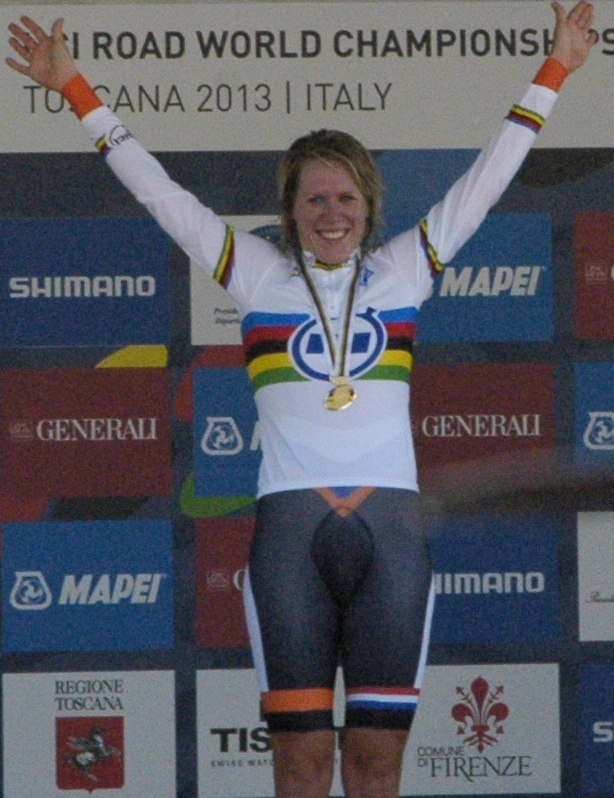
Ellen van Dijk won the women's time trial in 2013.

Medal	Championship	Name	Event
Bronze	(Netherlands) 1925 Apeldoorn	Gerrit van den Berg	Men's amateur road race
Bronze	(France) 1933 Montlhéry	Marinus Valentijn	Men's road race
Gold	(Germany) 1934 Leipzig	Kees Pellenaars	Men's amateur road race
Bronze	(Switzerland) 1936 Bern	Theo Middelkamp	Men's road race
Bronze	(Netherlands) 1938 Valkenburg	Joop Demmenie	Men's amateur road race
Gold	(France) 1947 Reims	Theo Middelkamp	Men's road race
Bronze	(France) 1947 Reims	Sjef Janssen	Men's road race
Bronze	(France) 1947 Reims	Gerard van Beek	Men's amateur road race
Gold	(Denmark) 1949 Copenhagen	Henk Faanhof	Men's amateur road race
Bronze	(Denmark) 1949 Copenhagen	Hub Vinken	Men's amateur road race
Silver	(Belgium) 1950 Moorslede	Theo Middelkamp	Men's road race
Bronze	(Italy) 1951 Varese	Jan Plantaz	Men's amateur road race
Bronze	(Germany) 1954 Sollingen	Martin van der Borgh	Men's amateur road race
Gold	(Denmark) 1956 Copenhagen	Frans Mahn	Men's amateur road race
Bronze	(Denmark) 1956 Copenhagen	Gerrit Schulte	Men's road race
Bronze	(Denmark) 1956 Copenhagen	Jan Buis	Men's amateur road race
Bronze	(Belgium) 1957 Waregem	Schalk Verhoef	Men's amateur road race
Bronze	(Netherlands) 1959 Zandvoort	Bas Maliepaard	Men's amateur road race
Bronze	(Italy) 1962 Salo	Arie den Hartog	Men's amateur road race
Bronze	(Belgium) 1963 Ronse	Jo de Haan	Men's road race
Gold	(France) 1964 Sallanches	Jan Janssen	Men's road race
Gold	(Germany) 1966 Nürburgring	Evert Dolman	Men's amateur road race
Silver	(Germany) 1966 Nürburgring	Keetie van Oosten-Hage	Women's road race
Silver	(Germany) 1966 Nürburgring	Eddy Beugels; Tiemen Groen; Harry Steevens; Rini Wagtmans	Men's team time trial
Silver	(Netherlands) 1967 Heerlen	Jan Janssen	Men's road race
Bronze	(Netherlands) 1967 Heerlen	René Pijnen	Men's amateur road race
Gold	(Italy) 1968 Imola	Keetie van Oosten-Hage	Women's road race
Gold	(Belgium) 1969 Zolder	Harm Ottenbros	Men's road race
Bronze	(United Kingdom) 1970 Leicester	Fedor den Hertog; Popke Oosterhof; Tino Tabak; Adri Duycker	Men's team time trial
Silver	(Switzerland) 1971 Mendrisio	Fedor den Hertog; Adri Duycker; Frits Schür; Aad van den Hoek	Men's team time trial
Bronze	(Switzerland) 1971 Mendrisio	Keetie van Oosten-Hage	Women's road race
Silver	(Spain) 1973 Barcelona	Keetie van Oosten-Hage	Women's road race
Bronze	(Canada) 1974 Montreal	Keetie van Oosten-Hage	Women's road race
Gold	(Belgium) 1975 Mettet and Yvoir	Hennie Kuiper	Men's road race
Gold	(Belgium) 1975 Mettet and Yvoir	Tineke Fopma	Women's road race
Gold	(Belgium) 1975 Mettet and Yvoir	Andre Gevers	Men's amateur road race
Silver	(Switzerland) 1975 Lausanne	Ad Verstijlen	Men's junior road race
Bronze	(Belgium) 1975 Mettet and Yvoir	Keetie van Oosten-Hage	Women's road race
Gold	(Italy) 1976 Ostuni	Keetie van Oosten-Hage	Women's road race
Bronze	(Venezuela) 1977 San Cristóbal	Minnie Brinkhof	Women's road race
Gold	(Germany) 1978 Nürburgring	Gerrie Knetemann	Men's road race
Gold	(Germany) 1978 Nürburgring	Guus Bierings; Bert Oosterbosch; Bart van Est; Jan van Houwelingen	Men's team time trial
Silver	(Germany) 1978 Nürburgring	Keetie van Oosten-Hage	Women's road race
Gold	(Netherlands) 1979 Valkenburg	Jan Raas	Men's road race
Gold	(Netherlands) 1979 Valkenburg	Petra de Bruijn	Women's road race
Gold	(United Kingdom) 1982 Goodwood	Maarten Ducrot; Gerard Schipper; Gerrit Solleveld; Frits van Bindsbergen	Men's team time trial
Silver	(Switzerland) 1983 Altenrhein	Adri van der Poel	Men's road race
Gold	(France) 1984 Beuvron	Tom Cordes	Men's junior road race
Gold	(Italy) 1985 Giavera del Montello	Joop Zoetemelk	Men's road race
Gold	(Germany) 1985 Stuttgart	Raymond Meijs	Men's junior road race
Gold	(United States) 1986 Colorado Springs	Tom Cordes; Gerrit de Vries; John Talen; Rob Harmeling	Men's team time trial
Gold	(Morocco) 1986 Casablanca	Michel Zanoli	Men's junior road race
Silver	(United States) 1986 Colorado Springs	John Talen	Men's amateur road race
Silver	(Morocco) 1986 Casablanca	Richard Luppes	Men's junior road race
Bronze	(United States) 1986 Colorado Springs	Arjan Jagt	Men's amateur road race
Silver	(Italy) 1987 Bergamo	Erik Dekker	Men's junior road race
Silver	(Austria) 1987 Villach	Heleen Hage	Women's road race
Bronze	(Austria) 1987 Villach	Connie Meyer	Women's road race
Bronze	(Italy) 1987 Bergamo	Maarten den Bakker; Rober van de Vin; Gerard Kemper; Antoine Lagerwey	Men's junior team time trial
Silver	(Denmark) 1988 Odense	Esther van Verseveld	Women's junior road race
Gold	(Japan) 1990 Utsunomiya	Leontien van Moorsel; Monique Knol; Astrid Schop; Cora Westland	Women's team time trial
Bronze	(United Kingdom) 1990 Middlesbrough	Daniëlle Overgaag	Women's junior road race
Gold	(Germany) 1991 Stuttgart	Leontien van Moorsel	Women's road race
Gold	(United States) 1991 Colorado Springs	Elsbeth van Rooy-Vink	Women's junior road race
Silver	(Germany) 1991 Stuttgart	Cora Westland; Astrid Schop; Monique Knol; Monique De Bruin	Women's team time trial
Silver	(Germany) 1991 Stuttgart	Steven Rooks	Men's road race
Bronze	(Greece) 1992 Olympia	Marion Borst	Women's junior road race
Gold	(Norway) 1993 Oslo	Leontien van Moorsel	Women's road race
Gold	(Colombia) 1995 Duitema	Danny Nelissen	Men's amateur road race
Gold	(Spain) 1997 San Sebastián	Mirella Van Melis	Women's junior road race
Bronze	(Spain) 1997 San Sebastián	Léon van Bon	Men's road race
Gold	(Netherlands) 1998 Valkenburg	Leontien van Moorsel	Women's time trial
Silver	(Netherlands) 1998 Valkenburg	Leontien van Moorsel	Women's road race
Gold	(Italy) 1999 Verona	Leontien van Moorsel	Women's time trial
Silver	(France) 2000 Plouay	Chantal Beltman	Women's road race
Bronze	(France) 2000 Plouay	Bertine Spijkerman	Women's junior time trial
Silver	(Portugal) 2001 Lisbon	Niels Scheuneman	Men's junior road race
Silver	(Portugal) 2001 Lisbon	Pleuni Möhlmann	Women's junior road race
Bronze	(Portugal) 2001 Lisbon	Niels Scheuneman	Men's junior time trial
Gold	(Belgium) 2002 Limburg	Suzanne de Goede	Women's junior road race
Gold	(Canada) 2003 Hamilton	Kai Reus	Men's junior road race
Gold	(Canada) 2003 Hamilton	Loes Markerink	Women's junior road race
Silver	(Canada) 2003 Hamilton	Mirjam Melchers	Women's road race
Silver	(Canada) 2003 Hamilton	Niels Scheuneman	Men's under-23 time trial
Silver	(Canada) 2003 Hamilton	Loes Markerink	Women's junior time trial
Bronze	(Canada) 2003 Hamilton	Thomas Dekker	Men's under-23 road race
Bronze	(Canada) 2003 Hamilton	Iris Slappendel	Women's junior time trial
Gold	(Italy) 2004 Verona	Marianne Vos	Women's junior road race
Silver	(Italy) 2004 Verona	Thomas Dekker	Men's under-23 road race
Silver	(Italy) 2004 Verona	Thomas Dekker	Men's under-23 time trial
Bronze	(Italy) 2004 Verona	Ellen van Dijk	Women's junior road race
Silver	(Austria) 2005 Salzburg	Marianne Vos	Women's junior road race
Gold	(Austria) 2006 Salzburg	Marianne Vos	Women's road race
Gold	(Germany) 2007 Stuttgart	Lars Boom	Men's under-23 time trial
Silver	(Germany) 2007 Stuttgart	Marianne Vos	Women's road race
Bronze	(Germany) 2007 Stuttgart	Stef Clement	Men's time trial
Silver	(Italy) 2008 Varese	Marianne Vos	Women's road race
Silver	(Switzerland) 2009 Mendrisio	Marianne Vos	Women's road race
Silver	(Australia) 2010 Geelong and Melbourne	Marianne Vos	Women's road race
Silver	(Denmark) 2011 Copenhagen	Marianne Vos	Women's road race
Bronze	(Denmark) 2011 Copenhagen	Steven Lammertink	Men's junior road race
Gold	(Netherlands) 2012 Valkenburg	Marianne Vos	Women's road race
Bronze	(Netherlands) 2012 Valkenburg	AA Drink–leontien.nl; Chantal Blaak (NED); Lucinda Brand (NED); Jessie Daams (BEL); Sharon Laws (GBR); Emma Pooley (GBR); Kirsten Wild (NED)	Women's team time trial
Bronze	(Netherlands) 2012 Valkenburg	Demi de Jong	Women's junior time trial
Gold	(Italy) 2013 Tuscany	Ellen van Dijk	Women's time trial
Gold	(Italy) 2013 Tuscany	Mathieu van der Poel	Men's junior road race
Gold	(Italy) 2013 Tuscany	Marianne Vos	Women's road race
Silver	(Italy) 2013 Tuscany	Rabobank-Liv Giant; Lucinda Brand (NED); Thalita de Jong (NED); Pauline Ferrand-Prévot (FRA); Roxane Knetemann (NED); Annemiek van Vleuten (NED); Marianne Vos (NED)	Women's team time trial
Bronze	(Spain) 2014 Ponferrada	Tom Dumoulin	Men's time trial
Bronze	(Spain) 2014 Ponferrada	Peter Lenderink	Men's junior road race
Silver	(United States) 2015 Richmond	Boels–Dolmans; Lizzie Armitstead (GBR); Chantal Blaak (NED); Christine Majerus (LUX); Katarzyna Pawłowska (POL); Evelyn Stevens (USA); Ellen van Dijk (NED)	Women's team time trial
Bronze	(United States) 2015 Richmond	Rabobank-Liv Woman Cycling Team; Lucinda Brand (NED); Thalita de Jong (NED); Shara Gillow (AUS); Roxane Knetemann (NED); Katarzyna Niewiadoma (POL); Anna van der Breggen (NED)	Women's team time trial
Silver	(United States) 2015 Richmond	Anna van der Breggen	Women's time trial
Silver	(United States) 2015 Richmond	Anna van der Breggen	Women's road race
Gold	(Qatar) 2016 Doha	Boels–Dolmans; Ellen van Dijk (NED); Chantal Blaak (NED); Karol-Ann Canuel (CAN); Lizzie Deignan (GBR); Christine Majerus (LUX); Evelyn Stevens (USA)	Women's team time trial
Gold	(Qatar) 2016 Doha	Karlijn Swinkels	Women's junior time trial
Silver	(Qatar) 2016 Doha	Ellen van Dijk	Women's time trial
Silver	(Qatar) 2016 Doha	Kirsten Wild	Women's road race
Gold	(Norway) 2017 Bergen	Team Sunweb; Lucinda Brand (NED); Leah Kirchmann (CAN); Floortje Mackaij (NED); Coryn Rivera (USA); Sabrina Stultiens (NED); Ellen van Dijk (NED)	Women's team time trial
Gold	(Norway) 2017 Bergen	Annemiek van Vleuten	Women's time trial
Gold	(Norway) 2017 Bergen	Tom Dumoulin	Men's time trial
Gold	(Norway) 2017 Bergen	Chantal Blaak	Women's road race
Silver	(Norway) 2017 Bergen	Boels–Dolmans; Chantal Blaak (NED); Karol-Ann Canuel (CAN); Megan Guarnier (USA); Christine Majerus (LUX); Amy Pieters (NED); Anna van der Breggen (NED)	Women's team time trial
Silver	(Norway) 2017 Bergen	Anna van der Breggen	Women's time trial
Gold	(Austria) 2018 Innsbruck	Annemiek van Vleuten	Women's time trial
Gold	(Austria) 2018 Innsbruck	Anna van der Breggen	Women's road race
Gold	(Austria) 2018 Innsbruck	Rozemarijn Ammerlaan	Women's junior time trial
Silver	(Austria) 2018 Innsbruck	Tom Dumoulin	Men's time trial
Silver	(Austria) 2018 Innsbruck	Anna van der Breggen	Women's time trial
Silver	(Austria) 2018 Innsbruck	(Netherlands) Boels–Dolmans; Chantal Blaak (NED); Karol-Ann Canuel (CAN); Amalie Dideriksen (DEN); Christine Majerus (LUX); Amy Pieters (NED); Anna van der Breggen (NED)	Women's team time trial
Bronze	(Austria) 2018 Innsbruck	(Netherlands) Team Sunweb; Lucinda Brand (NED); Ellen van Dijk (NED); Leah Kirchmann (CAN); Liane Lippert (GER); Pernille Mathiesen (DEN); Coryn Rivera (USA)	Women's team time trial
Bronze	(Austria) 2018 Innsbruck	Ellen van Dijk	Women's time trial
Gold	(United Kingdom) 2019 Yorkshire	Lucinda Brand; Riejanne Markus; Amy Pieters; Koen Bouwman; Bauke Mollema; Jos van Emden	Mixed team relay
Silver	(United Kingdom) 2019 Yorkshire	Shirin van Anrooij	Women's junior time trial
Silver	(United Kingdom) 2019 Yorkshire	Enzo Leijnse	Men's junior time trial
Silver	(United Kingdom) 2019 Yorkshire	Anna van der Breggen	Women's time trial
Bronze	(United Kingdom) 2019 Yorkshire	Annemiek van Vleuten	Women's time trial
Bronze	(United Kingdom) 2019 Yorkshire	Lieke Nooijen	Junior Women's road race
Gold	(United Kingdom) 2019 Yorkshire	Annemiek van Vleuten	Women's road race
Silver	(United Kingdom) 2019 Yorkshire	Anna van der Breggen	Women's road race
Gold	(Italy) 2020 Imola	Anna van der Breggen	Women's time trial
Gold	(Italy) 2020 Imola	Anna van der Breggen	Women's road race
Silver	(Italy) 2020 Imola	Annemiek van Vleuten	Women's road race
Bronze	(Italy) 2020 Imola	Ellen van Dijk	Women's time trial
Gold	(Belgium) 2021 Flanders	Ellen van Dijk	Women's time trial
Silver	(Belgium) 2021 Flanders	Dylan van Baarle	Men's road race
Silver	(Belgium) 2021 Flanders	Marianne Vos	Women's road race
Silver	(Belgium) 2021 Flanders	Annemiek van Vleuten; Ellen van Dijk; Riejanne Markus; Koen Bouwman; Bauke Mollema; Jos van Emden	Mixed team relay
Bronze	(Belgium) 2021 Flanders	Annemiek van Vleuten	Women's time trial
Bronze	(Belgium) 2021 Flanders	Olav Kooij	Men's under-23 road race
Gold	(Australia) 2022 Wollongong	Ellen van Dijk	Women's time trial
Gold	(Australia) 2022 Wollongong	Annemiek van Vleuten	Women's road race
Silver	(Australia) 2022 Wollongong	Shirin van Anrooij	Women's under-23 time trial
Bronze	(Australia) 2022 Wollongong	Nienke Vinke	Women's junior road race
Gold	(United Kingdom) 2023 Glasgow	Mathieu van der Poel	Men's road race
Silver	(United Kingdom) 2023 Glasgow	Demi Vollering	Women's road race
Gold	(Switzerland) 2024 Zürich	Puck Pieterse	Women's under-23 road race
Silver	(Switzerland) 2024 Zürich	Demi Vollering	Women's time trial
Bronze	(Switzerland) 2024 Zürich	Mathieu van der Poel	Men's road race
Bronze	(Switzerland) 2024 Zürich	Senna Remijn	Men's junior road race

=== Team time trial medalists ===
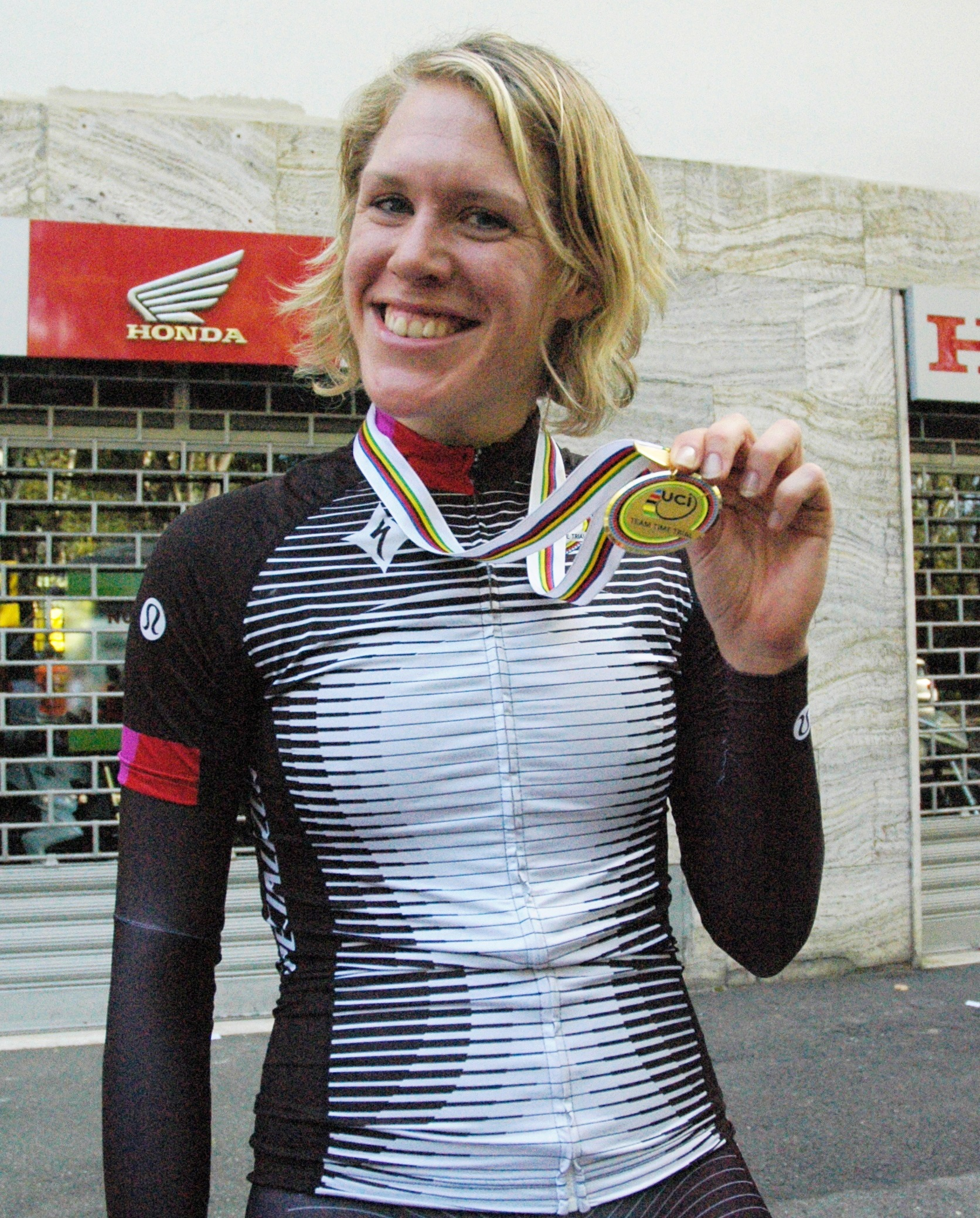
Ellen van Dijk showing her gold medal after the women's team time trial in 2013.

Since the 2012 UCI Road World Championships there is the men's and women's team time trial event for trade teams and these medals are included under the UCI registration country of the team. Here are listed of the medalists who won a medal with a non-Dutch based team.

Medal	Championship	Name	Team	Event
Gold	(Netherlands) 2012 Valkenburg	Ellen van Dijk	(Germany) Team Specialized–lululemon	Women's team time trial
Gold	(Netherlands) 2012 Valkenburg	Niki Terpstra	(Belgium) Omega Pharma–Quick-Step	Men's team time trial
Silver	(Netherlands) 2012 Valkenburg	Loes Gunnewijk	(Australia) Orica–AIS	Women's team time trial
Bronze	(Netherlands) 2012 Valkenburg	Sebastian Langeveld; Jens Mouris	(Australia) Orica–GreenEDGE	Men's team time trial
Gold	(Italy) 2013 Tuscany	Ellen van Dijk	(United States) Specialized–lululemon	Women's team time trial
Gold	(Italy) 2013 Tuscany	Niki Terpstra	(Belgium) Omega Pharma–Quick-Step	Men's team time trial
Silver	(Italy) 2013 Tuscany	Jens Mouris	(Australia) Orica–GreenEDGE	Men's team time trial
Bronze	(Italy) 2012 Tuscany	Loes Gunnewijk	(Australia) Orica–AIS	Women's team time trial
Gold	(Spain) 2014 Ponferrada	Chantal Blaak	(United States) Specialized–lululemon	Women's team time trial
Silver	(Spain) 2014 Ponferrada	Jens Mouris	(Australia) Orica–GreenEDGE	Men's team time trial
Bronze	(Spain) 2014 Ponferrada	Niki Terpstra	(Belgium) Omega Pharma–Quick-Step	Men's team time trial
Silver	(United States) 2015 Richmond	Niki Terpstra	(Belgium) Etixx–Quick-Step	Men's team time trial
Gold	(Qatar) 2016 Doha	Niki Terpstra	(Belgium) Etixx–Quick-Step	Men's team time trial
Gold	(Norway) 2017 Bergen	Tom Dumoulin; Wilco Kelderman; Sam Oomen	(Germany) Team Sunweb	Men's team time trial
Gold	(Austria) 2018 Innsbruck	Niki Terpstra	(Belgium) Quick-Step Floors	Men's team time trial
Silver	(Austria) 2018 Innsbruck	Tom Dumoulin; Wilco Kelderman; Sam Oomen	(Germany) Team Sunweb	Men's team time trial

== Most successful Dutch competitors ==
Name	Medals	Championships
Ellen van Dijk	7 gold, 3 silver, 4 bronze	(bronze) 2004 Verona – Women's junior road race (gold) 2012 Valkenburg – Women's team time trial (gold) 2013 Tuscany – Women's team time trial (gold) 2013 Tuscany – Women's time trial (silver) 2015 Richmond – Women's team time trial (gold) 2016 Doha – Women's team time trial (silver) 2016 Doha – Women's time trial (gold) 2017 Bergen – Women's team time trial (bronze) 2018 Innsbruck – Women's time trial (bronze) 2018 Innsbruck – Women's team time trial (bronze) 2020 Imola – Women's time trial (gold) 2021 Flanders – Women's time trial (silver) 2021 Flanders – Mixed team relay (gold) 2022 Wollongong – Women's time trial
Leontien van Moorsel	5 gold, 1 silver, 0 bronze	(gold) 1990 Utsunomiya – Women's team time trial (gold) 1991 Stuttgart – Women's road race (gold) 1993 Oslo – Women's road race (gold) 1998 Valkenburg – Women's road race (silver) 1998 Valkenburg – Women's time trial (gold) 1999 Verona – Women's time trial
Marianne Vos	4 gold, 7 silver, 0 bronze	(gold) 2004 Verona – Women's junior road race (silver) 2005 Salzburg – Women's junior road race (gold) 2006 Salzburg – Women's road race (silver) 2007 Stuttgart – Women's road race (silver) 2008 Varese – Women's road race (silver) 2009 Mendrisio – Women's road race (silver) 2010 Geelong and Melbourne – Women's road race (silver) 2011 Copenhagen – Women's road race (gold) 2012 Valkenburg – Women's road race (silver) 2013 Tuscany – Women's team time trial (gold) 2013 Tuscany – Women's road race (silver) 2021 Flanders – Women's road race
Annemiek van Vleuten	4 gold, 3 silver, 1 bronze	(silver) 2013 Tuscany – Women's team time trial (gold) 2017 Bergen – Women's time trial (gold) 2018 Innsbruck – Women's time trial (bronze) 2019 Yorkshire – Women's time trial (gold) 2019 Yorkshire – Women's road race (silver) 2020 Imola – Women's road race (silver) 2021 Flanders – Mixed team relay (gold) 2022 Wollongong – Women's road race
Anna van der Breggen	3 gold, 6 silver, 0 bronze	(silver) 2015 Richmond – Women's time trial (silver) 2015 Richmond – Women's road race (silver) 2017 Bergen – Women's time trial (gold) 2018 Innsbruck – Women's road race (silver) 2018 Innsbruck – Women's time trial (silver) 2019 Harrogate – Women's road race (silver) 2019 Harrogate – Women's time trial (gold) 2020 Imola – Women's road race (gold) 2020 Imola – Women's time trial
Niki Terpstra	3 gold, 1 silver, 1 bronze	(gold) 2012 Valkenburg – Men's team time trial (gold) 2013 Tuscany – Men's team time trial (bronze) 2014 Ponferrada – Men's team time trial (silver) 2015 Richmond – Men's team time trial (gold) 2016 Doha – Men's team time trial
Keetie van Oosten-Hage	2 gold, 3 silver, 3 bronze	(silver) 1966 Nürburgring – Women's road race (gold) 1968 Imola – Women's road race (bronze) 1971 Mendrisio – Women's road race (silver) 1973 Barcelona – Women's road race (bronze) 1974 Montreal – Women's road race (bronze) 1975 Mettet and Yvoir – Women's road race (gold) 1976 Ostuni – Women's road race (silver) 1978 Nürburgring – Women's road race
Tom Cordes	2 gold, 0 silver, 0 bronze	(gold) 1984 Beuvron – Men's junior road race (gold) 1986 Colorado Springs – Men's team time trial

== Medal table ==
=== Medals by year ===
Championship	Gold	Silver	Bronze	Total	Rank
(Netherlands) 1925 Apeldoorn	0	0	1	1	
(France) 1933 Montlhéry	0	0	1	1	
(Germany) 1934 Leipzig	1	0	0	1	
(Switzerland) 1936 Bern	0	0	1	1	
(Netherlands) 1938 Valkenburg	0	0	1	1	
(France) 1947 Reims	1	0	2	3	
(Denmark) 1949 Copenhagen	1	0	1	2	
(Belgium) 1950 Moorslede	0	1	0	1	
(Italy) 1951 Varese	0	0	1	1	
(Germany) 1954 Sollingen	0	0	1	1	
(Denmark) 1956 Copenhagen	1	0	2	3	
(Belgium) 1957 Waregem	0	0	1	1	
(Netherlands) 1959 Zandvoort	0	0	1	1	
(Italy) 1962 Salo	0	0	1	1	
(Belgium) 1963 Ronse	0	0	1	1	
(France) 1964 Sallanches	1	0	0	1	
(Germany) 1966 Nürburgring	1	2	0	3	
(Netherlands) 1967 Heerlen	0	1	1	2	
(Italy) 1968 Imola	1	0	0	1	
(Belgium) 1969 Zolder	1	0	0	1	
(United Kingdom) 1970 Leicester	0	0	1	1	
(Switzerland) 1971 Mendrisio	0	1	1	2	
(Spain) 1973 Barcelona	0	1	0	1	
(Canada) 1974 Montreal	0	0	1	1	
(Belgium) 1975 Mettet and Yvoir	3	0	1	4	
(Switzerland) 1975 Lausanne	0	1	0	1	
(Italy) 1976 Ostuni	1	0	0	1	
(Venezuela) 1977 San Cristóbal	0	0	1	1	
(Germany) 1978 Nürburgring	2	1	0	3	
(Netherlands) 1979 Valkenburg	2	0	0	2	
(United Kingdom) 1982 Goodwood	1	0	0	1	
(Switzerland) 1983 Altenrhein	0	1	0	1	6
(France) 1984 Beuvron	1	0	0	1	
(Italy) 1985 Giavera del Montello	1	0	0	1	1
(Germany) 1985 Stuttgart	1	0	0	1	
(United States) 1986 Colorado Springs	1	1	1	3	1
(Morocco) 1986 Casablanca	1	1	0	2	
(Italy) 1987 Bergamo	0	1	1	2	
(Austria) 1987 Villach	0	1	1	2	5
(Denmark) 1988 Odense	0	1	0	1	
(Japan) 1990 Utsunomiya	1	0	0	1	5
(United Kingdom) 1990 Middlesbrough	0	0	1	1	
(Germany) 1991 Stuttgart	1	2	0	3	2
(United States) 1991 Colorado Springs	1	0	0	1	
(Greece) 1992 Olympia	0	0	1	1	
(Norway) 1993 Oslo	1	0	0	1	4
(Colombia) 1995 Bogotá	1	0	0	1	3
(Spain) 1997 San Sebastián	1	0	1	2	4
(Netherlands) 1998 Valkenburg	1	1	0	2	4
(Italy) 1999 Verona	1	0	0	1	6
(France) 2000 Plouay	0	1	1	2	10
(Portugal) 2001 Lisbon	0	2	1	3	9
(Belgium) 2002 Limburg	1	0	0	1	4
(Canada) 2003 Hamilton	2	3	2	7	1
(Italy) 2004 Verona	1	2	1	4	3
(Austria) 2006 Salzburg	1	0	0	1	4
(Germany) 2007 Stuttgart	1	1	1	3	2
(Italy) 2008 Varese	0	1	0	1	6
(Switzerland) 2009 Mendrisio	0	1	0	1	7
(Australia) 2010 Geelong and Melbourne	0	1	0	1	8
(Denmark) 2011 Copenhagen	0	1	1	2	9
(Netherlands) 2012 Valkenburg	1	0	2	3	6
(Italy) 2013 Tuscany	3	1	0	4	1
(Spain) 2014 Ponferrada	0	0	2	2	13
(United States) 2015 Richmond	0	3	1	4	10
(Qatar) 2016 Doha	2	2	0	4	3
(Norway) 2017 Bergen	4	2	0	6	1
(Austria) 2018 Innsbruck	3	3	2	8	1
(United Kingdom) 2019 Yorkshire	2	4	2	8	2
(Italy) 2020 Imola	2	1	1	4	1
(Belgium) 2021 Flanders	1	3	2	6	3
(Australia) 2022 Wollongong	2	1	1	4	2
(United Kingdom) 2023 Glasgow	1	2	0	3	4
Total	57	52	47	156	

=== Medals by discipline ===
updated after 29 September of the 2019 UCI Road World Championships

Event	Gold	Silver	Bronze	Total	Rank
Men's road race	7	4	6	17	4
Men's time trial	1	1	2	4	6
Men's team time trial	3	2	1	6	4
Women's road race	12	15	5	32	1
Women's time trial	5	5	2	12	2
Women's team time trial	1	3	2	6	
Men's under-23 road race	0	1	1	2	14
Men's under-23 time trial	1	2	0	3	6
Men's junior road race	4	4	2	10	
Men's junior time trial	0	1	1	2	
Women's junior road race	5	3	4	12	1
Women's junior time trial	0	2	3	5	
Men's amateur road race	6	1	12	19	
Men's junior team time trial	0	0	1	1	

== See also ==
Netherlands at other UCI events

- Netherlands at the UCI Track Cycling World Championships
- Netherlands at the UCI Track Cycling World Cup Classics
