= 2019 UCI Road World Championships – Women's time trial =

Women's time trial
2019 UCI Road World Championships

Race details
- Dates: 24 September 2019
- Stages: 1
- Distance: 30.3 km (18.8 mi)
- Winning time: 42' 12"

Medalists
	Gold	(United States) Chloé Dygert Owen (USA)
	Silver	(Netherlands) Anna van der Breggen (NED)
	Bronze	(Netherlands) Annemiek van Vleuten (NED)

The Women's time trial of the 2019 UCI Road World Championships was a cycling event that took place on 24 September 2019 in Harrogate, England. It was the 26th edition of the event, for which Dutch rider Annemiek van Vleuten was the defending champion, having won in 2018. 53 riders from 33 nations entered the competition.

Dygert Owen finished over a minute and a half ahead of the previous year's runner-up Anna van der Breggen, who finished second for the third year in a row. Defending champion Annemiek van Vleuten finished third at a further twenty seconds slower than van der Breggen.

== Qualification ==
All National Federations were allowed to enter four riders for the race, with a maximum of two riders to start. In addition to this number, the outgoing World Champion and the current continental champions were also able to take part.

Champion	Name	Note
Outgoing World Champion	Annemiek van Vleuten (NED)	Competed
Pan American Champion	Chloé Dygert Owen (USA)	Competed
Asian Champion	Olga Zabelinskaya (UZB)	Competed
African Champion	Selam Ahama Gebrefiel (ETH)	Did not compete
European Champion	Ellen van Dijk (NED)	Did not compete
Oceanian Champion	Kate Perry (AUS)	Did not compete

=== Participating nations ===
53 cyclists from 33 nations took part in the women's time trial. The number of cyclists per nation is shown in parentheses.

- Argentina (1)
- Australia (1)
- Austria (1)
- Belarus (2)
- Belgium (1)
- Brazil (1)
- Canada (2)
- Denmark (2)
- Eritrea (1)
- France (2)
- Germany (2)
- Great Britain (2)
- Iceland (1)
- Ireland (2)
- Israel (2)
- Italy (2)
- Japan (1)
- Kuwait (2)
- Mexico (1)
- Netherlands (3)
- Norway (2)
- Paraguay (1)
- Poland (1)
- Russia (2)
- South Africa (2)
- Spain (2)
- Sweden (1)
- Switzerland (2)
- Taiwan (1)
- Trinidad and Tobago (1)
- Ukraine (2)
- United States (3)
- Uzbekistan (1)

== Final classification ==
Rank	Rider	Country	Time
1st place, gold medalist(s)	Chloé Dygert Owen	United States	42' 12"
2nd place, silver medalist(s)	Anna van der Breggen	Netherlands	+ 1' 32"
3rd place, bronze medalist(s)	Annemiek van Vleuten	Netherlands	+ 1' 52"
4	Amber Neben	United States	+ 2' 38"
5	Lisa Klein	Germany	+ 2' 40"
6	Marlen Reusser	Switzerland	+ 3' 02"
7	Leah Thomas	United States	+ 3' 12"
8	Lucinda Brand	Netherlands	+ 3' 15"
9	Alena Amialiusik	Belarus	+ 3' 17"
10	Lisa Brennauer	Germany	+ 3' 19"
11	Amanda Spratt	Australia	+ 3' 57"
12	Karol-Ann Canuel	Canada	+ 4' 23"
13	Omer Shapira	Israel	+ 4' 29"
14	Lisa Nordén	Sweden	+ 4' 31"
15	Juliette Labous	France	+ 4' 32"
16	Alice Barnes	United Kingdom	+ 4' 32"
17	Elisa Longo Borghini	Italy	+ 4' 35"
18	Pernille Mathiesen	Denmark	+ 4' 36"
19	Anastasia Chursina	Russia	+ 4' 37"
20	Anna Kiesenhofer	Austria	+ 4' 39"
21	Vita Heine	Norway	+ 4' 57"
22	Elise Chabbey	Switzerland	+ 5' 09"
23	Louise Hansen	Denmark	+ 5' 15"
24	Kelly Murphy	Ireland	+ 5' 32"
25	Tatsiana Sharakova	Belarus	+ 5' 33"
26	Hayley Simmonds	United Kingdom	+ 5' 35"
27	Olga Zabelinskaya	Uzbekistan	+ 5' 42"
28	Olga Shekel	Ukraine	+ 5' 52"
29	Eri Yonamine	Japan	+ 5' 54"
30	Audrey Cordon-Ragot	France	+ 5' 56"
31	Katrine Aalerud	Norway	+ 6' 00"
32	Ashleigh Moolman	South Africa	+ 6' 15"
33	Julie van de Velde	Belgium	+ 6' 22"
34	Anna Turvey	Ireland	+ 6' 22"
35	Vittoria Bussi	Italy	+ 6' 28"
36	Anna Plichta	Poland	+ 6' 33"
37	Rotem Gafinovitz	Israel	+ 6' 52"
38	Teniel Campbell	Trinidad and Tobago	+ 7' 17"
39	Gloria Rodríguez	Spain	+ 7' 18"
40	Tiffany Keep	South Africa	+ 7' 18"
41	Lourdes Oyarbide	Spain	+ 7' 52"
42	Gillian Ellsay	Canada	+ 7' 59"
43	Andrea Ramírez	Mexico	+ 8' 33"
44	Maria Novolodskaya	Russia	+ 8' 38"
45	Desiet Kidane	Eritrea	+ 8' 38"
46	Valeriya Kononenko	Ukraine	+ 8' 55"
47	Agua Marina Espínola	Paraguay	+ 9' 09"
48	Fernanda Yapura	Argentina	+ 9' 11"
49	Agusta Edda Bjornsdóttir	Iceland	+ 9' 39"
50	Ting Ting Chang	Taiwan	+ 10' 11"
51	Ana Paula Polegatch	Brazil	+ 10' 29"
52	Latefa Alyaseen	Kuwait	+ 19' 37"
53	Noura Alomairi	Kuwait	+ 20' 29"
