= 2020 UCI Road World Championships – Women's time trial =

Cycling race

Women's time trial
2020 UCI Road World Championships

Race details
- Dates: 24 September 2020
- Stages: 1
- Distance: 31.7 km (19.7 mi)
- Winning time: 40' 20"

Medalists
	Gold	(Netherlands) Anna van der Breggen (NED)
	Silver	(Switzerland) Marlen Reusser (SUI)
	Bronze	(Netherlands) Ellen van Dijk (NED)

The Women's time trial of the 2020 UCI Road World Championships was a cycling event that took place on 24 September 2020 in Imola, Italy. Chloé Dygert was the defending champion. The race was won by Anna van der Breggen of the Netherlands, with Marlen Reusser finishing second, and Ellen van Dijk finishing third. Dygert had recorded the fastest time to the intermediate timing point, but did not finish the race, after crashing over a guardrail and down an embankment.

The event took place on a 31.7 kilometres (19.7 mi) flat course, starting from the Autodromo Internazionale Enzo e Dino Ferrari (a motor racing circuit) before turning at Borgo Tossignano to return to the finish line at the Autodromo.

== Final classification ==
51 cyclists were listed to start the 31.7-kilometre (19.7 mi)-long course.

Rank	Rider	Country	Time
1st place, gold medalist(s)	Anna van der Breggen	Netherlands	40' 20"
2nd place, silver medalist(s)	Marlen Reusser	Switzerland	+ 15"
3rd place, bronze medalist(s)	Ellen van Dijk	Netherlands	+ 31"
4	Lisa Brennauer	Germany	+ 45"
5	Grace Brown	Australia	+ 1' 01"
6	Amber Neben	United States	+ 1' 20"
7	Emma Cecilie Norsgaard	Denmark	+ 1' 22"
8	Mieke Kröger	Germany	+ 1' 31"
9	Lauren Stephens	United States	+ 1' 43"
10	Vittoria Bussi	Italy	+ 1' 46"
11	Audrey Cordon-Ragot	France	+ 1' 53"
12	Georgia Williams	New Zealand	+ 2' 16"
13	Eugenia Bujak	Slovenia	+ 2' 20"
14	Anna Plichta	Poland	+ 2' 21"
15	Lizzy Banks	United Kingdom	+ 2' 23"
16	Alena Amialiusik	Belarus	+ 2' 28"
17	Juliette Labous	France	+ 2' 30"
18	Anna Kiesenhofer	Austria	+ 2' 30"
19	Alice Barnes	United Kingdom	+ 2' 33"
20	Mikayla Harvey	New Zealand	+ 2' 33"
21	Leah Kirchmann	Canada	+ 2' 34"
22	Karol-Ann Canuel	Canada	+ 2' 46"
23	Arlenis Sierra	Cuba	+ 2' 46"
24	Lisa Nordén	Sweden	+ 2' 52"
25	Vittoria Guazzini	Italy	+ 2' 56"
26	Valeriya Kononenko	Ukraine	+ 3' 15"
27	Aigul Gareeva	Russia	+ 3' 38"
28	Claire Faber	Luxembourg	+ 3' 45"
29	Dana Rožlapa	Latvia	+ 3' 48"
30	Rotem Gafinovitz	Israel	+ 3' 51"
31	Eri Yonamine	Japan	+ 4' 08"
32	Pernille Mathiesen	Denmark	+ 4' 22"
33	Sara Van de Vel	Belgium	+ 4' 23"
34	Ann-Sophie Duyck	Belgium	+ 4' 46"
35	Olga Shekel	Ukraine	+ 4' 53"
36	Teniel Campbell	Trinidad and Tobago	+ 5' 32"
37	Lourdes Oyarbide	Spain	+ 5' 44"
38	Catalina Soto	Chile	+ 5' 54"
39	Sara Martín	Spain	+ 6' 31"
40	Fernanda Yapura	Argentina	+ 6' 34"
41	Tereza Korvasová	Czech Republic	+ 7' 23"
42	Agusta Edda Bjornsdóttir	Iceland	+ 7' 24"
43	Jarmila Machačová	Czech Republic	+ 7' 25"
44	Kerry Jonker	South Africa	+ 7' 49"
45	Akvilė Gedraitytė	Lithuania	+ 8' 58"
46	Margrét Pálsdóttir	Iceland	+ 9' 39"
47	Amber Joseph	Barbados	+ 10' 15"
48	Eyeru Tesfoam Gebru	Ethiopia	+ 10' 59"
49	Siham Es Sad	Morocco	+ 14' 07"
	Chloé Dygert	United States	DNF
	Olga Zabelinskaya	Uzbekistan	DNS
