= 2019 UCI Road World Championships – Women's road race =

Cycling race

Women's road race
2019 UCI Road World Championships
- Rainbow jersey

Race details
- Dates: 28 September 2019
- Stages: 1 in Harrogate, England
- Distance: 149.4 km (92.8 mi)
- Winning time: 4h 06' 05"

Medalists
	Gold	(Netherlands) Annemiek van Vleuten (NED)
	Silver	(Netherlands) Anna van der Breggen (NED)
	Bronze	(Australia) Amanda Spratt (AUS)

The Women's road race of the 2019 UCI Road World Championships was a cycling event that took place on 28 September 2019 in Yorkshire, England. It started in Bradford and finished in Harrogate, after three laps in Harrogate.

Dutch cyclist Annemiek van Vleuten won the race, after a solo breakaway for more than 100 kilometres (62 miles). Defending champion Anna van der Breggen, also of the Netherlands, finished as runner-up, with Australian cyclist Amanda Spratt finishing in third.

== Qualification ==
=== Participating nations ===
152 cyclists from 49 nations were entered in the women's road race, however Luxembourg's Anne-Sophie Harsch did not start the event. The number of cyclists per nation is shown in parentheses.

- Argentina (1)
- Australia (7)
- Austria (2)
- Belgium (5)
- Belarus (3)
- Brazil (2)
- Canada (6)
- Chile (1)
- Colombia (3)
- Costa Rica (1)
- Croatia (2)
- Cuba (2)
- Czech Republic (3)
- Denmark (5)
- Eritrea (1)
- Estonia (1)
- France (6)
- Great Britain (6)
- Germany (6)
- Greece (1)
- Iceland (1)
- Ireland (1)
- Israel (2)
- Italy (7)
- Japan (2)
- Kazakhstan (2)
- Kuwait (2)
- Lithuania (1)
- Luxembourg (~~3~~ 2)
- Macau (1)
- Mexico (4)
- Netherlands (8)
- New Zealand (2)
- Norway (5)
- Paraguay (1)
- Poland (7)
- Portugal (1)
- South Africa (4)
- Spain (6)
- Russia (3)
- Slovakia (2)
- Slovenia (3)
- Sweden (5)
- Switzerland (2)
- Trinidad and Tobago (2)
- Ukraine (2)
- Uruguay (1)
- United States (7)
- Zimbabwe (1)

== Final classification ==
Of the race's 152 entrants, 88 riders completed the full distance of 149.4 kilometres (92.8 mi).

Rank	Rider	Country	Time
1	Annemiek van Vleuten	Netherlands	4h 06' 05"
2	Anna van der Breggen	Netherlands	+ 2' 15"
3	Amanda Spratt	Australia	+ 2' 28"
4	Chloé Dygert Owen	United States	+ 3' 24"
5	Elisa Longo Borghini	Italy	+ 4' 45"
6	Marianne Vos	Netherlands	+ 5' 20"
7	Marta Bastianelli	Italy	+ 5' 20"
8	Ashleigh Moolman	South Africa	+ 5' 20"
9	Lisa Brennauer	Germany	+ 5' 20"
10	Coryn Rivera	United States	+ 5' 20"
11	Christine Majerus	Luxembourg	+ 5' 20"
12	Arlenis Sierra	Cuba	+ 5' 20"
13	Amalie Dideriksen	Denmark	+ 5' 20"
14	Sofie De Vuyst	Belgium	+ 5' 20"
15	Emilia Fahlin	Sweden	+ 5' 20"
16	Alison Jackson	Canada	+ 5' 20"
17	Audrey Cordon-Ragot	France	+ 5' 20"
18	Alena Amialiusik	Belarus	+ 5' 20"
19	Amy Pieters	Netherlands	+ 5' 20"
20	Paula Patiño	Colombia	+ 5' 20"
21	Elise Chabbey	Switzerland	+ 5' 20"
22	Anna Henderson	United Kingdom	+ 5' 20"
23	Katarzyna Niewiadoma	Poland	+ 5' 20"
24	Elena Cecchini	Italy	+ 5' 20"
25	Margarita Victoria García	Spain	+ 5' 20"
26	Ane Santesteban	Spain	+ 5' 20"
27	Chloe Hosking	Australia	+ 5' 20"
28	Lucinda Brand	Netherlands	+ 5' 20"
29	Susanne Andersen	Norway	+ 5' 20"
30	Cecilie Uttrup Ludwig	Denmark	+ 5' 20"
31	Lizzie Deignan	United Kingdom	+ 5' 20"
32	Tatiana Guderzo	Italy	+ 5' 20"
33	Floortje Mackaij	Netherlands	+ 5' 20"
34	Marlen Reusser	Switzerland	+ 5' 31"
35	Eider Merino Cortazar	Spain	+ 5' 31"
36	Aude Biannic	France	+ 5' 31"
37	Nikola Nosková	Czech Republic	+ 5' 31"
38	Leah Thomas	United States	+ 5' 31"
39	Brodie Chapman	Australia	+ 5' 31"
40	Katrine Aalerud	Norway	+ 5' 36"
41	Lucy Kennedy	Australia	+ 5' 38"
42	Sara Poidevin	Canada	+ 5' 38"
43	Chantal Blaak	Netherlands	+ 5' 38"
44	Tayler Wiles	United States	+ 5' 38"
45	Eugenia Bujak	Slovenia	+ 5' 46"
46	Karol-Ann Canuel	Canada	+ 5' 51"
47	Elisa Balsamo	Italy	+ 5' 56"
48	Clara Koppenburg	Germany	+ 6' 25"
49	Lisa Klein	Germany	+ 6' 43"
50	Soraya Paladin	Italy	+ 7' 02"
51	Vita Heine	Norway	+ 8' 49"
52	Anastasia Chursina	Russia	+ 8' 55"
53	Maria Novolodskaya	Russia	+ 9' 02"
54	Tatsiana Sharakova	Belarus	+ 9' 51"
55	Olga Shekel	Ukraine	+ 9' 51"
56	Demi Vollering	Netherlands	+ 9' 51"
57	Lisa Nordén	Sweden	+ 9' 53"
58	Joanna van de Winkel	South Africa	+ 9' 53"
59	Ella Harris	New Zealand	+ 9' 53"
60	Omer Shapira	Israel	+ 9' 53"
61	Julie Leth	Denmark	+ 9' 53"
62	Hannah Barnes	United Kingdom	+ 9' 53"
63	Alice Barnes	United Kingdom	+ 9' 53"
64	Małgorzata Jasińska	Poland	+ 9' 53"
65	Juliette Labous	France	+ 9' 53"
66	Liane Lippert	Germany	+ 9' 53"
67	Ruth Winder	United States	+ 9' 53"
68	Pernille Mathiesen	Denmark	+ 9' 53"
69	Teniel Campbell	Trinidad and Tobago	+ 12' 55"
70	Franziska Koch	Germany	+ 12' 55"
71	Katie Hall	United States	+ 12' 55"
72	Anastasiya Kolesava	Belarus	+ 12' 55"
73	Kelly Van den Steen	Belgium	+ 12' 55"
74	Lourdes Oyarbide	Spain	+ 13' 50"
75	Angelika Tazreiter	Austria	+ 13' 50"
76	Letizia Paternoster	Italy	+ 13' 50"
77	Jesse Vandenbulcke	Belgium	+ 18' 08"
78	Jarmila Machačová	Czech Republic	+ 19' 13"
79	Marta Lach	Poland	+ 19' 55"
80	Nicola Juniper	United Kingdom	+ 23' 47"
81	Liliana Moreno	Colombia	+ 23' 47"
82	Monika Brzeźna	Poland	+ 23' 47"
83	Rasa Leleivytė	Lithuania	+ 23' 47"
84	Ariadna Gutiérrez	Mexico	+ 23' 47"
85	Séverine Eraud	France	+ 23' 47"
86	Eugénie Duval	France	+ 23' 47"
87	Brenda Santoyo	Mexico	+ 23' 47"
88	Évita Muzic	France	+ 23' 47"

Rank	Rider	Country	Time
	Tiffany Cromwell	Australia	DNF
	Diana Peñuela	Colombia	DNF
	Louise Hansen	Denmark	DNF
	Kathrin Hammes	Germany	DNF
	Jessica Allen	Australia	DNF
	Lauren Kitchen	Australia	DNF
	Leigh Ann Ganzar	United States	DNF
	Valerie Demey	Belgium	DNF
	Julie Van de Velde	Belgium	DNF
	Marie-Soleil Blais	Canada	DNF
	Gillian Ellsay	Canada	DNF
	Gabrielle Pilote Fortin	Canada	DNF
	Aurela Nerlo	Poland	DNF
	Anna Plichta	Poland	DNF
	Katarzyna Wilkos	Poland	DNF
	Lizzy Banks	United Kingdom	DNF
	Alicia González Blanco	Spain	DNF
	Sheyla Gutiérrez	Spain	DNF
	Tiffany Keep	South Africa	DNF
	Maroesjka Matthee	South Africa	DNF
	Stine Borgli	Norway	DNF
	Ingvild Gåskjenn	Norway	DNF
	Jeidi Pradera	Cuba	DNF
	Elise Maes	Luxembourg	DNF
	Anet Barrera	Mexico	DNF
	Andrea Ramírez	Mexico	DNF
	Clara Lundmark	Sweden	DNF
	Hanna Nilsson	Sweden	DNF
	Sara Penton	Sweden	DNF
	Urša Pintar	Slovenia	DNF
	Urška Žigart	Slovenia	DNF
	Hiromi Kaneko	Japan	DNF
	Eri Yonamine	Japan	DNF
	Valeriya Kononenko	Ukraine	DNF
	Elizaveta Oshurkova	Russia	DNF
	Desiet Kidane	Eritrea	DNF
	Mikayla Harvey	New Zealand	DNF
	Rotem Gafinovitz	Israel	DNF
	María José Vargas	Costa Rica	DNF
	Alexi Costa	Trinidad and Tobago	DNF
	Kathrin Schweinberger	Austria	DNF
	Denisse Ahumada	Chile	DNF
	Flávia Oliveira	Brazil	DNF
	Ana Paula Polegatch	Brazil	DNF
	Tereza Neumanová	Czech Republic	DNF
	Maja Perinović	Croatia	DNF
	Mia Radotić	Croatia	DNF
	Varvara Fasoi	Greece	DNF
	Alice Sharpe	Ireland	DNF
	Alžbeta Bačíková	Slovakia	DNF
	Tereza Medveďová	Slovakia	DNF
	Natalya Saifutdinova	Kazakhstan	DNF
	Makhabbat Umutzhanova	Kazakhstan	DNF
	Maria Martins	Portugal	DNF
	Ágústa Edda Björnsdóttir	Iceland	DNF
	Skye Davidson	Zimbabwe	DNF
	Mae Lang	Estonia	DNF
	Fabiana Granizal	Uruguay	DNF
	Anabel Yapura	Argentina	DNF
	Agua Marina Espínola	Paraguay	DNF
	Noura Alomairi	Kuwait	DNF
	Latefa Alyaseen	Kuwait	DNF
	Au Hoi Ian	Macau	DNF
	Anne-Sophie Harsch	Luxembourg	DNS
