= 2018 UCI Road World Championships – Women's time trial =

Women's time trial
2018 UCI Road World Championships
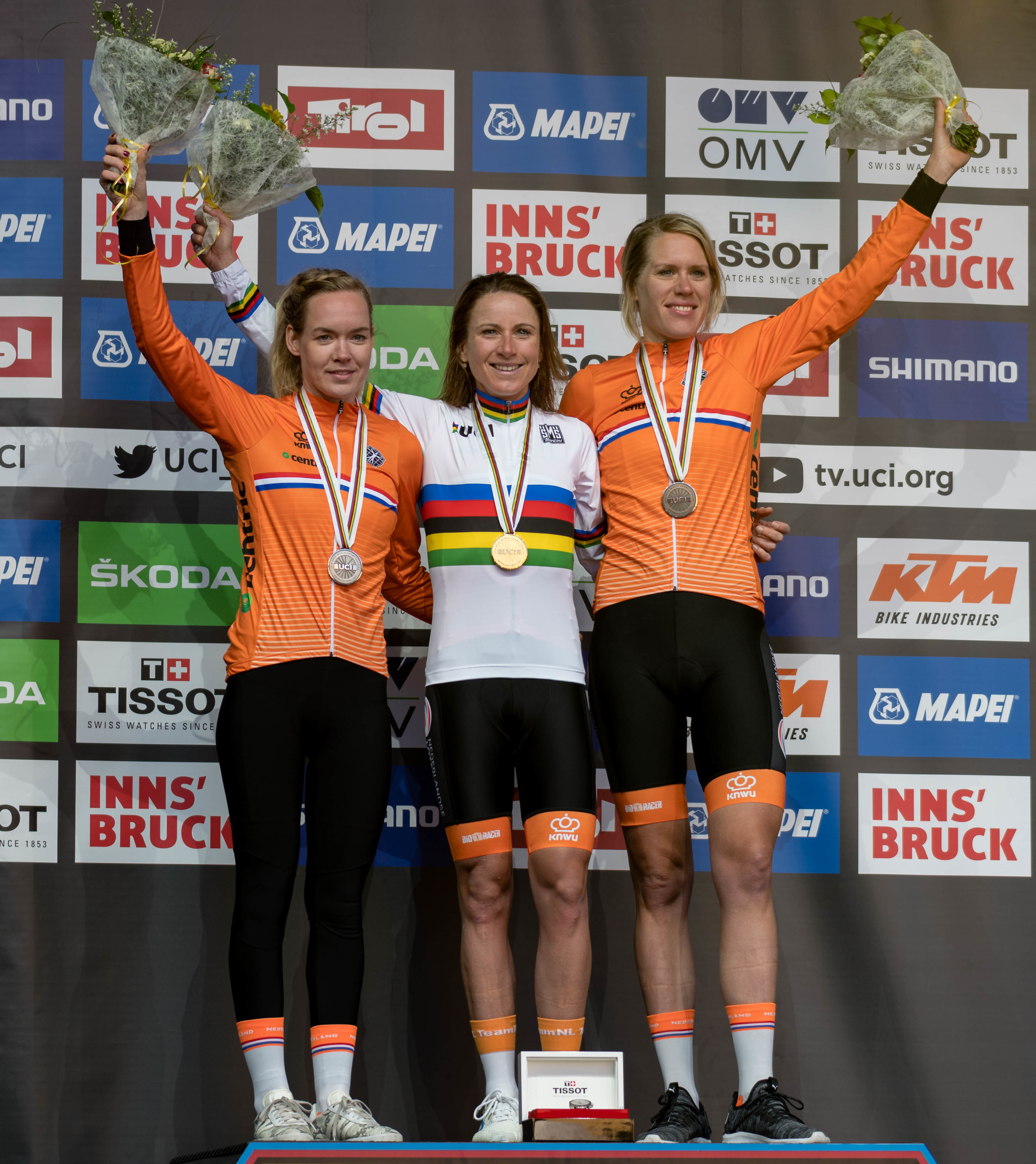

Race details
- Dates: 25 September 2018
- Stages: 1
- Distance: 27.7 km (17.2 mi)
- Winning time: 34' 25"

Medalists
	Gold	(Netherlands) Annemiek van Vleuten (NED)
	Silver	(Netherlands) Anna van der Breggen (NED)
	Bronze	(Netherlands) Ellen van Dijk (NED)

The Women's time trial of the 2018 UCI Road World Championships was a cycling event that took place on 25 September 2018 in Innsbruck, Austria. It was the 25th edition of the event, for which Dutch rider Annemiek van Vleuten was the defending champion, having won in 2017. 52 riders from 34 nations entered the competition.

Van Vleuten became the first rider since Judith Arndt in 2012 to defend the world time trial title, finishing almost half a minute clear of her nearest rival. Just as she did in 2017, Anna van der Breggen won the silver medal, while a Dutch clean sweep of the podium placings was completed by the European champion, Ellen van Dijk, a further 56.2 seconds behind van der Breggen.

== Qualification ==
All National Federations were allowed to enter four riders for the race, with a maximum of two riders to start. In addition to this number, the outgoing World Champion and the current continental champions were also able to take part.

Champion	Name	Note
Outgoing World Champion	Annemiek van Vleuten (NED)	Competed
African Champion	Mosana Debesay (ERI)	Competed
European Champion	Ellen van Dijk (NED)	Competed
Pan American Champion	Amber Neben (USA)	Competed
Oceanian Champion	Grace Brown (AUS)	Did not compete
Asian Champion	Lee Ju-mi (KOR)	Did not compete

=== Participating nations ===
52 cyclists from 34 nations took part in the women's time trial. The number of cyclists per nation is shown in parentheses.

- Argentina (1)
- Austria (2)
- Belarus (1)
- Belgium (1)
- Canada (2)
- China (1)
- Croatia (1)
- Cyprus (1)
- Czech Republic (1)
- Denmark (2)
- Eritrea (1)
- Ethiopia (1)
- Finland (1)
- France (2)
- Germany (2)
- Great Britain (2)
- Greece (1)
- Ireland (2)
- Israel (2)
- Italy (2)
- Japan (1)
- Kazakhstan (2)
- Netherlands (4)
- New Zealand (2)
- Norway (1)
- Paraguay (1)
- Russia (2)
- Slovakia (1)
- Spain (1)
- Sweden (1)
- Switzerland (1)
- Trinidad and Tobago (1)
- Ukraine (2)
- United States (3)

== Final classification ==
51 out of the race's 52 starters completed the 27.7-kilometre (17.2 mi)-long course.

Rank	Rider	Country	Time
1	Annemiek van Vleuten	Netherlands	34' 25"
2	Anna van der Breggen	Netherlands	+ 28"
3	Ellen van Dijk	Netherlands	+ 1' 25"
4	Leah Kirchmann	Canada	+ 1' 26"
5	Leah Thomas	United States	+ 1' 32"
6	Lucinda Brand	Netherlands	+ 1' 42"
7	Amber Neben	United States	+ 1' 47"
8	Karol-Ann Canuel	Canada	+ 2' 15"
9	Elisa Longo Borghini	Italy	+ 2' 17"
10	Tayler Wiles	United States	+ 2' 31"
11	Georgia Williams	New Zealand	+ 2' 33"
12	Pernille Mathiesen	Denmark	+ 2' 34"
13	Juliette Labous	France	+ 2' 39"
14	Lisa Brennauer	Germany	+ 2' 48"
15	Trixi Worrack	Germany	+ 3' 02"
16	Emilia Fahlin	Sweden	+ 3' 09"
17	Marlen Reusser	Switzerland	+ 3' 11"
18	Cecilie Uttrup Ludwig	Denmark	+ 3' 16"
19	Audrey Cordon	France	+ 3' 17"
20	Alena Amialiusik	Belarus	+ 3' 19"
21	Elena Pirrone	Italy	+ 3' 31"
22	Alice Barnes	United Kingdom	+ 3' 41"
23	Hayley Simmonds	United Kingdom	+ 3' 47"
24	Vita Heine	Norway	+ 3' 48"
25	Martina Ritter	Austria	+ 3' 51"
26	Lotta Lepistö	Finland	+ 3' 55"
27	Omer Shapira	Israel	+ 3' 59"
28	Ann-Sophie Duyck	Belgium	+ 3' 59"
29	Eri Yonamine	Japan	+ 4' 00"
30	Margarita Victoria García	Spain	+ 4' 09"
31	Olga Shekel	Ukraine	+ 4' 09"
32	Anastasiia Iakovenko	Russia	+ 4' 10"
33	Kelly Murphy	Ireland	+ 4' 19"
34	Anabel Yapura	Argentina	+ 4' 21"
35	Antri Christoforou	Cyprus	+ 4' 30"
36	Valeriya Kononenko	Ukraine	+ 4' 34"
37	Barbara Meyer	Austria	+ 4' 40"
38	Tereza Korvasová	Czech Republic	+ 5' 00"
39	Mia Radotić	Croatia	+ 5' 04"
40	Rotem Gafinovitz	Israel	+ 5' 09"
41	Eileen Burns	Ireland	+ 5' 10"
42	Maria Novolodskaya	Russia	+ 5' 25"
43	Natalya Saifutdinova	Kazakhstan	+ 5' 46"
44	Varvara Fasoi	Greece	+ 6' 08"
45	Faina Potapova	Kazakhstan	+ 6' 29"
46	Eyeru Tesfoam Gebru	Ethiopia	+ 6' 34"
47	Agua Marina Espínola	Paraguay	+ 6' 46"
48	Tatiana Jaseková	Slovakia	+ 6' 48"
49	Teniel Campbell	Trinidad and Tobago	+ 7' 18"
50	Mosana Debesay	Eritrea	+ 7' 32"
51	Pu Yixian	China	+ 7' 37"
DNF	Mikayla Harvey	New Zealand	-
