= Aad van den Hoek =

Dutch cyclist (born 1951)

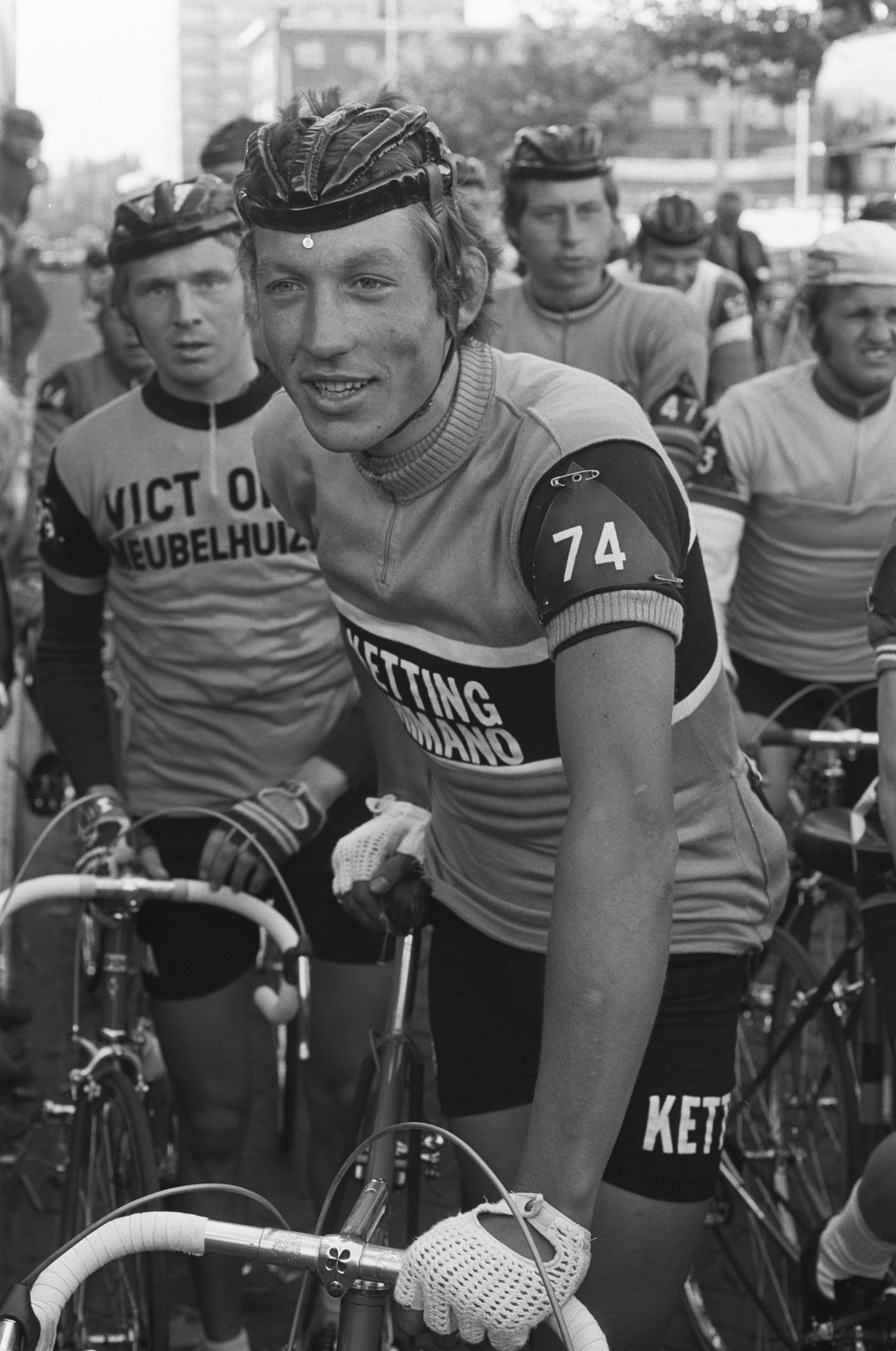
- Aad van den Hoek in 1974

Personal information
- Full name: Aad van den Hoek
- Born: 14 October 1951 (age 75) Dirksland, Netherlands
- Height: 1.86 m (6 ft 1 in)
- Weight: 77 kg (170 lb)

Cycling career
- Sport: Cycling
- Discipline: Road
- Role: Rider

Professional teams
- 1974–1982: TI-Raleigh
- 1983: Beckers Snacks

Aad van den Hoek (born 14 October 1951) is a former Dutch cyclist. He was professional between 1974 and 1983 and was good friends with Gerrie Knetemann. Together they won four Tour de France team time trial stages with their team TI-Raleigh. In 1976 he finished last in the general classification of the Tour de France and carried the Lanterne rouge.

== Biography ==
In 1971 Van den Hoek won silver at the 1971 UCI Road World Championships, in the team time trial, with teammates Fedor den Hertog, Adri Duyker and Frits Schür.

In 1972 he finished third in the 100 km team time trial at the Munich Olympics. 25 kilometers into the race, the Dutch had a lead of six seconds. After 40 km, a spoke snapped in Van den Hoek's back wheel, and Hennie Kuiper, Cees Priem and Fedor den Hertog went on without him. At the finish line they were only a minute and ten seconds behind. After the race Van den Hoek tested positive for Coramine, a drug allowed by the Union Cycliste Internationale but not the IOC. The whole Dutch team was disqualified.

Van den Hoek rode nine seasons for team TI-Raleigh, which was famous for its success in team time trials. Together with the team he won four TTTs in the Tour de Frances of 1976, 1978 and 1981 (twice). He ended those Tours in 87th and last, 57th and 115th place. In 1977 he was one of a group of 30 riders that were sent home after finishing beyond the time limit in the toughest mountain stage Chamonix - Alpe d'Huez. Among those riders were points classification second Rik van Linden, stage winners Klaus-Peter Thaler and Patrick Sercu, and his teammates Piet van Katwijk and Bill Nickson.

== Major results ==
1971
2nd 1971 UCI Road World Championships TTT
1972
Ronde van Midden-Nederland
Ronde van Gelderland
stage 1 Rund um Düren
stage 8 Tour of Austria
1973
2 stages (TTT/individually), points classification, 2nd overall Olympia's Tour
2 stages (TTT/individually) Milk Race
1974
Rheinland-Pfalz Rundfahrt
1 stage, points classification, 3rd overall Olympia's Tour
1975
Étoile des Espoirs
1976
stage 5a TTT Tour de France with TI-Raleigh
Acht van Chaam
2nd Dutch National Road Race Championships
1977
7th stage Part B Route du Sol
1978
stage 4 TTT Tour de France with TI-Raleigh
1st leg Part B Tour of the Netherlands
1979
stage 1 Deutschland Tour
1981
stages 1b and 4 TTTs Tour de France with TI-Raleigh
stage 2b Volta a Catalunya

== See also ==
- List of Dutch Olympic cyclists
- List of doping cases in cycling
