= Kerry Jonker =

Australian cyclist

Personal information
- Full name: Kerry Jonker
- Born: 21 May 1996 (age 30) Cape Town, South Africa

Cycling career
- Sport: Cycling
- Current team: Hitec Products–Fluid Control
- Discipline: Road
- Role: Rider

Amateur teams
- 2017: St Kilda Cycling Club
- 2018: CBR Women
- 2019–2020: Isorex CT

Professional teams
- 2021: Macogep Tornatech Girondins de Bordeaux
- 2022: Andy Schleck–CP NVST–Immo Losch
- 2023–: Team Coop–Hitec Products

Kerry Jonker (born 21 May 1996) is a South African racing cyclist, who currently rides for UCI Women's Continental Team Team Coop–Hitec Products.

She lives in Girona, Spain.

Before 2020 Jonker rode on an Australian license. In 2018 she won a bronze medal at the Australian National Time Trial Championships in the Women's Under 23 category. Jonker has also competed for Australia in triathlon.

She rode in the women's time trial event at the 2020 UCI Road World Championships for South Africa.

At the 2022 African Road Championships she won a bronze medal in the individual time trial, and placed 8th in the road race.

In 2021 she started her professional career at Macogep Tornatech Girondins de Bordeaux.

== Major results ==
2018
3rd Time trial, Australian National Under-23 Road Championships
2022
African Road Championships

3rd Time trial
8th Road race

2023
5th Time trial, South African National Road Championships
2024
1st Peaks Challenge Falls Creek
