= Gert van den Berg =

Gert van den Berg, Gert van den Bergh or Gerrit van den Berg may refer to:

- Gert van den Berg (cyclist) (1903–?), Dutch cyclist
- Gert van den Berg (politician) (1935–2024), Dutch politician
- Gert van den Bergh (1920–1968), South African film actor
- Col. Gerritt G. Van Den Bergh, Commander of the 5th Albany Militia Regiment
