= 2017 UCI Road World Championships – Women's time trial =

Cycling race

Women's team time trial
2017 UCI Road World Championships

Race details
- Dates: 19 September 2017
- Stages: 1
- Distance: 21.1 km (13.1 mi)
- Winning time: 28' 50"

Medalists
	Gold	(Netherlands) Annemiek van Vleuten (NED)
	Silver	(Netherlands) Anna van der Breggen (NED)
	Bronze	(Australia) Katrin Garfoot (AUS)

The Women's time trial of the 2017 UCI Road World Championships was a cycling event that took place on 19 September 2017 in Bergen, Norway. Annemiek van Vleuten of the Netherlands won the event.

== Qualification ==
All National Federations were allowed to enter four riders for the race, with a maximum of two riders to start. In addition to this number, the outgoing World Champion and the current continental champions were also able to take part.

Champion	Name	Note
Outgoing World Champion	Amber Neben (USA)	Competed
African Champion	Aurelie Halbwachs (MRI)	Competed
European Champion	Ellen van Dijk (NED)	Competed
Pan American Champion	Chloé Dygert (USA)	Competed
Oceanian Champion	Lucy Kennedy (AUS)	Did not compete
Asian Champion	Liang Hongyu (CHN)	Did not compete

=== Participating nations ===
54 cyclists from 34 nations took part in the women's time trial. The number of cyclists per nation is shown in parentheses.

- Australia (1)
- Austria (1)
- Azerbaijan (1)
- Belgium (1)
- Canada (1)
- Chile (1)
- Colombia (1)
- Cyprus (1)
- Denmark (2)
- Ethiopia (2)
- Finland (2)
- France (2)
- Germany (2)
- Great Britain (2)
- Greece (2)
- Hong Kong (2)
- Ireland (1)
- Israel (2)
- Italy (2)
- Japan (2)
- Lithuania (2)
- Mauritius (1)
- Mexico (1)
- Netherlands (3)
- New Zealand (1)
- Norway (2)
- Poland (1)
- Russia (2)
- Singapore (1)
- South Africa (1)
- Spain (1)
- Switzerland (2)
- Ukraine (1)
- United States (4)

== Final classification ==
All 54 competitors completed the 21.1-kilometre (13.1 mi)-long course.

Rank	Rider	Country	Time
1	Annemiek van Vleuten	Netherlands	28' 50"
2	Anna van der Breggen	Netherlands	+ 12"
3	Katrin Garfoot	Australia	+ 18"
4	Chloé Dygert	United States	+ 37"
5	Ellen van Dijk	Netherlands	+ 52"
6	Linda Villumsen	New Zealand	+ 55"
7	Ashleigh Moolman	South Africa	+ 1' 18"
8	Lauren Stephens	United States	+ 1' 19"
9	Hannah Barnes	United Kingdom	+ 1' 23"
10	Cecilie Uttrup Ludwig	Denmark	+ 1' 34"
11	Amber Neben	United States	+ 1' 41"
12	Lisa Brennauer	Germany	+ 1' 48"
13	Audrey Cordon	France	+ 1' 50"
14	Pernille Mathiesen	Denmark	+ 2' 01"
15	Juliette Labous	France	+ 2' 01"
16	Ann-Sophie Duyck	Belgium	+ 2' 02"
17	Trixi Worrack	Germany	+ 2' 03"
18	Elisa Longo Borghini	Italy	+ 2' 07"
19	Elinor Barker	United Kingdom	+ 2' 10"
20	Lotta Lepistö	Finland	+ 2' 13"
21	Karol-Ann Canuel	Canada	+ 2' 18"
22	Eri Yonamine	Japan	+ 2' 29"
23	Olga Zabelinskaya	Russia	+ 2' 31"
24	Lisa Morzenti	Italy	+ 2' 31"
25	Tayler Wiles	United States	+ 2' 46"
26	Ramona Forchini	Switzerland	+ 2' 47"
27	Ana Sanabria	Colombia	+ 2' 50"
28	Antri Christoforou	Cyprus	+ 2' 51"
29	Marlen Reusser	Switzerland	+ 2' 58"
30	Martina Ritter	Austria	+ 3' 02"
31	Vita Heine	Norway	+ 3' 04"
32	Olena Pavlukhina	Azerbaijan	+ 3' 08"
33	Olga Shekel	Ukraine	+ 3' 28"
34	Rotem Gafinovitz	Israel	+ 3' 30"
35	Sari Saarelainen	Finland	+ 3' 44"
36	Aurela Nerlo	Poland	+ 3' 50"
37	Ksenia Tsymbaliuk	Russia	+ 3' 54"
38	Omer Shapira	Israel	+ 3' 57"
39	Thea Thorsen	Norway	+ 4' 01"
40	Eileen Burns	Ireland	+ 4' 11"
41	Daiva Tušlaitė	Lithuania	+ 4' 19"
42	Lourdes Oyarbide	Spain	+ 4' 21"
43	Varvara Fasoi	Greece	+ 4' 28"
44	Yumi Kajihara	Japan	+ 4' 52"
45	Aurelie Halbwachs	Mauritius	+ 5' 01"
46	Brenda Santoyo	Mexico	+ 5' 10"
47	Eyeru Tesfoam Gebru	Ethiopia	+ 5' 10"
48	Pang Yao	Hong Kong	+ 5' 17"
49	Eleni Tsavari	Greece	+ 5' 18"
50	Aranza Villalón	Chile	+ 5' 31"
51	Yang Qianyu	Hong Kong	+ 5' 40"
52	Selam Amha Gerefiel	Ethiopia	+ 6' 32"
53	Justina Jovaišytė	Lithuania	+ 6' 43"
54	Serene Lee	Singapore	+ 7' 25"
