= Jan Smyrak =

Personal information
- Born: 26 November 1950 (age 75) Tłumaczów, Poland
- Height: 1.76 m (5 ft 9 in)
- Weight: 77 kg (170 lb)

Sport
- Sport: Cycling
- Club: Górnika Słupiec
Medal record
Representing Poland
World championships
Bronze medal – third place	1971 Mendrisio	Team time trial

Jan Smyrak (born 26 November 1950) is a retired Polish and later German cyclist. He won a bronze medal in the 100 km team time trial at the 1971 UCI Road World Championships. He competed at the 1972 Summer Olympics in the individual road race, but failed to finish. He was second in the Tour de Pologne in 1971 and won the Rund um Köln in 1975. He became German citizen some time after the 1972 Olympics.
