= Desiet Kidane =

Eritrean cyclist (2000–2021)

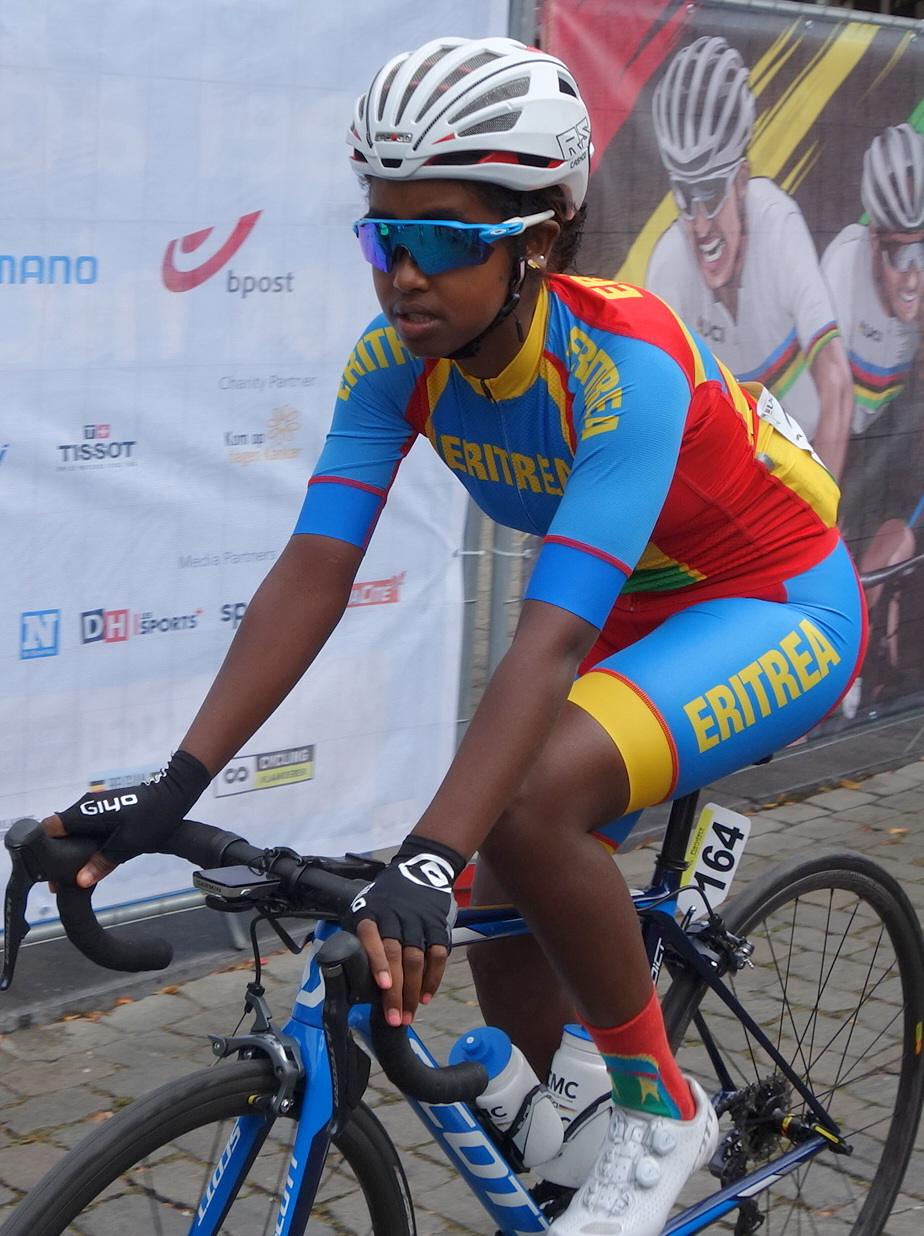
- Kidane at the 2021 World Championships

Personal information
- Born: 10 October 2000
- Died: 8 November 2021 (aged 21) Asmara, Eritrea

Cycling career
- Sport: Cycling
- Discipline: Road
- Role: Rider

Amateur team
- 2018: UCI WCC Women's Team

Professional teams
- 2019: WCC Team
- 2021: WCC Team

Desiet Kidane Teketse (10 October 2000 – 8 November 2021) was an Eritrean professional racing cyclist, who rode for UCI Women's Continental Team WCC Team.

As a junior, she competed at the 2018 Summer Youth Olympics and was crowned the African junior champion in both the road race and time trial. The following year, she won the Eritrean National Time Trial Championships and rode in the women's road race at the UCI Road World Championships in Yorkshire, England. She also won the bronze medal in the time trial at the African Road Championships that season.

She died in 2021 after being hit by a motorist while training in Asmara, Eritrea.
