= 2004 UCI Road World Championships – Women's junior road race =

Junior women's road race
2004 UCI Road World Championships
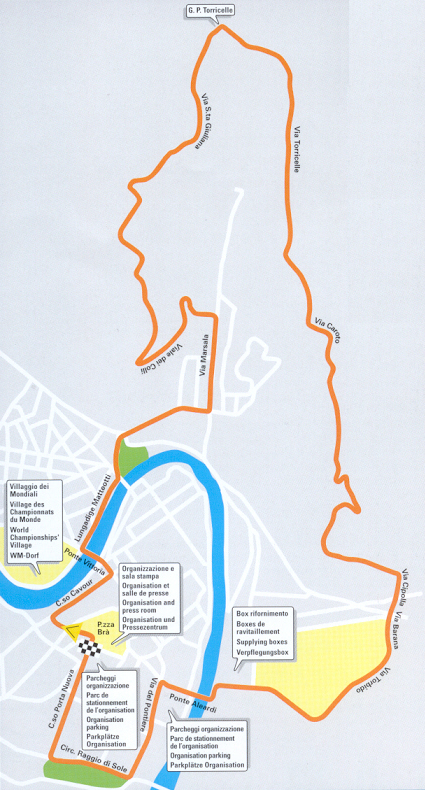

Race details
- Dates: 2004-10-01 in (Italy) Verona (ITA)
- Stages: 1
- Distance: 73.75 km (45.83 mi)
- Winning time: 02h 11' 44"

Medalists
	Gold	Marianne Vos (Netherlands)
	Silver	Marta Bastianelli (Italy)
	Bronze	Ellen van Dijk (Netherlands)

The women's road race of the 2004 UCI Road World Championships cycling event took place on 1 October in Verona, Italy. The race was 73.75 km long, which constituted of 5 laps of a circuit around Torricelle, including the 3.4 km Torricelle climb, with an average gradient of approximately 4% and 7% at the steepest point. 66 junior women's participated in the race. The course was almost identical to the one used for the 1999 UCI Road World Championships.

The race was won by the Dutch rider Marianne Vos. After a rather controlled race until the final climb, Vos attacked at the right spot and soloed the remaining 10 km to the finish. The silver medal went to Marta Bastianelli (Italy), winning the chase group sprint half a minute behind. Third on the podium was another Dutch rider, Ellen van Dijk.

== Course ==
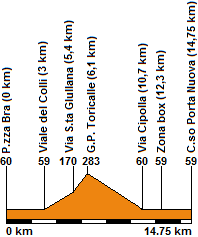
Race profile of the 14.75 km long circuit

The race consisted of 5 laps of 14.75 kilometres on a circuit around Torricelle and was similar to course at the 2009 UCI Road World Championships. The start/finish was at the Piazza Brà. The race started in a northerly direction for three kilometres of flat surface before the start of the 3.1 kilometre-long Torricelle climb that begins from the Viale dei Colli. The climb has an average gradient of about 4%. The final part of the Torricelle is the hardest with a gradient of 7%, where the Viale dei Colli turns to the Via Santa Giuliana 700 metres from the top marking the highest point of the race at 6.1 km. Then the riders swoop down the twisty street for just over 4.5 km before two 90-degree right-handers in close succession, the first coming at 10.7 km at the intersection of Vie Caroto and Cipolla. The feed station is at 12.3 km, before riders cross the Ponte Aleardi bridge and execute a large 'U' that brings them back along the finishing straight of the Corso Porta Nuova.

== Race ==
The race started at 9:30 on a rather cloudy morning. Marianne Vos signaled her presence right after the start, as she attacked during the first kilometer but was caught soon after. The pace was high from the beginning, and the first climb saw some riders struggling already. In front of the peloton, the Polish and Lithuanian riders were setting the pace, as well as Rebecca Much from the United States who was present in front during the whole race. The first lap was completed after a bit more than 26 minutes, with the peloton still together. Climbing the Torricelle for the second time, the race got a little more nervous with some attacks, but the leading riders from Italy, Germany and East-European countries controlled the pace. Another rider in front was Amanda Spratt from Australia, who closed the gap to a Polish rider's attack. The field slowly diminished in number, as some struggled to keep up and the first riders abandoned. After passing the finish line for the second time, at the foot of the Torricelle climb, Spratt crashed inside the bunch, but got up quickly again, made it back to the front and even attacked soon after that. The Italian riders were paying attention and pulled her back. Instead, Francesca Andina and Savrina Bernardi escaped, but were caught by the leading bunch under control of the Ukrainian riders. Spratt was relentless in her efforts, but could not create a gap on her own. With two laps to go the Italian Savrina Bernardi set the pace in the climb and the only riders able to follow were Spratt and Ekaterina Tretiakova from Russia, until a chase group of about 15 joined them on the descent. For the final lap, another group of 15 joined them making a field of about 30 riders, half of the peloton, that rode the decisive phase of the race. The Italian and Dutch teams attacked each other on the last climb, but no break attempt was as powerful as the one by Vos. She took off and nobody could follow. Increasing her lead rapidly, it was about 20 seconds on top of the Torricelle climb, and the chase group down the descent had three other Dutch riders in it, not helping it much. Rebecca Much from the United States was leading the group on her own, and during the last kilometres it became apparent that Vos would take her solo to the finish. The other Dutch riders therefore did not hold back any more and managed to place a second rider on the podium, Ellen van Dijk, who crossed the line right after Marta Bastianelli from Italy.

== Final classification ==
Rank	Rider	Time
1st place, gold medalist(s)	Marianne Vos (NED)	02h 11' 44"
2nd place, silver medalist(s)	Marta Bastianelli (ITA)	at 30"
3rd place, bronze medalist(s)	Ellen van Dijk (NED)	s.t.
4	Alyona Andruk (UKR)	s.t.
5	Roxane Knetemann (NED)	s.t.
6	Daiva Tušlaitė (LTU)	s.t.
7	Ina Tretiakova (RUS)	s.t.
8	Sabrina Bernardi (ITA)	s.t.
9	Savrina Bernardi (AUS)	s.t.
10	Suzanne Van Veen (NED)	s.t.
11	Olena Sharha (UKR)	s.t.
12	Tereza Huříková (CZE)	s.t.
13	Caroline Ibele (GER)	s.t.
14	Olha Polkhovska (UKR)	at 33"
15	Rebecca Much (USA)	s.t.
16	Virginia Hennig (GER)	at 37"
17	Emmanuelle Merlot (FRA)	at 1'19"
18	Jwona Pytel (POL)	at 1'41"
19	Sabine Fischer (GER)	at 1'58"
20	Florence Girardet (FRA)	s.t.
21	Mayuko Hagiwara (JPN)	s.t.
22	Aleksandra Dawidowicz (POL)	s.t.
23	Maria Kazachenko (RUS)	s.t.
24	Kim Schoonbaert (BEL)	s.t.
25	Agne Maracinskaite (LTU)	s.t.
26	Barbara Gromaszek (POL)	s.t.
27	Inga Čilvinaitė (LTU)	s.t.
28	Karin Metzler (SUI)	s.t.
29	Francesca Andina (ITA)	at 2'02"
30	Veronika Sprügel (AUS)	at 3'15"
31	Jennifer Hohl (SUI)	s.t.
32	Federica Balestri (ITA)	at 3'18"
33	Danielys García (VEN)	at 7'13"
34	Hannah Banks (AUS)	at 7'29"
35	Jarmila Machačová (CZE)	at 7'30"
36	Catrine Josefsson (SWE)	s.t.
37	Marie Lindberg (SWE)	at 9'25"
38	Andrea Wölfer (AUS)	s.t.
39	Berenice Castro Plaza (MEX)	s.t.
40	Ine Beyen (BEL)	s.t.
41	Natasha Mapley (AUS)	s.t.
42	Naomi Cooper (CAN)	s.t.
43	Patricia Perez Jimenez (ESP)	s.t.
44	Blendys Rojas (VEN)	s.t.
45	Veranika Vyrastka (BLR)	s.t.
46	Anna Sanchis Chafer (ESP)	at 9'31"
47	Sandrine Allais (FRA)	at 10'24"
48	Andrea Babunkova (CZE)	at 11'18"
49	Anna Tratnyek (CAN)	at 11'32"
50	Joëlle Numainville (CAN)	at 13'52"
51	Marie Le Moing (FRA)	s.t.
52	Irina Tolmacheva (RUS)	s.t.
53	Laura Lepasalu (EST)	at 14'26"
54	Diana Dzemikavichyute (RUS)	s.t.
55	Mylene Laliberte (CAN)	at 14'40"
56	Ramona Weder (SUI)	at 15'28"
57	Axelle Doisy (BEL)	at 18'56"
58	Kata – Liina Normak (EST)	at 19'41"
59	Simona Muraskaite (LIT)	at 19'51"
60	Gabriella Palotai (HUN)	at 20'31"
DID NOT FINISH
	Maria De Lourdes Garcia (ESP)	
Magdalena Pyrgies (POL)
Maria Auxiliadora Martín Morales (ESP)
Franziska Kniesche (GER)
Mary Brennan (IRL)
Stefanie Wiedner (AUS)
