= 2005 UCI Juniors World Championships – Women's road race =

Women's road race
2005 UCI Junior Road World Championships
- Rainbow jersey

Race details
- Dates: 14-08-2005 in (Austria) Salzburg (AUT)
- Stages: 1
- Distance: 70.00 km (43.50 mi)
- Winning time: 01h 56' 10"

Results
	Winner	Mie Lacota (DEN)	(Denmark)
	Second	Marianne Vos (NED)	(the Netherlands)
	Third	Leleivyte Rasa (LTU)	(Lithuania)

The Women's road race at the 2005 UCI Juniors World Championships cycling event took place on 14 August in Salzburg, Austria. The race was 70.00 km long. 82 cyclists participated in the race and 75 finished.

== Final classification (top 10) ==
Rank	Rider	Time
1st place, gold medalist(s)	Mie Lacota (DEN)	01h 56'10"
2nd place, silver medalist(s)	Marianne Vos (NED)	s.t.
3rd place, bronze medalist(s)	Rasa Leleivytė (LTU)	+ 3"
4	Kimberly Geist (USA)	+ 3"
5	Nathalie Lamborelle (LUX)	+ 3"
6	Susi Tosch (GER)	+ 3"
7	Ellen van Dijk (NED)	+ 3"
8	Tereza Huříková (CZE)	+ 3"
9	Pascale Jeuland (FRA)	+ 3"
10	Julie Krasniak (FRA)	+ 3"

Results from cyclingarchives.com
