= Barbara Meyer =

Barbara Meyer may refer to:

- Barbara J. Meyer (born 1949), biologist
- Barbara Meyer (curler), Swiss curler, 1983 World champion
