= Annemiek van Vleuten =

Dutch cyclist (born 1982)

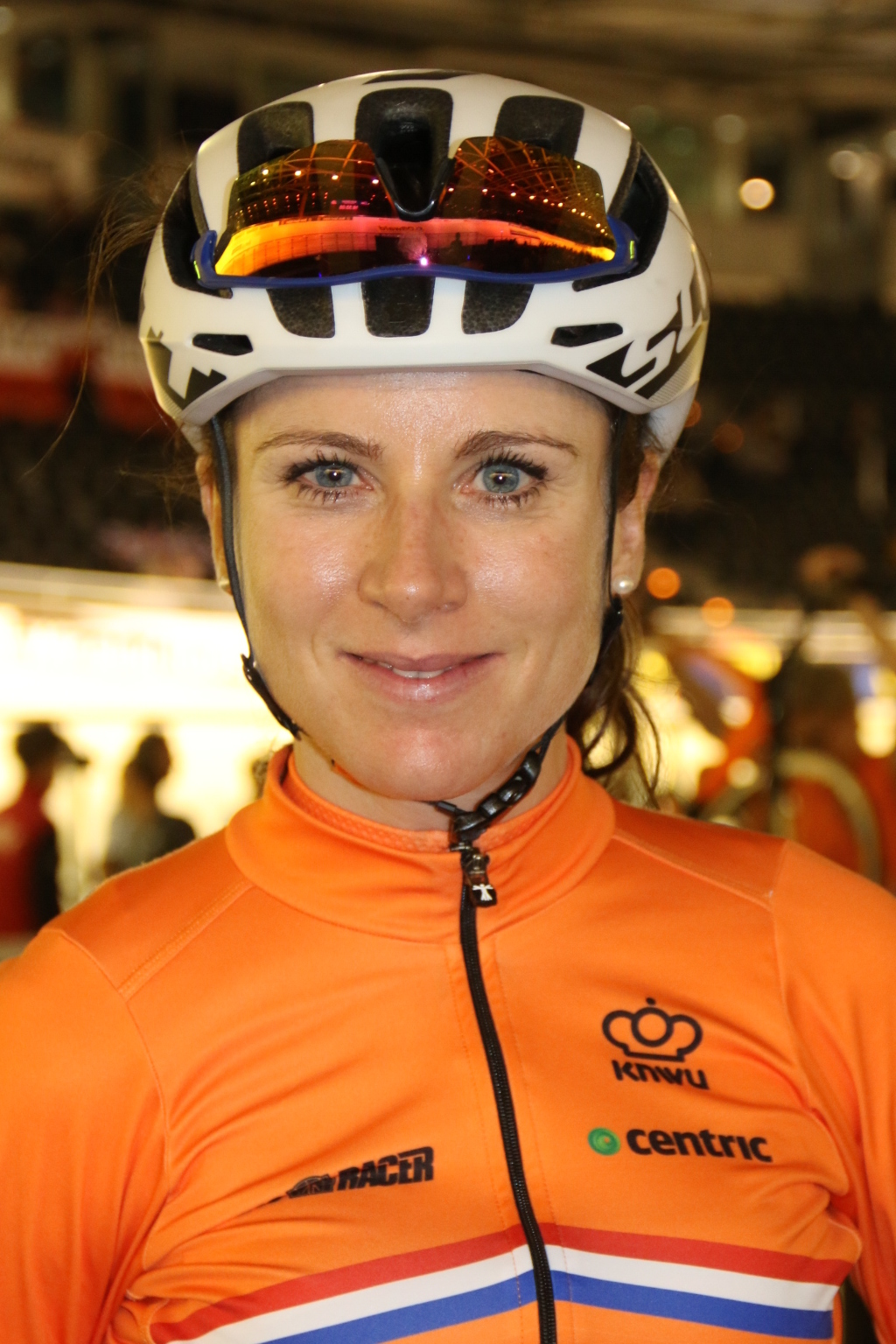
- Van Vleuten at the 2017 UEC European Track Championships

Personal information
- Nicknames: Vleuty; Peluchen; Miek; AVV
- Born: 8 October 1982 (age 44) Vleuten, Netherlands
- Height: 1.68 m (5 ft 6 in)
- Weight: 59 kg (130 lb)

Cycling career
- Sport: Cycling
- Discipline: Road
- Role: Rider
- Rider type: All-rounder

Amateur teams
- 2007: Therme Skin Care
- 2008: Vrienden van het Platteland

Professional teams
- 2009–2014: Rabobank-Liv Woman Cycling Team
- 2015: Bigla Pro Cycling Team
- 2016–2020: Mitchelton–Scott
- 2021–2023: Movistar Team

Major wins
- Major Tours Tour de France General classification (2022) 2 individual stages (2022) Giro Donne General classification (2018, 2019, 2022, 2023) Points classification (2017, 2018, 2019, 2022, 2023) Mountains classification (2017, 2019, 2023) 16 individual stages (2014, 2015, 2017–2020, 2022, 2023) La Vuelta Femenina General classification (2023) Stage races La Route de France (2010) Belgium Tour (2014, 2016) Holland Ladies Tour (2017, 2018) Ladies Tour of Norway (2021) Challenge by La Vuelta (2021, 2022) One-day races and Classics Olympic Games Time Trial (2020) World Road Race Championships (2019, 2022) World Time Trial Championships (2017, 2018) European Road Championships (2020) National Road Race Championships (2012) National Time Trial Championships (2014, 2016, 2017, 2019) Tour of Flanders (2011, 2021) Liège–Bastogne–Liège (2019, 2022) La Course by Le Tour de France (2017, 2018) Strade Bianche (2019, 2020) Dwars door Vlaanderen (2021) Open de Suède Vårgårda (2011) GP de Plouay (2011) Ronde van Drenthe (2010) GP Stad Roeselare (2012) Cadel Evans Great Ocean Road Race (2017) Other UCI Women's Road World Cup (2011) UCI Women's World Tour (2018, 2021, 2022) Vélo d'Or (2022)
Medal record
Women's road cycling
Representing Netherlands
Olympic Games
Gold medal – first place	2020 Tokyo	Time trial
Silver medal – second place	2020 Tokyo	Road race
World Championships
Gold medal – first place	2017 Bergen	Time trial
Gold medal – first place	2018 Innsbruck	Time trial
Gold medal – first place	2019 Harrogate	Road race
Gold medal – first place	2022 Wollongong	Road race
Silver medal – second place	2013 Florence	Team time trial
Silver medal – second place	2020 Imola	Road race
Silver medal – second place	2021 Flanders	Mixed team relay
Bronze medal – third place	2019 Harrogate	Time trial
Bronze medal – third place	2021 Flanders	Time trial
European Championships
Gold medal – first place	2020 Plouay	Road race
European Games
Bronze medal – third place	2015 Baku	Time trial
World University Cycling Championship
Silver medal – second place	2008 Nijmegen	Time trial
Bronze medal – third place	2008 Nijmegen	Road race
Women's track cycling
World Championships
Silver medal – second place	2018 Apeldoorn	Individual pursuit

Annemiek van Vleuten (Dutch: [ˌɑnəˈmik fɑɱ ˈvløːtə(n)]; born 8 October 1982) is a retired Dutch professional road racing cyclist, who most recently rode for UCI Women's WorldTeam Movistar Team.

Van Vleuten is twice a winner of both the road race (2019 and 2022) and the time trial (2017 and 2018) at the UCI Road World Championships. In the Olympic Games, she crashed out of the lead of the road race in 2016, before winning the gold medal at the time trial event and a silver in the road race at the COVID-19 pandemic-delayed 2020 Olympics. She won the Dutch National Road Race Championships in 2012, and won the Dutch National Time Trial Championships four times between 2014 and 2019.

Van Vleuten has won all three of women's cycling Grand Tours equivalents – winning the Giro Donne in 2018, 2019, 2022 and 2023, winning the inaugural Tour de France Femmes in 2022 and winning La Vuelta Femenina in 2023. In 2022, she became the first woman to complete a Giro–Tour double in the same year. Van Vleuten has won nine grand tours and six of women's cycling Grand Tours equivalents in a row.

In winning the UCI Women's Road World Cup in 2011, and the UCI Women's World Tour in 2018, 2021 and 2022, van Vleuten won multiple stage races and one day events. She has won cycling monuments including Liège–Bastogne–Liège Femmes, Strade Bianche Donne and Tour of Flanders for Women on multiple occasions. She has been awarded Dutch women's cyclist of the year three times, and is considered one of the greatest female cyclists ever. Van Vleuten retired at the end of the 2023 season.

== Career ==
As a child, van Vleuten played football, gymnastics and horse riding, and rode her bike to school. Van Vleuten studied animal sciences and specialised in zoonoses and epidemiology at the University of Wageningen, graduating with a master's degree in epidemiology in 2007. In 2005, she was advised by her doctor to take up cycling following a knee injury playing football.

=== Early career ===
Starting her cycling career at amateur teams in 2007 aged 25, van Vleuten joined the Dutch DSB Bank - Nederland bloeit team in 2009. Quitting her office job in 2010 to become a full time professional cyclist, her first major win was at the 2010 Novilon Eurocup Ronde van Drenthe. She then won La Route de France later that year. In 2011, she won the UCI Women's Road World Cup, winning key races like Tour of Flanders for Women, GP de Plouay – Bretagne and Open de Suède Vårgårda.

In 2012, van Vleuten represented the Netherlands in the Women's road race at the 2012 Summer Olympics, along with Ellen van Dijk, Marianne Vos and Loes Gunnewijk. The race was won by Vos. Van Vleuten also won the Dutch National Road Race Championships. After a less than successful 2013, she won the Dutch National Time Trial Championships for the first time in 2014. In 2015 she joined the Bigla Pro Cycling Team. She took part in the 2015 European Games for the Netherlands, in cycling; van Vleuten won a bronze medal in the time trial, and finished seventh in the road race.

=== Orica–AIS (2016–2020) ===
In 2016, van Vleuten joined the Orica–AIS team. On 7 August 2016, while leading the road race at the Olympic Games, van Vleuten crashed head first on the steep descent from Vista Chinesa after missing her braking point before a sharp bend, 12 kilometres (7.5 miles) before the finish. The crash knocked her unconscious, and she was hospitalised with three lumbar spinal fractures and a severe concussion. Despite her injuries, van Vleuten was riding a bicycle within ten days of her accident and made a winning return to competition one month later, taking the overall victory and two stage wins at the Belgium Tour. Earlier in the season, she had also won her second Dutch National Time Trial Championships.

==== 2017–2019: World Championships, Giro Rosa victories ====
In 2017, she became world champion for the first time, winning the time trial event in Bergen, Norway. She also won the Holland Ladies Tour, La Course by Le Tour de France, and retained her national Time Trial Championship.

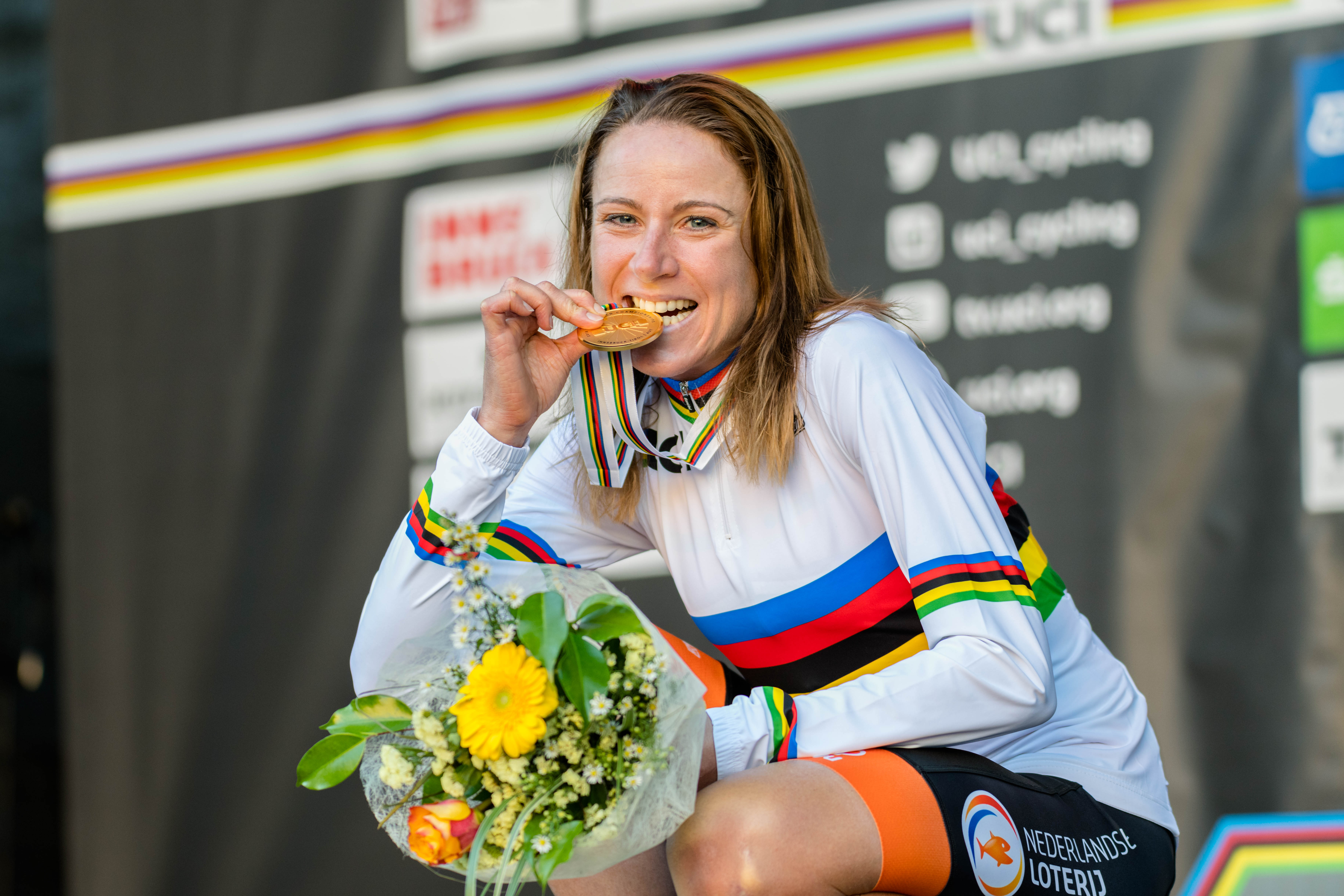
Van Vleuten defended her world title in the time trial at the 2018 UCI Road World Championships

2018 was van Vleuten's most successful year of her career – she won the Giro Rosa (winning 3 stages), she defended her world title in the time trial at the 2018 UCI Road World Championships in Innsbruck, Austria, and she won the UCI Women's World Tour after multiple victories at events such as La Course by Le Tour de France and the Holland Ladies Tour. She ended the 2018 season with a total of 13 victories.

In 2019, van Vleuten defended her Giro Rosa title, winning by over 3 minutes and taking all the major classifications (general, points and mountain). At the UCI Road World Championships in Harrogate, she won the road race after riding solo for 100 kilometres (62 miles) of the 149-kilometre (93-mile) race, holding back the chasing groups. She also won the Dutch national time trial championship for the fourth time. Despite winning the Giro Rosa and major races such as Liège–Bastogne–Liège and Strade Bianche, van Vleuten finished second in the UCI Women's World Tour standings behind fellow Dutch rider Marianne Vos.

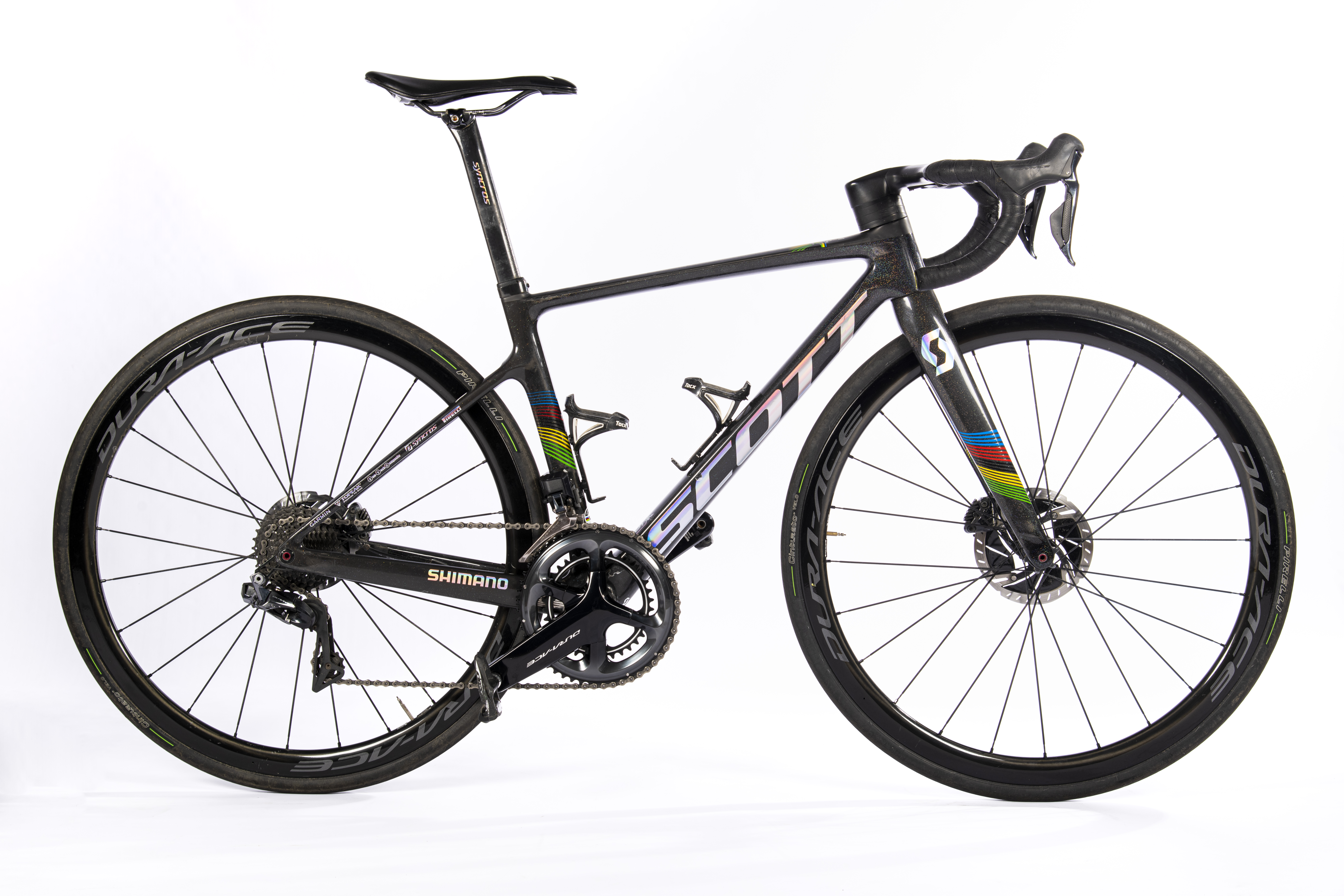
Racing bike used by van Vleuten in 2020

In the COVID-19 pandemic-disrupted 2020 season, she won the road race at the European Road Championships, as well as Strade Bianche for the second time.

=== Movistar Team (2021–2023) ===
==== 2021: Olympic Games medals ====
For the 2021 season, van Vleuten joined the Movistar Team. She started her season by winning Tour of Flanders for Women, 10 years after her first victory.

In July, she was one of four Dutch cyclists competing in the 137-kilometre (85-mile) women's Olympic road race in Tokyo, where she won the silver medal in the race, crossing the finish line 75 seconds behind Austria's Anna Kiesenhofer. With around 60 kilometres (37 miles) left in the race, van Vleuten crashed, but rejoined the race. Her attack with 2.1 kilometres (1.3 miles) to go secured her second place. When van Vleuten finished the race, she celebrated thinking she had won, as she was unaware of Kiesenhofer being in front of her. Three days later, she became Olympic champion by winning the gold medal in the time trial.

She won the UCI Women's World Tour for the second time, following victories at the Challenge by La Vuelta and Ladies Tour of Norway. In October, she crashed in the first ever Paris–Roubaix Femmes, breaking her pubis bone in two places, ending her season. In December, van Vleuten was named Dutch cyclist of the year (Keetie van Oosten-Hage Trophy) for a third time, having previously won the award in 2017 and 2019.

==== 2022: Giro–Tour–Vuelta triple, second world road race title ====
In 2022, van Vleuten started her season by winning two classics – Omloop Het Nieuwsblad, and the Liège–Bastogne–Liège Femmes for the second time. In June, van Vleuten signed a one-year contract extension with the Movistar Team, with the intention to retire from cycling at the end of the 2023 season. She won her third Giro Donne the following month, winning two stages and the points classification.

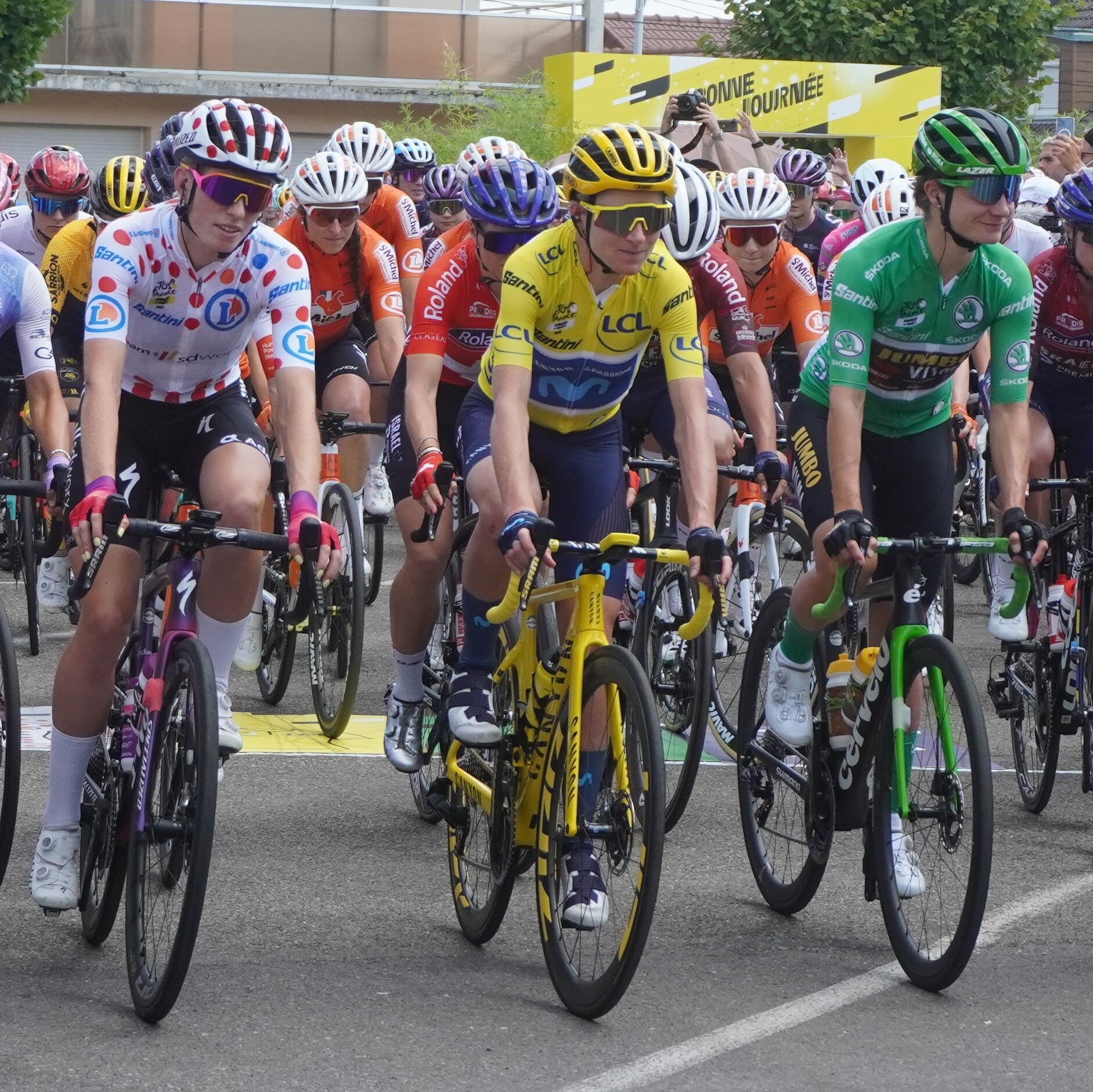
Van Vleuten in the yellow jersey at Stage 8 of the 2022 Tour de France Femmes

Later the same month, she was named as one of the pre-race favourites for the inaugural edition of the Tour de France Femmes. During the race, she suffered from stomach issues early on, which had left her more than a minute behind race leader Marianne Vos after three stages. Having moved up to eighth overall following the sixth stage, van Vleuten split the race apart on the penultimate stage (Stage 7); having attacked on the first climb of the day, the Col du Petit Ballon, only Demi Vollering was able to keep pace with van Vleuten. Before the top of the next climb, the Col du Platzerwasel, van Vleuten was on her own, having accelerated clear of Vollering. Van Vleuten remained clear for the remaining 62 kilometres (39 miles) and ultimately won the stage by over three minutes, moving into the race lead. The next day she cemented her victory, extending her lead in the process; she attacked with 6 kilometres (3.7 miles) remaining, passed the remaining breakaway riders, and soloed to win by 30 seconds ahead of Vollering. In the general classification, van Vleuten won by nearly four minutes from Vollering, with only five other riders within ten minutes. She became the first woman to complete a Giro–Tour double in the same year.

In September, she won the Challenge by La Vuelta, as well as winning the second stage. The following week, van Vleuten recorded her worst result in the time trial at the UCI Road World Championships in Wollongong, finishing in seventh place – a result she described as a "shit day". Three days later, in the mixed team relay, van Vleuten crashed shortly after leaving the start, which resulted in a fractured elbow and made her a doubt for the road race three days later. Van Vleuten ultimately took the start of the race, initially riding as a domestique for Marianne Vos. By the end, van Vleuten capitalised on a late-race stalling of pace, attacking with around 700 metres (2,300 feet) remaining, holding off around a dozen riders by a second to take the rainbow jersey. In doing so, van Vleuten became the first female rider to win the Triple Crown of Cycling.

==== 2023: La Vuelta Femenina and 4th Giro Donne ====
Van Vleuten did not win any major classics in the first few months of the season, with rival Demi Vollering achieving a clean sweep of the Ardennes Classics. However, she won the inaugural edition of La Vuelta Femenina, beating Vollering by nine seconds. This made van Vleuten the first woman to win all three of women's cycling major races. Van Vleuten then won her fourth Giro Donne by a margin of nearly 4 minutes, winning three stages, the points classification and the mountains classification. The second edition of Tour de France Femmes was won by Vollering, with van Vleuten finishing 4th overall. She stated disappointment with the result, explaining that illness had dampened her performance. Van Vleuten retired at the end of the 2023 season.

=== Post-retirement ===
In December 2024, Van Vleuten announced she would join the Fenix–Premier Tech team in a young rider development role. She has also worked as a pundit for Dutch television.

== Personal life ==
Outside of cycling, van Vleuten lives a low-key life, enjoying scuba diving, watching football, and playing the Settlers of Catan board game with friends. Van Vleuten has been in a relationship with Spanish former amateur cyclist Oscar Abad since 2022, and she gave birth to her first child, a son, in September 2025.

== See also ==
- List of Dutch Olympic cyclists
