= 1971 UCI Road World Championships =

- Venue: Mendrisio, Switzerland
- Date: 4-5 September 1971

The 1971 UCI Road World Championships took place from 4-5 September 1971 in Mendrisio, Switzerland.

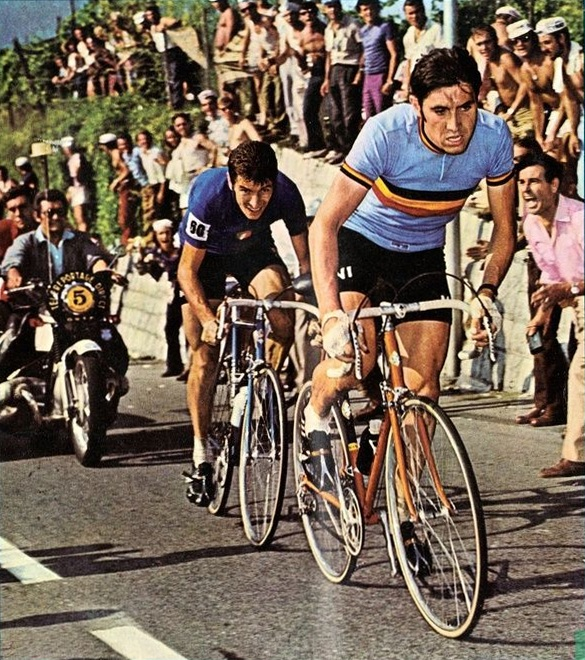
Eddy Merckx followed by Felice Gimondi during the men's road race final

== Results ==
Race:	Gold:	Time	Silver:	Time	Bronze :	Time
Men
Men's road race	Eddy Merckx; Belgium	6 h 39 min 06s	Felice Gimondi; Italy	m.t.	Cyrille Guimard; France	+ 1 min 13s
Amateurs' road race	Régis Ovion; France	-	Freddy Maertens; Belgium	-	José Viejo; Spain	-
Team time trial	Belgium; Gustaaf Hermans; Gustaaf Van Cauter; Louis Verreydt; Ludo Van Der Linden	-	Netherlands; Fedor den Hertog; Adri Duyker; Frits Schur; Aad van den Hoek	-	Poland; Edward Barcik; Stanisław Szozda; Jan Smyrak; Lucjan Lis	-
Women
Women's road race	Anna Konkina; Soviet Union	-	Morena Tartagni; Italy	-	Keetie van Oosten-Hage; Netherlands	-

== Medal table ==
Rank	Nation	Gold	Silver	Bronze	Total
1	Belgium	2	1	0	3
2	France	1	0	1	2
3	Soviet Union	1	0	0	1
4	Italy	0	2	0	2
5	Netherlands	0	1	1	2
6	Poland	0	0	1	1
6	Spain	0	0	1	1
Totals (7 entries)		4	4	4	12
