= Gert van den Berg (cyclist) =

Dutch cyclist

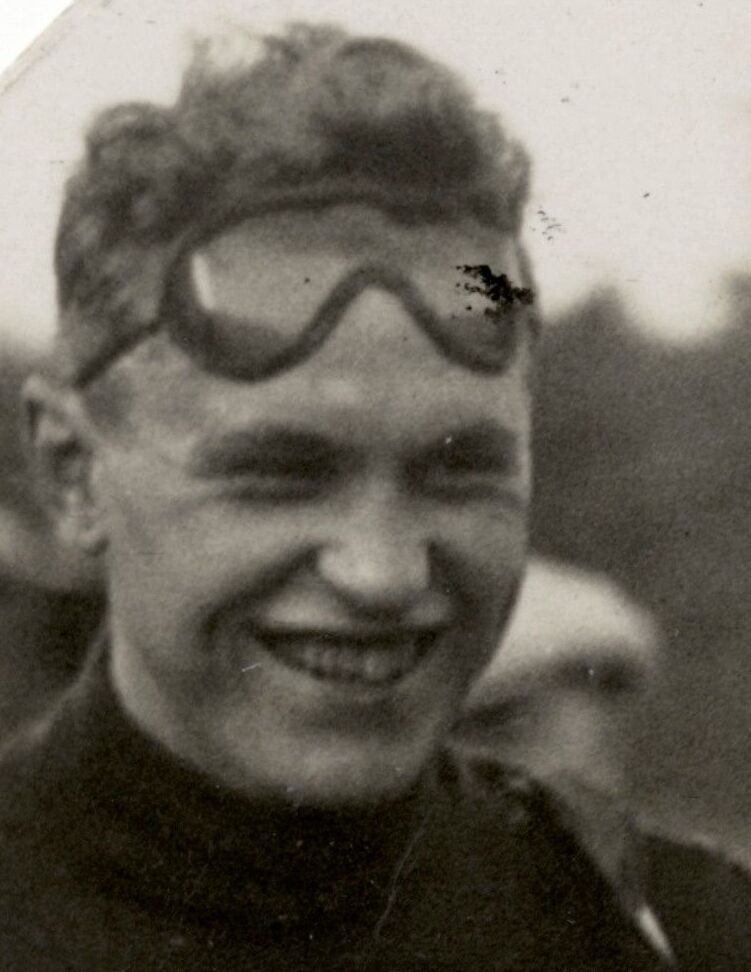
- Gert van den Berg in 1925

Personal information
- Born: 24 May 1903 Amsterdam, Netherlands

Sport
- Sport: Cycling
Medal record
Representing the Netherlands
Road World Championships
Bronze medal – third place	1925 Apeldoorn	Road race

Gerrit "Gert" van den Berg (24 May 1903 – ?) was a Dutch cyclist who won a bronze medal in the road race at the 1925 World Championships.
