= Agusta Edda Bjornsdóttir =

Icelandic cyclist (born 1977)

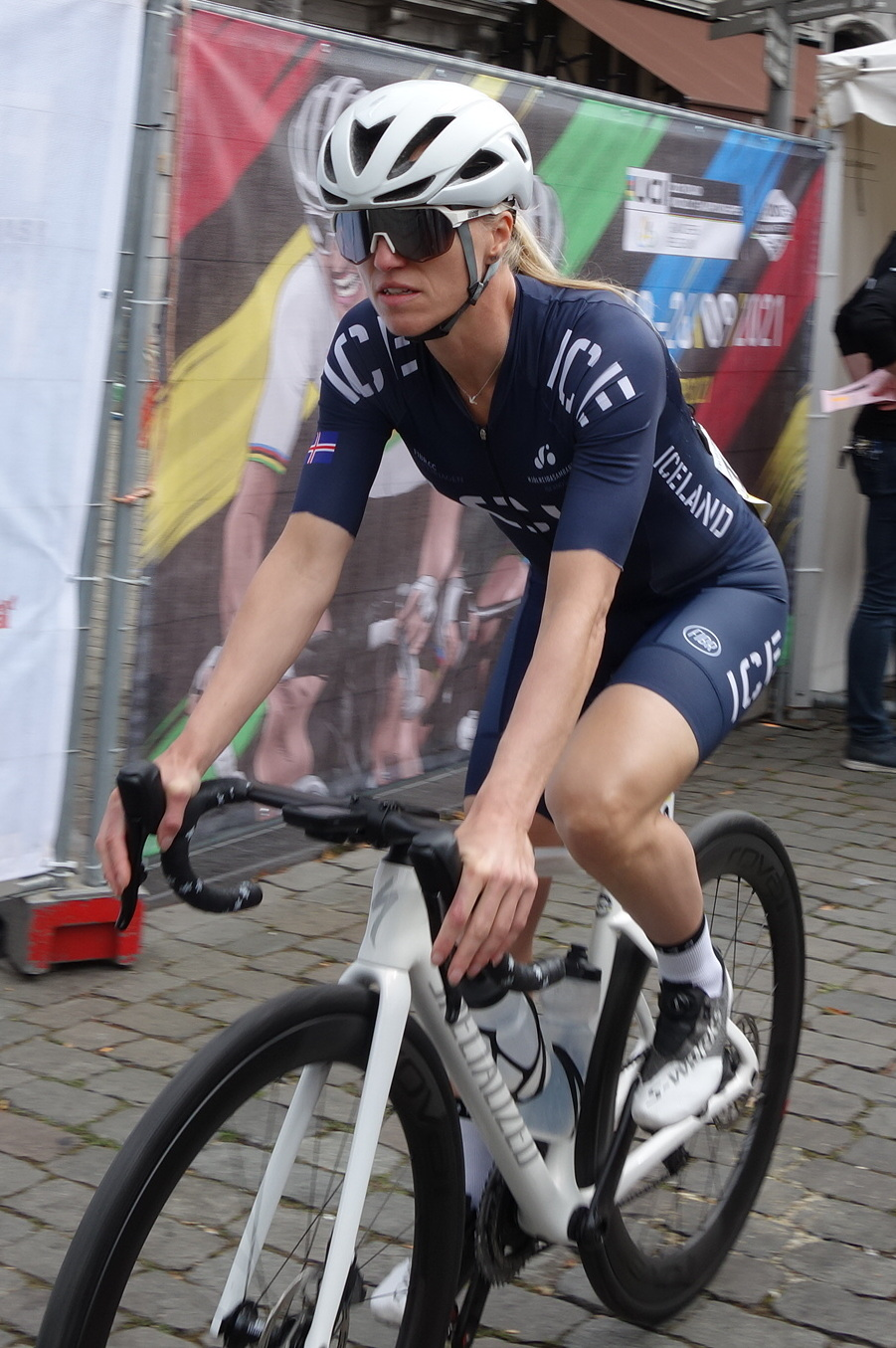
- Bjornsdóttir at the 2021 World Championships

Personal information
- Born: 15 March 1977 (age 49)

Cycling career
- Sport: Cycling
- Role: Rider

Agusta Edda Bjornsdóttir (born 15 March 1977) is an Icelandic road racing cyclist. She became national time trial champion in 2017, 2019 and 2020; and national road race champion in 2019 and 2020. She represented Iceland in the women's time trial and women's road race at the 2019 UCI Road World Championships and 2020 UCI Road World Championships. At the 2020 championships she was 43 years old.

== Major results ==
2016
1st (Iceland) Cyclo-cross, National Cyclo-cross Championships

2017
National Road Championships

1st (Iceland) Time Trial
3rd Road Race

2nd Glacier 360 Mountainbike

2018
National Road Championships

1st (Iceland) Road Race
2nd Time Trial

1st (Iceland) Cyclo-cross, National Cyclo-cross Championships

2019
National Road Championships

1st (Iceland) Road Race
1st (Iceland) Time Trial

2020
National Road Championships

1st (Iceland) Road Race
1st (Iceland) Time Trial
