= Adri Duycker =

Dutch cyclist

Personal information
- Born: 13 October 1946 (age 79) Beverwijk, the Netherlands

Sport
- Sport: Cycling
Medal record
Representing the Netherlands
UCI Road World Championships
Bronze medal – third place	1970 Leicester	Team time trial
Silver medal – second place	1971 Mendrisio	Team time trial

Adri Duycker (born 13 October 1946) is a retired Dutch cyclist. He was part of the Dutch teams, that won a silver and bronze medals in the 1970 and 1971 UCI Road World Championships in the team time trial.
