= Frits Schür =

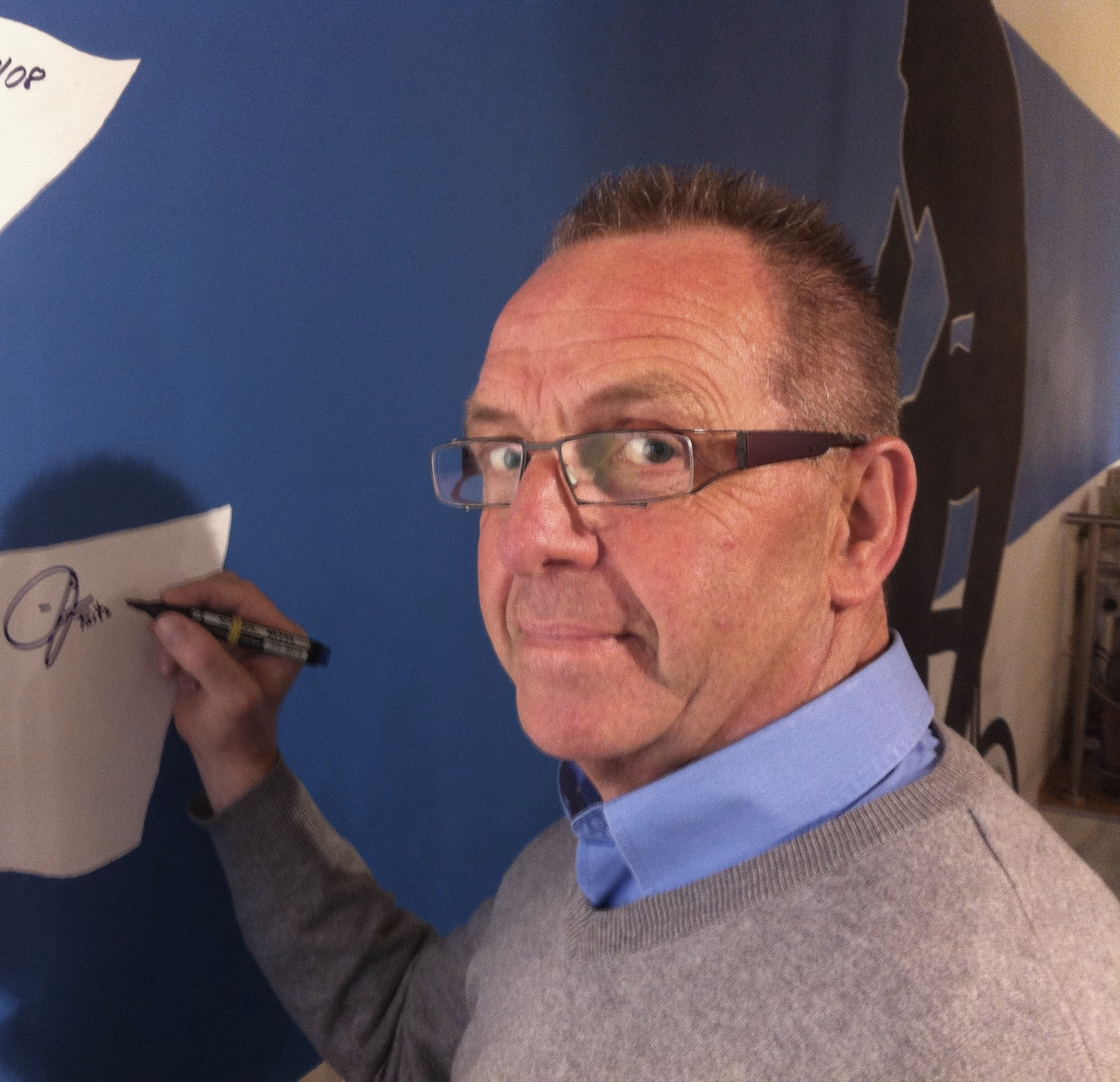
- Frits Schür in 2012

Personal information
- Born: 22 June 1950 (age 76) Zuidlaarderveen, the Netherlands
- Height: 1.77 m (5 ft 10 in)
- Weight: 74 kg (163 lb)

Sport
- Sport: Cycling
Medal record
Representing the Netherlands
UCI Road World Championships
Silver medal – second place	1971 Mendrisio	Team time trial

Frederikus Johannes Maria Goduwes "Frits" Schür (born 22 July 1950) is a retired Dutch cyclist who was active between 1970 and 1984. He competed at the 1976 Summer Olympics in the individual road race, but failed to finish. He won the Olympia's Tour in 1970 and 1972 and Tour of Algeria in 1972, as well as a silver medal in the team time trial at the 1971 UCI Road World Championships.

== See also ==
- List of Dutch Olympic cyclists
