= 2020 UCI Road World Championships =

Cycling world championships

- Location within Emilia-Romagna Location within Italy
- Venue: Imola, Italy
- Date: 24–27 September 2020
- Coordinates: 44°21′12″N 11°42′51″E
- Events: 4

The 2020 UCI Road World Championships is the 93rd edition of the UCI Road World Championships, the annual world championships for road bicycle racing. It took place between 24 and 27 September 2020 in Imola, Italy. The event was originally planned to be held in the Aigle and Martigny area in Switzerland, but this was cancelled on 12 August in response to the ongoing COVID-19 pandemic.

No under-23 or junior races were contested at the Championships; however, under-23 riders were eligible to compete in the elite races.

== Courses ==
The road races took place on a 28.8 kilometres (17.9 mi) course, starting and finishing at the Autodromo Internazionale Enzo e Dino Ferrari (a motor racing circuit). Heading out from the Autodromo into the Emilia-Romagna countryside, the course used two climbs with an average gradient of 10% separated by the town of Riolo Terme, before returning to the Autodromo. The men's road race would lap the course nine times, and the women's road race would lap the course five times.

The time trial events took place on a 31.7 kilometres (19.7 mi) flat course, starting from the Autodromo before turning at Borgo Tossignano to return to the finish line at the Autodromo. Both the men and the women raced on the same course.

== Schedule ==
All times listed below are for the local time – Central European Summer Time or UTC+02:00.

Date	Timings		Event	Distance	Laps
Individual time trial events
24 September	14:40	16:35	Women	31.7 km (19.7 mi)	1
25 September	14:30	16:35	Men	31.7 km (19.7 mi)	1
Road race events
26 September	12:35	16:45	Women	143 km (89 mi)	5 (Note: The first racing lap of each road race is a kilometre shorter than the full 28.8-kilometre (17.9-mile)-long circuit, as it forms part of the 5.9-kilometre (3.7-mile)-long neutralised section.)
27 September	09:45	16:45	Men	258.2 km (160.4 mi)	9

== Events summary ==
Event	Gold		Silver		Bronze	
Men's Events
Men's road race	Julian Alaphilippe (FRA)	6 h 38' 34"	Wout van Aert (BEL)	+ 24"	Marc Hirschi (SUI)	+ 24"
Men's time trial	Filippo Ganna (ITA)	35' 54.10"	Wout van Aert (BEL)	+ 26.72"	Stefan Küng (SUI)	+ 29.80"
Women's Events
Women's road race	Anna van der Breggen (NED)	4h 09' 57"	Annemiek van Vleuten (NED)	+ 1' 20"	Elisa Longo Borghini (ITA)	+ 1' 20"
Women's time trial	Anna van der Breggen (NED)	40' 20.14"	Marlen Reusser (SUI)	+ 15.58"	Ellen van Dijk (NED)	+ 31.46"

== Medal table ==
* Host nation (Italy)

Rank	Nation	Gold	Silver	Bronze	Total
1	Netherlands (NED)	2	1	1	4
2	Italy (ITA)*	1	0	1	2
3	France (FRA)	1	0	0	1
4	Belgium (BEL)	0	2	0	2
5	Switzerland (SUI)	0	1	2	3
Totals (5 entries)		4	4	4	12

== Sources ==
- "2020 UCI Road World Championships - Technical Guide" (PDF). UCI.org. Union Cycliste Internationale. 21 September 2020.
