= Karol-Ann Canuel =

Canadian cyclist (born 1988)

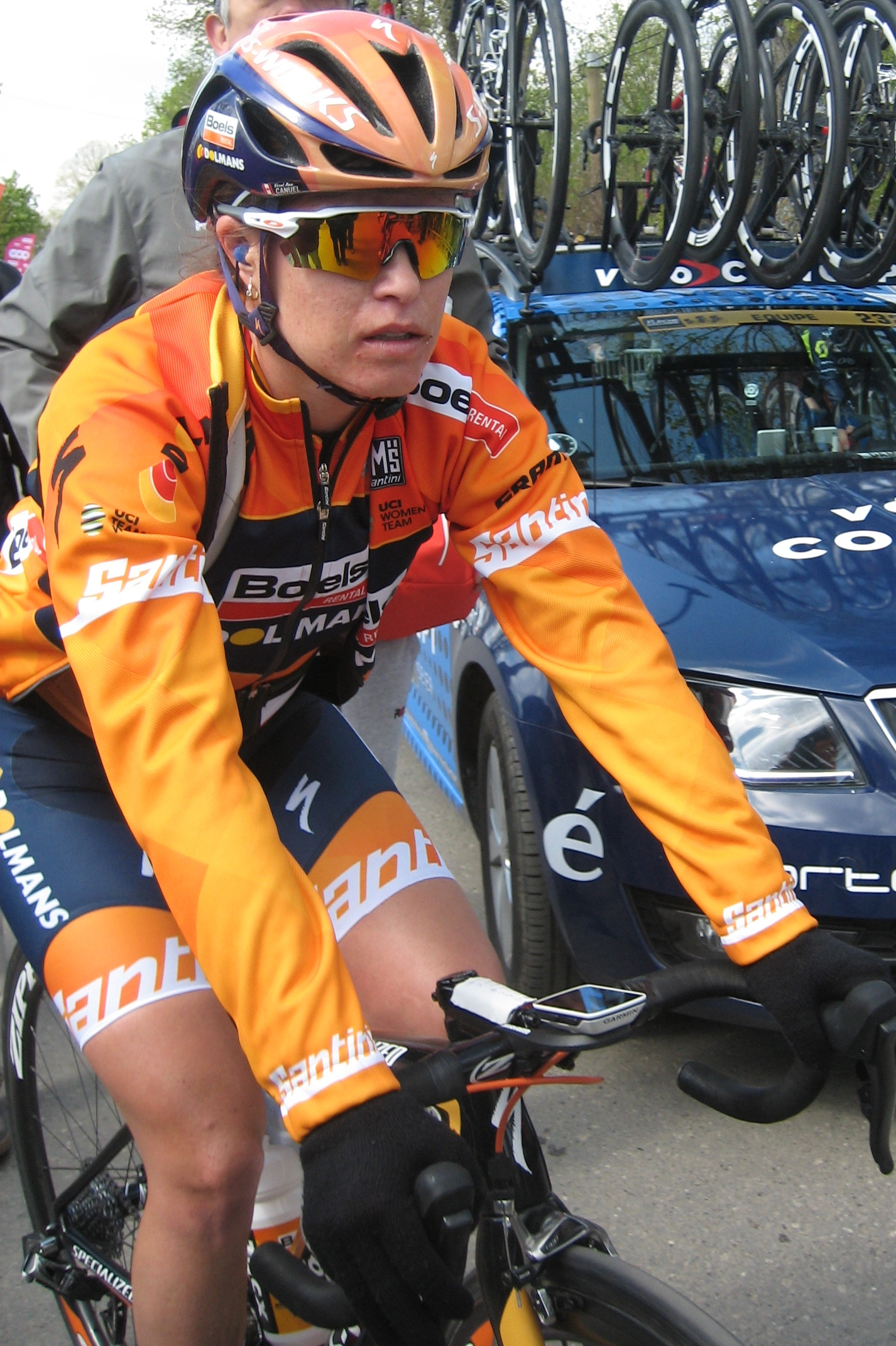
- Canuel at the 2017 La Flèche Wallonne Féminine

Personal information
- Full name: Karol-Ann Canuel
- Born: 18 April 1988 (age 38) Amos, Quebec, Canada
- Height: 163 cm (5 ft 4 in)
- Weight: 51 kg (112 lb)

Cycling career
- Sport: Cycling
- Discipline: Road
- Role: Rider
- Rider type: Time trialist

Professional teams
- 2010–2013: Vienne Futuroscope
- 2014–2015: Specialized–lululemon
- 2016–2021: Boels–Dolmans
Medal record
Women's road bicycle racing
World Championships
Representing Specialized–lululemon
Gold medal – first place	2014 Ponferrada	Team time trial
Gold medal – first place	2015 Richmond	Team time trial
Representing Boels–Dolmans
Gold medal – first place	2016 Doha	Team time trial
Silver medal – second place	2017 Bergen	Team time trial
Silver medal – second place	2018 Innsbruck	Team time trial

Karol-Ann Canuel (born 18 April 1988) is a Canadian former racing cyclist, who rode professionally between 2010 and 2021 for the Vienne Futuroscope, Velocio–SRAM and SD Worx teams.

== Career ==
In October 2015 it was announced that Canuel would join Boels–Dolmans for 2016 after two seasons with Specialized–lululemon, reuniting her with former teammates Evelyn Stevens and Chantal Blaak. In 2016, she was named in Canada's 2016 Olympic team. She was part of the squads that won the women's team time trial world championship for three consecutive years, in 2014, 2015 and 2016.

She represented Canada at the 2020 Summer Olympics. Canuel retired from competition after the 2021 UCI Road World Championships in Flanders, having extended her career by a season to compete in the COVID-19 pandemic-delayed Olympics.

== Major results ==
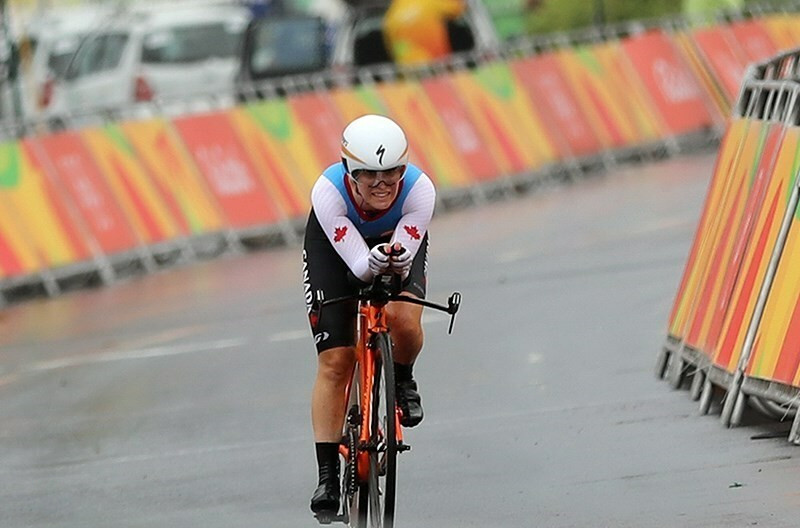
Canuel at the 2016 Summer Olympics Time Trial.

2006
5th Road race, UCI Juniors World Championships
2009
Canada Summer Games

3rd Criterium
3rd Time trial

2011
2nd Overall Tour de Bretagne Féminin
4th Overall Tour Féminin en Limousin
7th Grand Prix Cycliste de Gatineau
2012
5th Overall Tour Cycliste Féminin International de l'Ardèche
9th Overall La Route de France
9th Trofeo Alfredo Binda-Comune di Cittiglio
10th La Flèche Wallonne Féminine
2013
3rd Overall Tour Cycliste Féminin International de l'Ardèche

1st Stage 5

5th GP de Plouay
6th Overall Tour Féminin en Limousin
6th Overall Trophée d'Or Féminin
7th Road race, Jeux de la Francophonie
8th Road race, Pan American Road Championships
2014
1st Team time trial
1st Open de Suède Vårgårda TTT
6th UCI Road World Championships – Women's time trial
10th Ronde van Overijssel
2015
1st Team time trial, UCI Road World Championships
1st Time trial, National Road Championships
1st Stage 4 Gracia–Orlová
2nd Overall Thüringen Rundfahrt der Frauen

1st Stage 7

2nd Chrono Gatineau
2nd Crescent Women World Cup Vårgårda TTT
2016
1st Team time trial, UCI Road World Championships
1st Crescent Vårgårda UCI Women's WorldTour TTT
2nd Time trial, National Road Championships
3rd Chrono Gatineau
4th Overall Holland Ladies Tour

1st Stage 2 (TTT)

2017
1st Time trial, National Road Championships
1st Crescent Vårgårda UCI Women's WorldTour TTT
2nd Team time trial, UCI Road World Championships
2nd Chrono Gatineau
8th Overall Giro d'Italia Femminile

1st Stage 1 (TTT)

2018
1st Crescent Vårgårda TTT
2nd UCI Road World Championships – Women's time trial
2nd Time trial, National Road Championships
2nd Chrono Gatineau
6th UCI Road World Championships – Women's road race
7th Grand Prix Cycliste de Gatineau
8th UCI Road World Championships – Women's time trial
8th Trofeo Alfredo Binda-Comune di Cittiglio
2019
National Road Championships

1st Road race
2nd Time trial

6th Overall Madrid Challenge by la Vuelta
9th Overall Setmana Ciclista Valenciana
2020
9th Strade Bianche Women
2021
5th Overall Belgium Tour

== See also ==
- 2014 Specialized–lululemon season
