= New Zealand at the UCI Road World Championships =

- IOC code: NZL
- Medals: Gold 4 Silver 3 Bronze 3 Total 10

This is an overview of the results of New Zealand at the UCI Road World Championships.

== List of medalists ==
=== New Zealand medals ===
This is a list of New Zealand medals won at the UCI Road World Championships.

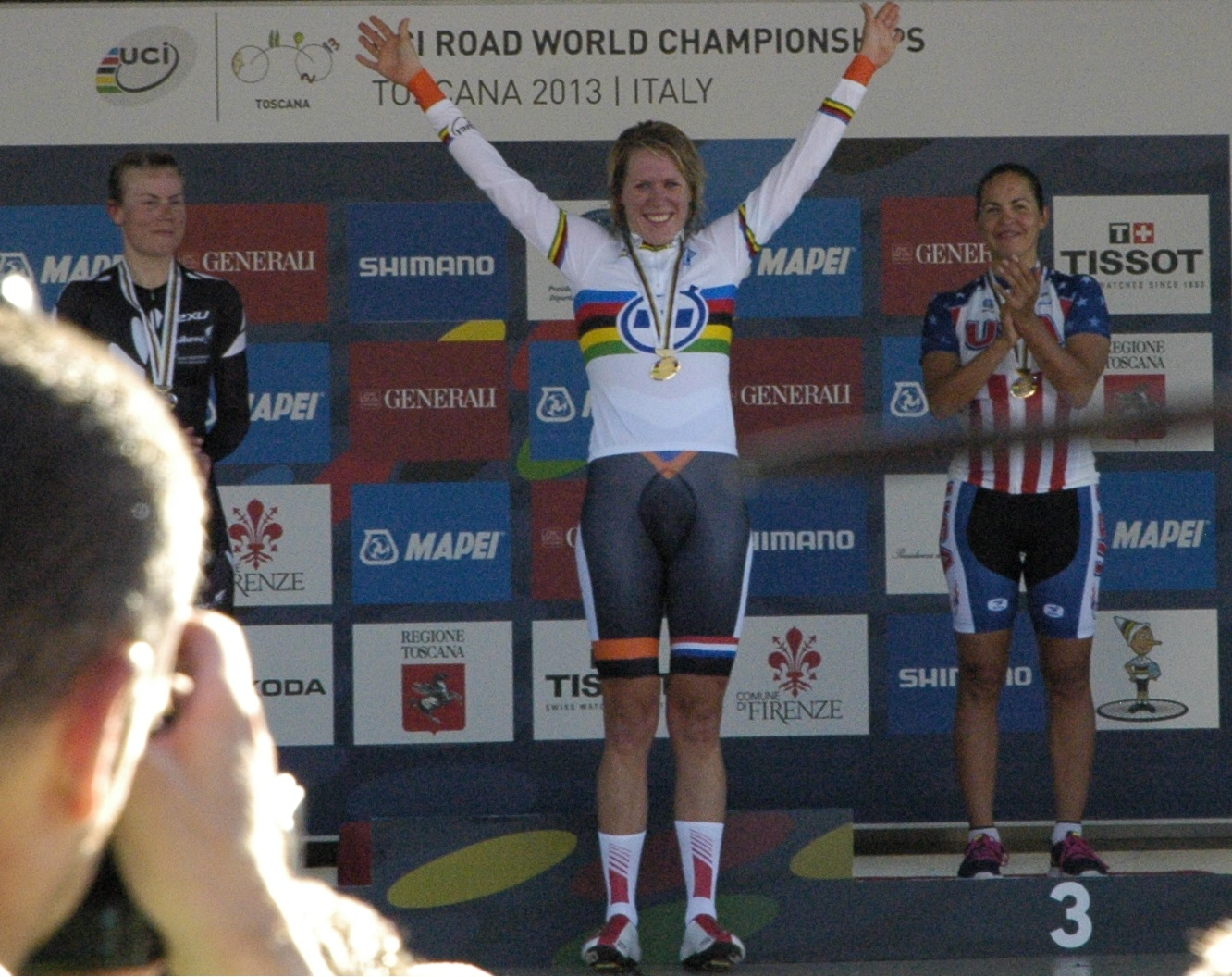
Linda Villumsen (left) finished second in the women's time trial in 2013 (Ellen van Dijk won gold and Carmen Small bronze).

Medal	Championship	Name	Event	Ref.
Gold	(France) 2000 Plouay	Jeremy Yates	Junior men's road race	
Bronze	(Spain) 2005 Madrid	Peter Latham	Men's under-23 time trial	
Gold	(Austria) 2006 Salzburg	Rebecca Spence	Junior women's time trial	
Bronze	(Australia) 2010 Melbourne and Geelong	Linda Villumsen	Women's time trial	
Silver	(Denmark) 2011 Copenhagen	Linda Villumsen	Women's time trial	
Silver	(Denmark) 2011 Copenhagen	James Oram	Junior men's time trial	
Bronze	(Netherlands) 2012 Valkenburg	Linda Villumsen	Women's time trial	
Silver	(Italy) 2013 Florence	Linda Villumsen	Women's time trial	
Gold	(United States) 2015 Richmond	Linda Villumsen	Women's time trial	
Gold	(Australia) 2022 Wollongong	Niamh Fisher-Black	Women's under-23 road race	
Silver	(Rwanda) 2025 Kigali	Nate Pringle	Men's under-23 time trial	
Silver	(Rwanda) 2025 Kigali	Niamh Fisher-Black	Women's road race	

=== Other New Zealand medalists ===
Since the 2012 UCI Road World Championships there is the men's and women's team time trial event for trade teams and these medals are included under the UCI registration country of the team. Here are listed of the medalists who won a medal with a non-New Zealand based team.

Medal	Championship	Name	Team	Event
Silver	(Netherlands) 2012 Valkenburg	Linda Villumsen	(Australia) Orica–AIS	Women's team time trial
Bronze	(Netherlands) 2012 Valkenburg	Sam Bewley	(Australia) Orica–GreenEDGE	Men's team time trial
Bronze	(Austria) 2018 Innsbruck	Patrick Bevin	(United States) BMC Racing Team	Men's team time trial

== Medal table ==
=== Medals by year ===
Championship	Gold	Silver	Bronze	Total	Rank
(France) 2000 Plouay	1	0	0	1	5
(Spain) 2005 Madrid	0	0	1	1	9
(Belgium) 2006 Salzburg	1	0	0	1	7
(Australia) 2010 Geelong and Melbourne	0	0	1	1	10
(Denmark) 2011 Copenhagen	0	2	0	2	7
(Netherlands) 2012 Valkenburg	0	0	1	1	14
(Italy) 2013 Tuscani	0	1	0	1	12
(United States) 2015 Richmond	1	0	0	1	5
(Australia) 2022 Wollongong	1	0	0	1	8
(Rwanda) 2025 Kigali	0	2	0	2	12
Total	4	5	3	12	

=== Medals by discipline ===
updated after the 2025 UCI Road World Championships

Event	Gold	Silver	Bronze	Total
Women's time trial	1	2	2	5
Men's under-23 time trial	0	1	1	2
Junior men's time trial	0	1	0	1
Junior women's time trial	1	0	0	1
Women's road race	0	1	0	1
Women's under-23 road race	1	0	0	1
Junior men's road race	1	0	0	1
Total	4	5	3	12

== Position per event ==
The table below has the highest placed rider for each event during each year.

Note: As of 2022 there has not been a New Zealand-based team for any Team Time-trial events.

Year	Elite Men's road race	Elite Men's time trial	Under-23 Men's road race	Under-23 Men's time trial	Junior Men's road race	Junior Men's time trial	Men's amateur road race	Elite Women's road race	Elite Women's time trial	Junior Women's road race	Junior Women's time trial
1921	Event did not exist	Event did not exist	Event did not exist		Event did not exist	Event did not exist	—	Event did not exist	Event did not exist	Event did not exist	Event did not exist
1922	Event did not exist	Event did not exist	Event did not exist		Event did not exist	Event did not exist	—	Event did not exist	Event did not exist	Event did not exist	Event did not exist
1923	Event did not exist	Event did not exist	Event did not exist		Event did not exist	Event did not exist	—	Event did not exist	Event did not exist	Event did not exist	Event did not exist
1924	Event did not exist	Event did not exist	Event did not exist		Event did not exist	Event did not exist	—	Event did not exist	Event did not exist	Event did not exist	Event did not exist
1925	Event did not exist	Event did not exist	Event did not exist		Event did not exist	Event did not exist	—	Event did not exist	Event did not exist	Event did not exist	Event did not exist
1926	Event did not exist	Event did not exist	Event did not exist		Event did not exist	Event did not exist	—	Event did not exist	Event did not exist	Event did not exist	Event did not exist
1927	—	Event did not exist	Event did not exist		Event did not exist	Event did not exist	—	Event did not exist	Event did not exist	Event did not exist	Event did not exist
1928	—	Event did not exist	Event did not exist		Event did not exist	Event did not exist	—	Event did not exist	Event did not exist	Event did not exist	Event did not exist
1929	—	Event did not exist	Event did not exist		Event did not exist	Event did not exist	—	Event did not exist	Event did not exist	Event did not exist	Event did not exist
1930	—	Event did not exist	Event did not exist		Event did not exist	Event did not exist	—	Event did not exist	Event did not exist	Event did not exist	Event did not exist
1931	—	Event did not exist	Event did not exist		Event did not exist	Event did not exist	—	Event did not exist	Event did not exist	Event did not exist	Event did not exist
1932	—	Event did not exist	Event did not exist		Event did not exist	Event did not exist	—	Event did not exist	Event did not exist	Event did not exist	Event did not exist
1933	—	Event did not exist	Event did not exist		Event did not exist	Event did not exist	—	Event did not exist	Event did not exist	Event did not exist	Event did not exist
1934	—	Event did not exist	Event did not exist		Event did not exist	Event did not exist	—	Event did not exist	Event did not exist	Event did not exist	Event did not exist
1935	—	Event did not exist	Event did not exist		Event did not exist	Event did not exist	—	Event did not exist	Event did not exist	Event did not exist	Event did not exist
1936	—	Event did not exist	Event did not exist		Event did not exist	Event did not exist	—	Event did not exist	Event did not exist	Event did not exist	Event did not exist
1937	—	Event did not exist	Event did not exist		Event did not exist	Event did not exist	—	Event did not exist	Event did not exist	Event did not exist	Event did not exist
1938	—	Event did not exist	Event did not exist		Event did not exist	Event did not exist	—	Event did not exist	Event did not exist	Event did not exist	Event did not exist
1939 — 1945	Not held due WW2	Event did not exist	Event did not exist		Event did not exist	Event did not exist	Not held due WW2	Event did not exist	Event did not exist	Event did not exist	Event did not exist
1946	—	Event did not exist	Event did not exist		Event did not exist	Event did not exist	—	Event did not exist	Event did not exist	Event did not exist	Event did not exist
1946	—	Event did not exist	Event did not exist		Event did not exist	Event did not exist	—	Event did not exist	Event did not exist	Event did not exist	Event did not exist
1947	—	Event did not exist	Event did not exist		Event did not exist	Event did not exist	—	Event did not exist	Event did not exist	Event did not exist	Event did not exist
1948	—	Event did not exist	Event did not exist		Event did not exist	Event did not exist	—	Event did not exist	Event did not exist	Event did not exist	Event did not exist
1949	—	Event did not exist	Event did not exist		Event did not exist	Event did not exist	—	Event did not exist	Event did not exist	Event did not exist	Event did not exist
1950	—	Event did not exist	Event did not exist		Event did not exist	Event did not exist	—	Event did not exist	Event did not exist	Event did not exist	Event did not exist
1951	—	Event did not exist	Event did not exist		Event did not exist	Event did not exist	—	Event did not exist	Event did not exist	Event did not exist	Event did not exist
1952	—	Event did not exist	Event did not exist		Event did not exist	Event did not exist	—	Event did not exist	Event did not exist	Event did not exist	Event did not exist
1953	—	Event did not exist	Event did not exist		Event did not exist	Event did not exist	—	Event did not exist	Event did not exist	Event did not exist	Event did not exist
1954	—	Event did not exist	Event did not exist		Event did not exist	Event did not exist	—	Event did not exist	Event did not exist	Event did not exist	Event did not exist
1955	—	Event did not exist	Event did not exist		Event did not exist	Event did not exist	—	Event did not exist	Event did not exist	Event did not exist	Event did not exist
1956	—	Event did not exist	Event did not exist		Event did not exist	Event did not exist	—	Event did not exist	Event did not exist	Event did not exist	Event did not exist
1957	—	Event did not exist	Event did not exist		Event did not exist	Event did not exist	—	Event did not exist	Event did not exist	Event did not exist	Event did not exist
1958	—	Event did not exist	Event did not exist		Event did not exist	Event did not exist	—	—	Event did not exist	Event did not exist	Event did not exist
1959	—	Event did not exist	Event did not exist		Event did not exist	Event did not exist	—	—	Event did not exist	Event did not exist	Event did not exist
1960	—	Event did not exist	Event did not exist		Event did not exist	Event did not exist	—	—	Event did not exist	Event did not exist	Event did not exist
1961	—	Event did not exist	Event did not exist		Event did not exist	Event did not exist	—	—	Event did not exist	Event did not exist	Event did not exist
1962	—	Event did not exist	Event did not exist		Event did not exist	Event did not exist	—	—	Event did not exist	Event did not exist	Event did not exist
1963	—	Event did not exist	Event did not exist		Event did not exist	Event did not exist	—	—	Event did not exist	Event did not exist	Event did not exist
1964	—	Event did not exist	Event did not exist		Event did not exist	Event did not exist	—	—	Event did not exist	Event did not exist	Event did not exist
1965	—	Event did not exist	Event did not exist		Event did not exist	Event did not exist	—	—	Event did not exist	Event did not exist	Event did not exist
1966	—	Event did not exist	Event did not exist		Event did not exist	Event did not exist	47	—	Event did not exist	Event did not exist	Event did not exist
1967	—	Event did not exist	Event did not exist		Event did not exist	Event did not exist	46	—	Event did not exist	Event did not exist	Event did not exist
1968	—	Event did not exist	Event did not exist		Event did not exist	Event did not exist	—	—	Event did not exist	Event did not exist	Event did not exist
1969	—	Event did not exist	Event did not exist		Event did not exist	Event did not exist	—	—	Event did not exist	Event did not exist	Event did not exist
1970	—	Event did not exist	Event did not exist		Event did not exist	Event did not exist	55	—	Event did not exist	Event did not exist	Event did not exist
1971	—	Event did not exist	Event did not exist		Event did not exist	Event did not exist	69	—	Event did not exist	Event did not exist	Event did not exist
1972	—	Event did not exist	Event did not exist		Event did not exist	Event did not exist	Not held	—	Event did not exist	Event did not exist	Event did not exist
1973	—	Event did not exist	Event did not exist		Event did not exist	Event did not exist	55	—	Event did not exist	Event did not exist	Event did not exist
1974	—	Event did not exist	Event did not exist		Event did not exist	Event did not exist	52	—	Event did not exist	Event did not exist	Event did not exist
1975	—	Event did not exist	Event did not exist		—	Event did not exist	64	—	Event did not exist	Event did not exist	Event did not exist
1976	—	Event did not exist	Event did not exist		—	Event did not exist	Not held	—	Event did not exist	Event did not exist	Event did not exist
1977	28	Event did not exist	Event did not exist		—	Event did not exist	—	—	Event did not exist	Event did not exist	Event did not exist
1978	—	Event did not exist	Event did not exist		—	Event did not exist	66	—	Event did not exist	Event did not exist	Event did not exist
1979	—	Event did not exist	Event did not exist		—	Event did not exist	—	—	Event did not exist	Event did not exist	Event did not exist
1980	—	Event did not exist	Event did not exist		—	Event did not exist	Not held	—	Event did not exist	Event did not exist	Event did not exist
1981	—	Event did not exist	Event did not exist		—	Event did not exist	62	—	Event did not exist	Event did not exist	Event did not exist
1982	—	Event did not exist	Event did not exist		—	Event did not exist	46	—	Event did not exist	Event did not exist	Event did not exist
1983	—	Event did not exist	Event did not exist		—	Event did not exist	38	—	Event did not exist	Event did not exist	Event did not exist
1984	—	Event did not exist	Event did not exist		—	Event did not exist	Not held	Not held	Event did not exist	Event did not exist	Event did not exist
1985	61	Event did not exist	Event did not exist		—	Event did not exist	—	—	Event did not exist	Event did not exist	Event did not exist
1986	—	Event did not exist	Event did not exist		—	Event did not exist	93	33	Event did not exist	Event did not exist	Event did not exist
1987	—	Event did not exist	Event did not exist		—	Event did not exist	22	17	Event did not exist	—	Event did not exist
1988	—	Event did not exist	Event did not exist		—	Event did not exist	Not held	Not held	Event did not exist	—	Event did not exist
1989	—	Event did not exist	Event did not exist		—	Event did not exist	24	5	Event did not exist	—	Event did not exist
1990	—	Event did not exist	Event did not exist		—	Event did not exist	28	4	Event did not exist	—	Event did not exist
1991	—	Event did not exist	Event did not exist		—	Event did not exist	23	37	Event did not exist	—	Event did not exist
1992	—	Event did not exist	Event did not exist		—	Event did not exist	Not held	Not held	Event did not exist	—	Event did not exist
1993	—	Event did not exist	Event did not exist		—	Event did not exist	48	22	Event did not exist	—	Event did not exist
1994	—	—	Event did not exist		—	Event did not exist	65	—	—	—	Event did not exist
1995	—	29	Event did not exist		—	Event did not exist	75	11	12	—	Event did not exist
1996	—	—	14	29	—	Event did not exist	Event no longer exists	—	—	—	Event did not exist
1997	—	—	63	42	—	—	Event no longer exists	16	19	36	—
1998	—	—	—	—	—	—	Event no longer exists	59	—	—	—
1999	—	—	53	—	—	—	Event no longer exists	16	32	—	—
2000	66	—	—	—	1	18	Event no longer exists	—	—	—	—
2001	—	—	—	—	—	—	Event no longer exists	22	31	—	—
2002	10	—	85	35	—	—	Event no longer exists	19	17	—	—
2003	—	36	—	—	40	57	Event no longer exists	35	—	—	—
2004	—	—	—	—	45	57	Event no longer exists	—	—	—	—
2005	9	—	—	3	—	—	Event no longer exists	59	26	—	—
2006	—	—	71	7	—	—	Event no longer exists	—	35	—	1
2007	—	39	98	35	—	—	Event no longer exists	15	—	—	—
2008	35	—	62	—	—	—	Event no longer exists	8	—	—	—
2009	—	50	37	23	—	—	Event no longer exists	10	—	—	—
2010	77	23	27	28	—	—	Event no longer exists	11	3	—	—
2011	121	18	80	6	41	2	Event no longer exists	111	2	18	6
2012	—	23	37	37	14	23	Event no longer exists	7	3	4	—
2013	—	21	52	26	—	—	Event no longer exists	6	2	—	15
2014	86	12	11	10	—	—	Event no longer exists	8	9	—	—
2015	58	35	70	6	—	24	Event no longer exists	22	1	44	24
2016	DNF	27	28	39	43	44	Event no longer exists	—	—	28	11
2017	129	39	78	22	63	26	Event no longer exists	21	6	—	—
2018	18	8	80	—	62	—	Event no longer exists	47	11	36	—
2019	DNF	4	85	44	32	10	Event no longer exists	59	—	31	10
2020	DNF	12	NH (Note: Due to COVID-19 only the elite events were held.)				Event no longer exists	15	12	NH (Note: Due to COVID-19 only the elite events were held.)	
2021	DNF	23	18	11	50	23	Event no longer exists	26	—	—	—

Legend
—	Did not participate
DNF	Did not finish
NH	Not held
