= 1947 UCI Road World Championships – Men's road race =

Men's Individual Road Race
1947 UCI Road World Championships
- Rainbow jersey

Race details
- Dates: 3 August 1947
- Stages: 1
- Distance: 274 km (170.3 mi)
- Winning time: 7h 28' 17"

Results
	Winner	Theo Middelkamp (NED)	(Netherlands)
	Second	Albert Sercu (BEL)	(Belgium)
	Third	Jef Janssen (NED)	(Netherlands)

The men's road race at the 1947 UCI Road World Championships was the 14th edition of the event. The race took place on Sunday 3 August 1947 in Reims, France. The race was won by Theo Middelkamp of the Netherlands.

== Final classification ==
General classification

Rank	Rider	Time
1st place, gold medalist(s)	Theo Middelkamp (NED)	7h 28' 17"
2nd place, silver medalist(s)	Albert Sercu (BEL)	+ 10"
3rd place, bronze medalist(s)	Jef Janssen (NED)	+ 10"
4	Fiorenzo Magni (ITA)	+ 10"
5	Édouard Fachleitner (FRA)	+ 44"
6	Bim Diederich (LUX)	+ 7' 20"
7	Joseph Magnani (USA)	+ 10' 40"
