= 1950 UCI Road World Championships – Men's road race =

Men's Individual Road Race
1950 UCI Road World Championships
- Rainbow jersey

Race details
- Dates: 20 August 1950
- Stages: 1
- Distance: 284 km (176.5 mi)
- Winning time: 7h 49' 54"

Results
	Winner	Briek Schotte (BEL)	(Belgium)
	Second	Theo Middelkamp (NED)	(Netherlands)
	Third	Ferdinand Kübler (SUI)	(Switzerland)

The men's road race at the 1950 UCI Road World Championships was the 17th edition of the event. The race took place on Sunday 20 August 1950 in Moorslede, Belgium. The race was won by Briek Schotte of Belgium.

== Final classification ==
General classification (1–10)

Rank	Rider	Time
1st place, gold medalist(s)	Briek Schotte (BEL)	7h 49' 54"
2nd place, silver medalist(s)	Theo Middelkamp (NED)	+ 1' 01"
3rd place, bronze medalist(s)	Ferdinand Kübler (SUI)	+ 1' 48"
4	Gerrit Schulte (NED)	+ 1' 48"
5	Louison Bobet (FRA)	+ 1' 48"
6	Albert Ramon (BEL)	+ 1' 48"
7	Stan Ockers (BEL)	+ 1' 48"
8	Émile Idée (FRA)	+ 4' 16"
9	Wim van Est (NED)	+ 9' 56"
10	Willy Kemp (LUX)	+ 9' 56"
