= UCI Road World Championships – Men's road race =

World championship one-day road cycling race

- Rainbow jersey

Race details
- Date: End of season
- Discipline: Road race
- Type: One-day
- Organiser: UCI

History
- First edition: 1927
- Editions: 92 (as of 2025)
- First winner: Alfredo Binda (ITA)
- Most wins: Alfredo Binda (ITA); Rik Van Steenbergen (BEL); Eddy Merckx (BEL); Óscar Freire (ESP); Peter Sagan (SVK); 3 times
- Most recent: Brandon McNulty (USA)

The UCI Road World Championships Elite Men's Road Race is a one-day event for professional cyclists that takes place annually. The winner is considered the World Cycling Champion (or World Road Cycling Champion) and earns the right to wear the Rainbow Jersey for a full year in road race or stage events. The event is a single mass start road race with the winner being the first across the line at the completion of the full race distance. The road race is contested by riders organized by national cycling teams as opposed to commercially sponsored trade teams, which is the standard in professional cycling.

== History ==
The first professional World Cycling Championship took place in 1927 at the Nürburgring in Germany and was won by Alfredo Binda, of Italy. In recent years, the race is held towards the end of the European season, usually following the Vuelta a España.

The elite men's race is usually won by riders on the UCI World Tour or its predecessors. However, in the past there were separate events for amateur riders, mainly from Eastern bloc countries.

For men at the elite professional level, the World Cycling Championship, along with the Tour de France, and the Giro d'Italia, forms the Triple Crown of Cycling.

=== Course ===
The event can be held over either a relatively flat course which favors cycling sprinters or over a hilly course which favors more of a climbing specialist or all-round type of cyclist. It usually involves laps of a circuit with a total race distance between 250 kilometres (160 mi) and 280 kilometres (170 mi) in length.

== Medalists ==
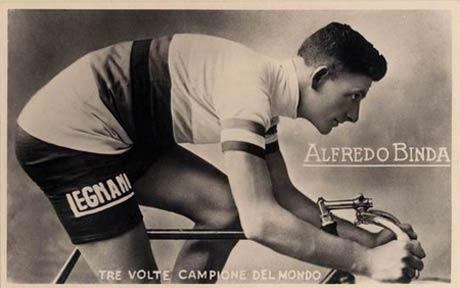
Alfredo Binda, posing with his third World Championship jersey in 1932

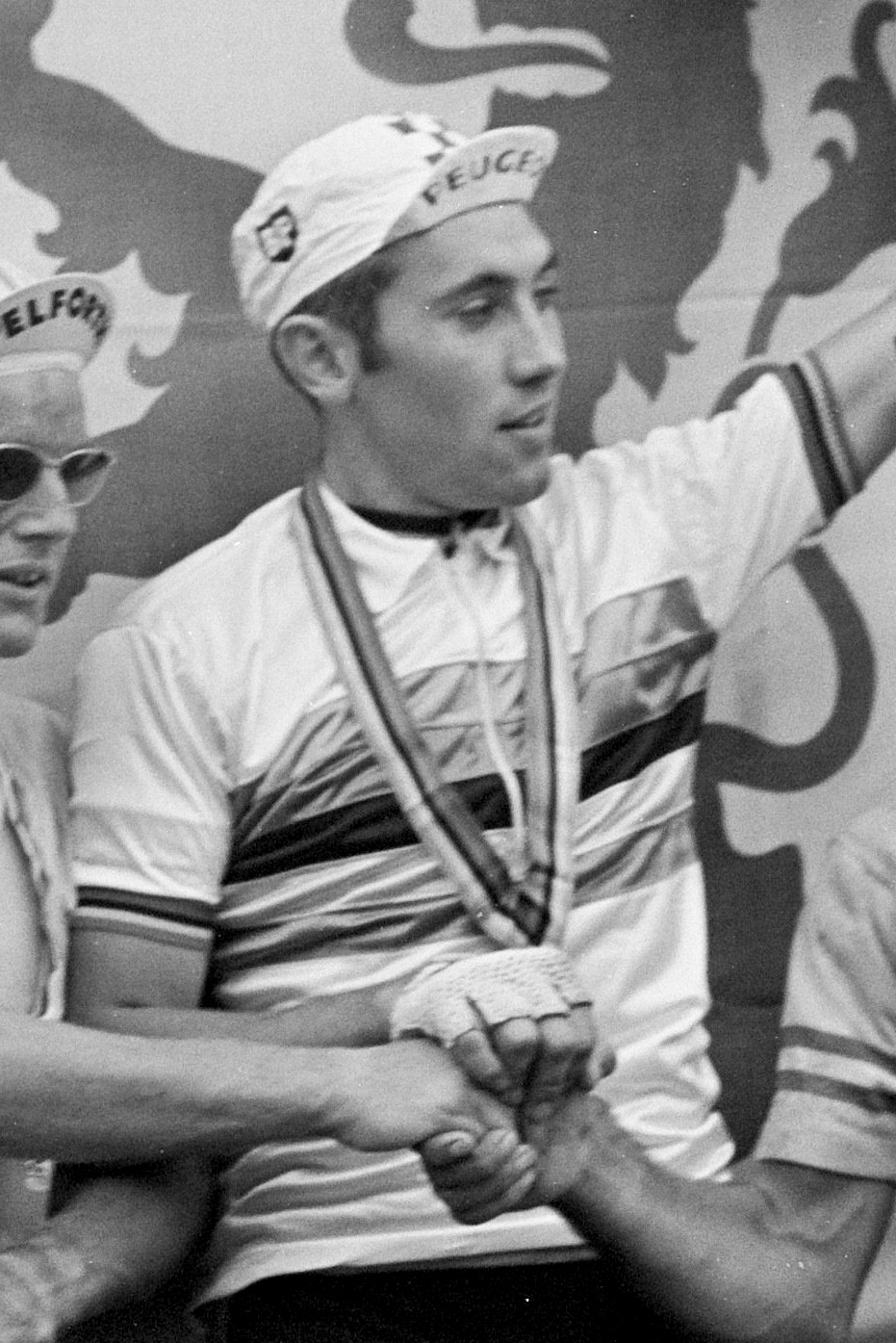
Eddy Merckx celebrating his first professional World Championship in 1967, after winning it as amateur in 1964

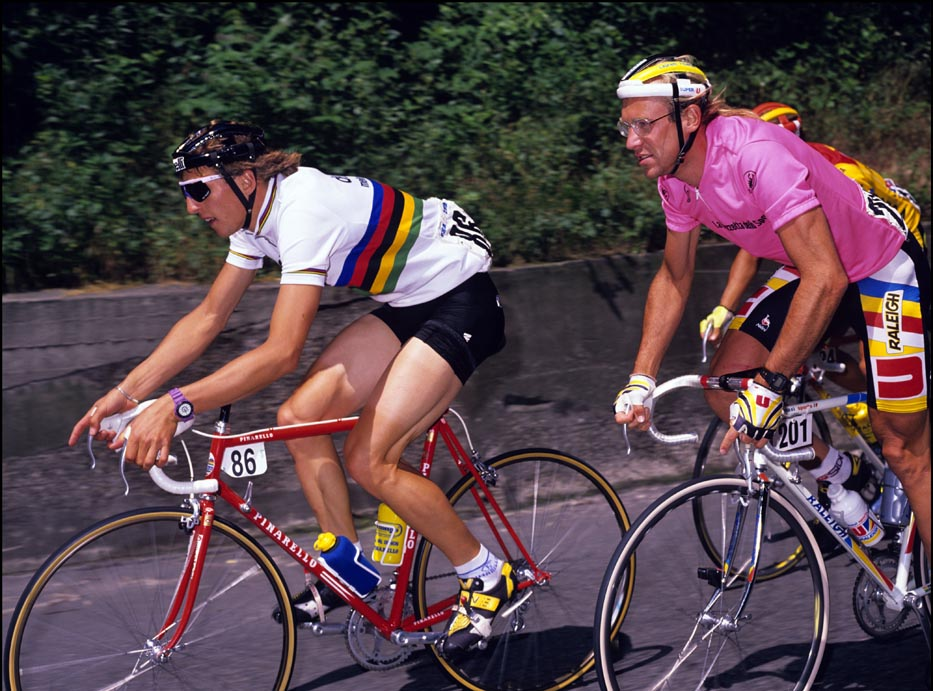
Maurizio Fondriest (left) as World Champion at the 1989 Giro d'Italia

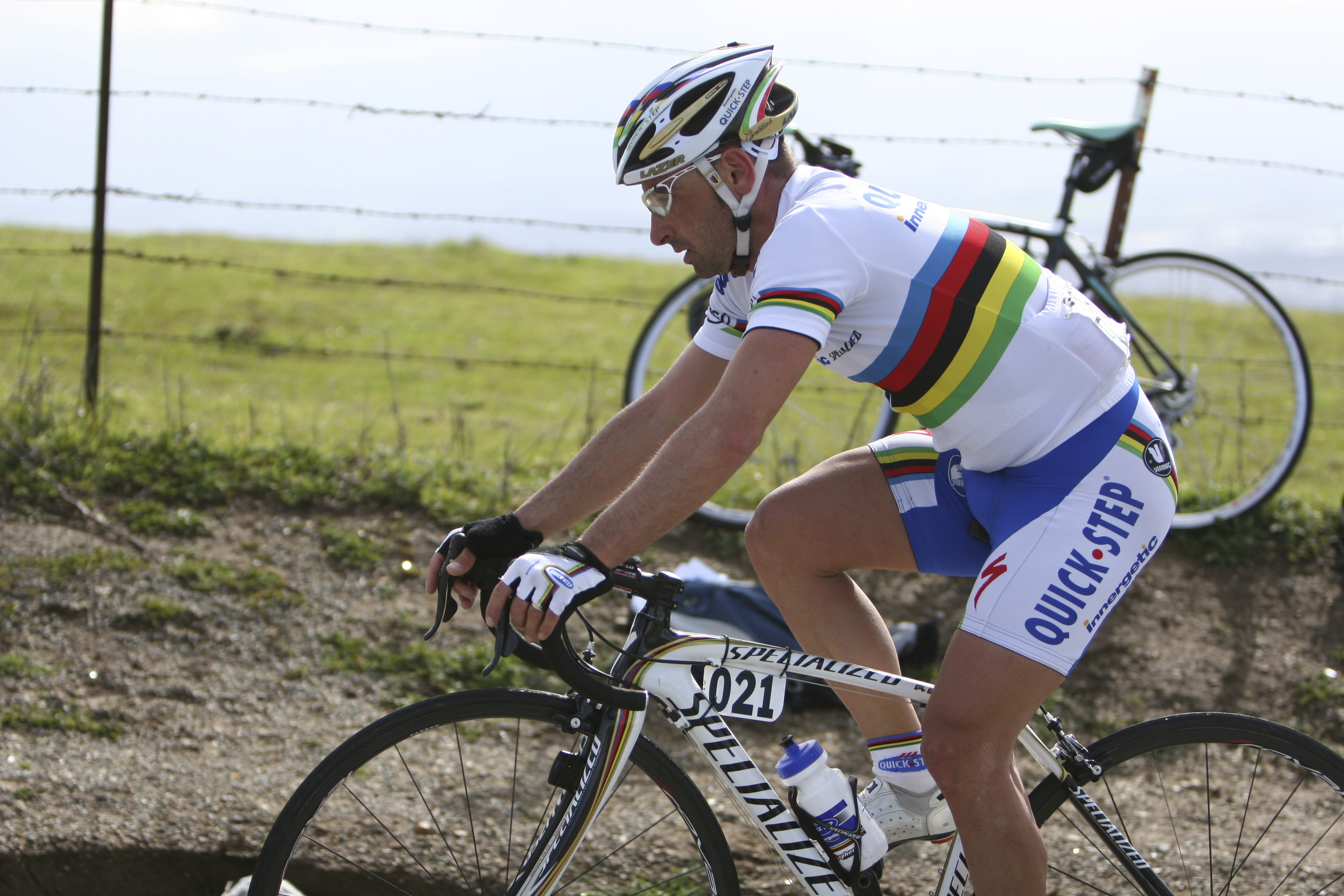
Paolo Bettini in the rainbow jersey at the 2008 Tour of California

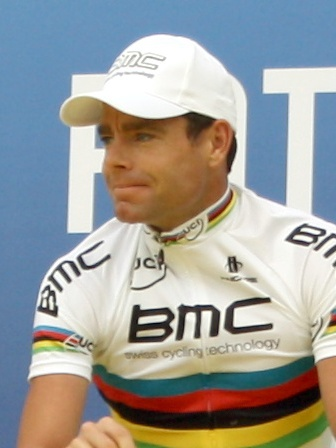
Cadel Evans in the rainbow jersey at the 2010 Tour de France

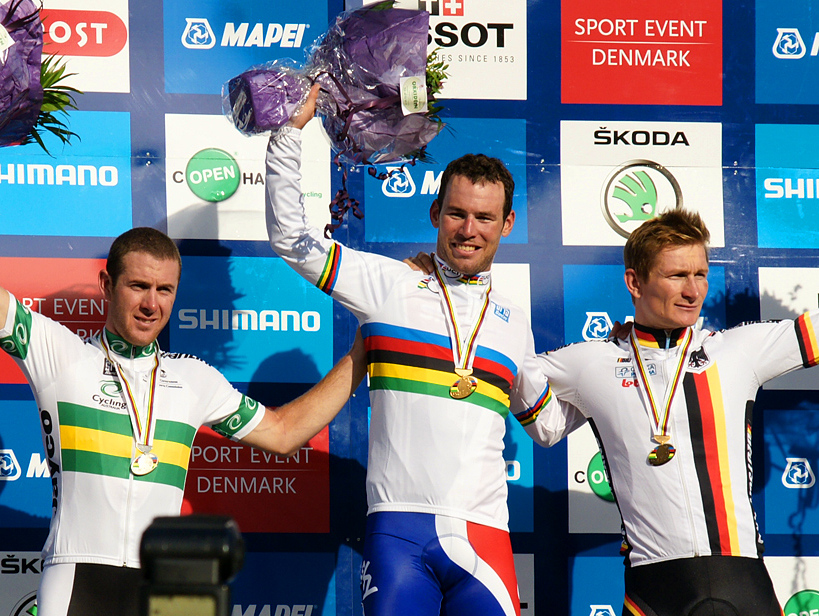
Mark Cavendish (centre) is crowned World Champion following the 2011 road race.

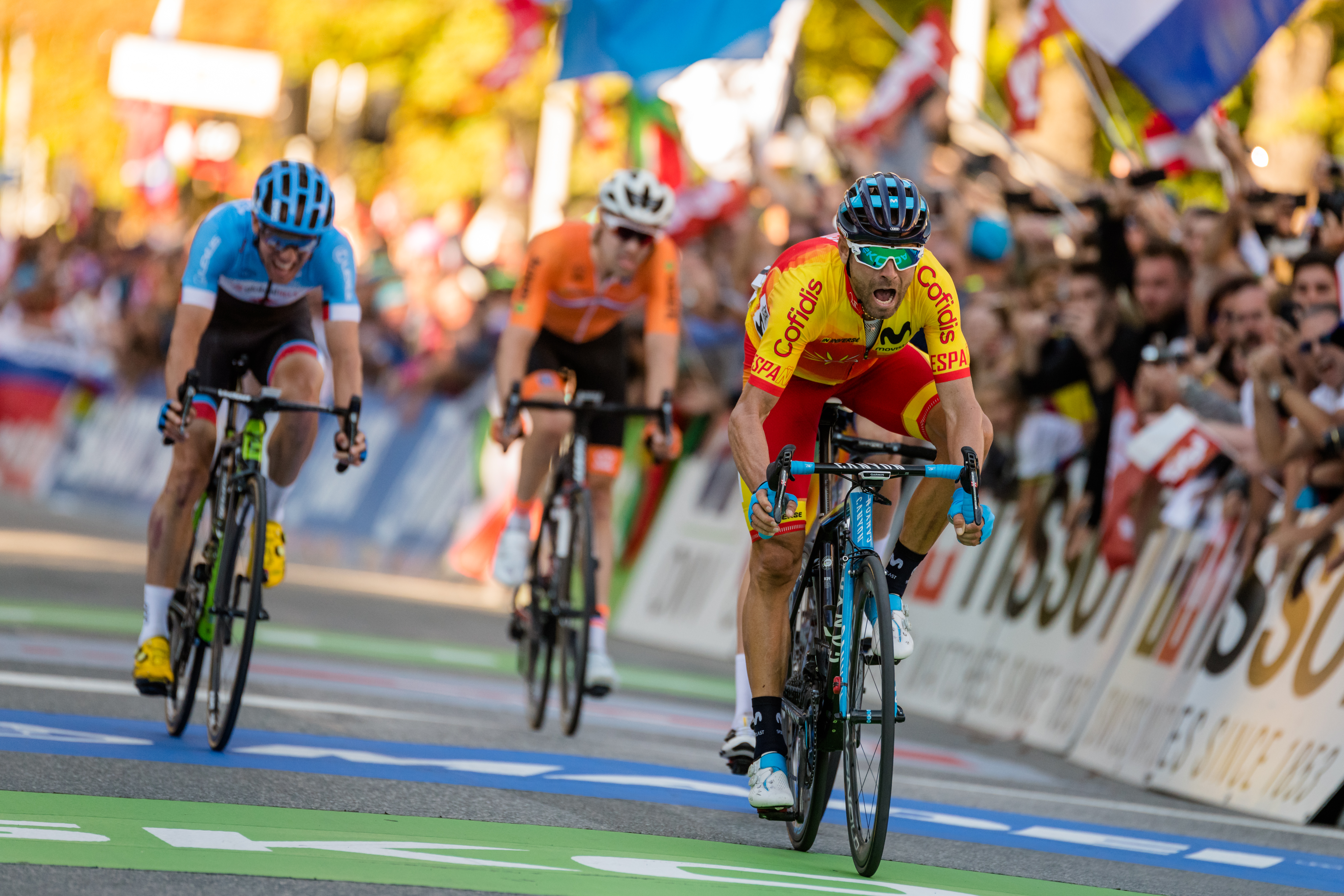
Alejandro Valverde wins the 2018 road race in Innsbruck.

Eight cyclists have successfully defended their title: Georges Ronsse (Belgium, 1928–29); Rik Van Steenbergen (Belgium, 1956–57); Rik Van Looy (Belgium, 1960–61); Gianni Bugno (Italy, 1991–92); Paolo Bettini (Italy, 2006–07), Peter Sagan (Slovakia, 2015–17), Julian Alaphilippe (France, 2020–21) and Tadej Pogačar (Slovenia, 2024–25). Sagan is the only rider with three straight titles (2015–17). Spaniard Alejandro Valverde has the most total medals by any individual rider with seven (1 gold in 2018; 2 silver in 2003, 2005; 4 bronze in 2006, 2012–14).

Men road race medalists
Championships	Gold	Silver	Bronze
1927 Nürburgring	Alfredo Binda (ITA)	Costante Girardengo (ITA)	Domenico Piemontesi (ITA)
1928 Budapest	Georges Ronsse (BEL)	Herbert Nebe (GER)	Bruno Wolke (GER)
1929 Zürich	Georges Ronsse (BEL)	Nicolas Frantz (LUX)	Alfredo Binda (ITA)
1930 Liège	Alfredo Binda (ITA)	Learco Guerra (ITA)	Georges Ronsse (BEL)
1931 Copenhagen	Learco Guerra (ITA)	Ferdinand Le Drogo (FRA)	Albert Büchi (SUI)
1932 Rome	Alfredo Binda (ITA)	Remo Bertoni (ITA)	Nicolas Frantz (LUX)
1933 Montlhéry	Georges Speicher (FRA)	Antonin Magne (FRA)	Marinus Valentijn (NED)
1934 Leipzig	Karel Kaers (BEL)	Learco Guerra (ITA)	Gustave Danneels (BEL)
1935 Floreffe	Jean Aerts (BEL)	Luciano Montero (ESP)	Gustave Danneels (BEL)
1936 Bern	Antonin Magne (FRA)	Aldo Bini (ITA)	Theo Middelkamp (NED)
1937 Copenhagen	Éloi Meulenberg (BEL)	Emil Kijewski (GER)	Paul Egli (SUI)
1938 Valkenburg	Marcel Kint (BEL)	Paul Egli (SUI)	Leo Amberg (SUI)
1946 Zürich	Hans Knecht (SUI)	Marcel Kint (BEL)	Rik Van Steenbergen (BEL)
1947 Reims	Theo Middelkamp (NED)	Albert Sercu (BEL)	Sjefke Janssen (NED)
1948 Valkenburg	Briek Schotte (BEL)	Apo Lazaridès (FRA)	Lucien Teisseire (FRA)
1949 Copenhagen	Rik Van Steenbergen (BEL)	Ferdinand Kübler (SUI)	Fausto Coppi (ITA)
1950 Moorslede	Briek Schotte (BEL)	Theo Middelkamp (NED)	Ferdinand Kübler (SUI)
1951 Varese	Ferdinand Kübler (SUI)	Fiorenzo Magni (ITA)	Antonio Bevilacqua (ITA)
1952 Luxembourg	Heinz Müller (FRG)	Gottfried Weilenmann Jr. (SUI)	Ludwig Hörmann (FRG)
1953 Lugano	Fausto Coppi (ITA)	Germain Derycke (BEL)	Stan Ockers (BEL)
1954 Solingen	Louison Bobet (FRA)	Fritz Schaer (SUI)	Charly Gaul (LUX)
1955 Frascati	Stan Ockers (BEL)	Jean-Pierre Schmitz (LUX)	Germain Derycke (BEL)
1956 Copenhagen	Rik Van Steenbergen (BEL)	Rik Van Looy (BEL)	Gerrit Schulte (NED)
1957 Waregem	Rik Van Steenbergen (BEL)	Louison Bobet (FRA)	André Darrigade (FRA)
1958 Reims	Ercole Baldini (ITA)	Louison Bobet (FRA)	André Darrigade (FRA)
1959 Zandvoort	André Darrigade (FRA)	Michele Gismondi (ITA)	Noël Foré (BEL)
1960 Karl-Marx-Stadt	Rik Van Looy (BEL)	André Darrigade (FRA)	Pino Cerami (BEL)
1961 Bern	Rik Van Looy (BEL)	Nino Defilippis (ITA)	Raymond Poulidor (FRA)
1962 Salò di Garda	Jean Stablinski (FRA)	Shay Elliott (IRL)	Jos Hoevenaers (BEL)
1963 Ronse	Benoni Beheyt (BEL)	Rik Van Looy (BEL)	Jo de Haan (NED)
1964 Sallanches	Jan Janssen (NED)	Vittorio Adorni (ITA)	Raymond Poulidor (FRA)
1965 San Sebastián	Tom Simpson (GBR)	Rudi Altig (FRG)	Roger Swerts (BEL)
1966 Nürburgring	Rudi Altig (FRG)	Jacques Anquetil (FRA)	Raymond Poulidor (FRA)
1967 Heerlen	Eddy Merckx (BEL)	Jan Janssen (NED)	Ramón Sáez (ESP)
1968 Imola	Vittorio Adorni (ITA)	Herman Van Springel (BEL)	Michele Dancelli (ITA)
1969 Zolder	Harm Ottenbros (NED)	Julien Stevens (BEL)	Michele Dancelli (ITA)
1970 Leicester	Jean-Pierre Monseré (BEL)	Leif Mortensen (DEN)	Felice Gimondi (ITA)
1971 Mendrisio	Eddy Merckx (BEL)	Felice Gimondi (ITA)	Cyrille Guimard (FRA)
1972 Gap	Marino Basso (ITA)	Franco Bitossi (ITA)	Cyrille Guimard (FRA)
1973 Barcelona	Felice Gimondi (ITA)	Freddy Maertens (BEL)	Luis Ocaña (ESP)
1974 Montreal	Eddy Merckx (BEL)	Raymond Poulidor (FRA)	Mariano Martínez (FRA)
1975 Yvoir	Hennie Kuiper (NED)	Roger De Vlaeminck (BEL)	Jean-Pierre Danguillaume (FRA)
1976 Ostuni	Freddy Maertens (BEL)	Francesco Moser (ITA)	Tino Conti (ITA)
1977 San Cristóbal	Francesco Moser (ITA)	Dietrich Thurau (FRG)	Franco Bitossi (ITA)
1978 Nürburgring	Gerrie Knetemann (NED)	Francesco Moser (ITA)	Jørgen Marcussen (DEN)
1979 Valkenburg	Jan Raas (NED)	Dietrich Thurau (FRG)	Jean-René Bernaudeau (FRA)
1980 Sallanches	Bernard Hinault (FRA)	Gianbattista Baronchelli (ITA)	Juan Fernández (ESP)
1981 Prague	Freddy Maertens (BEL)	Giuseppe Saronni (ITA)	Bernard Hinault (FRA)
1982 Goodwood	Giuseppe Saronni (ITA)	Greg LeMond (USA)	Sean Kelly (IRL)
1983 Altenrhein	Greg LeMond (USA)	Adri van der Poel (NED)	Stephen Roche (IRL)
1984 Barcelona	Claude Criquielion (BEL)	Claudio Corti (ITA)	Steve Bauer (CAN)
1985 Giavera del Montello	Joop Zoetemelk (NED)	Greg LeMond (USA)	Moreno Argentin (ITA)
1986 Colorado Springs	Moreno Argentin (ITA)	Charly Mottet (FRA)	Giuseppe Saronni (ITA)
1987 Villach	Stephen Roche (IRL)	Moreno Argentin (ITA)	Juan Fernández (ESP)
1988 Ronse	Maurizio Fondriest (ITA)	Martial Gayant (FRA)	Juan Fernández (ESP)
1989 Chambéry	Greg LeMond (USA)	Dimitri Konychev (URS)	Sean Kelly (IRL)
1990 Utsunomiya	Rudy Dhaenens (BEL)	Dirk De Wolf (BEL)	Gianni Bugno (ITA)
1991 Stuttgart	Gianni Bugno (ITA)	Steven Rooks (NED)	Miguel Induráin (ESP)
1992 Benidorm	Gianni Bugno (ITA)	Laurent Jalabert (FRA)	Dimitri Konychev (RUS)
1993 Oslo	Lance Armstrong (USA)	Miguel Induráin (ESP)	Olaf Ludwig (GER)
1994 Agrigento	Luc Leblanc (FRA)	Claudio Chiappucci (ITA)	Richard Virenque (FRA)
1995 Duitama	Abraham Olano (ESP)	Miguel Induráin (ESP)	Marco Pantani (ITA)
1996 Lugano	Johan Museeuw (BEL)	Mauro Gianetti (SUI)	Michele Bartoli (ITA)
1997 San Sebastián	Laurent Brochard (FRA)	Bo Hamburger (DEN)	Léon van Bon (NED)
1998 Valkenburg	Oscar Camenzind (SUI)	Peter Van Petegem (BEL)	Michele Bartoli (ITA)
1999 Verona	Óscar Freire (ESP)	Markus Zberg (SUI)	Jean-Cyril Robin (FRA)
2000 Plouay	Romāns Vainšteins (LAT)	Zbigniew Spruch (POL)	Óscar Freire (ESP)
2001 Lisbon	Óscar Freire (ESP)	Paolo Bettini (ITA)	Andrej Hauptman (SLO)
2002 Zolder/Hasselt	Mario Cipollini (ITA)	Robbie McEwen (AUS)	Erik Zabel (GER)
2003 Hamilton	Igor Astarloa (ESP)	Alejandro Valverde (ESP)	Peter Van Petegem (BEL)
2004 Verona	Óscar Freire (ESP)	Erik Zabel (GER)	Luca Paolini (ITA)
2005 Madrid	Tom Boonen (BEL)	Alejandro Valverde (ESP)	Anthony Geslin (FRA)
2006 Salzburg	Paolo Bettini (ITA)	Erik Zabel (GER)	Alejandro Valverde (ESP)
2007 Stuttgart	Paolo Bettini (ITA)	Alexandr Kolobnev (RUS)	Stefan Schumacher (GER)
2008 Varese	Alessandro Ballan (ITA)	Damiano Cunego (ITA)	Matti Breschel (DEN)
2009 Mendrisio	Cadel Evans (AUS)	Alexandr Kolobnev (RUS)	Joaquim Rodríguez (ESP)
2010 Geelong	Thor Hushovd (NOR)	Matti Breschel (DEN)	Allan Davis (AUS)
2011 Copenhagen	Mark Cavendish (GBR)	Matthew Goss (AUS)	André Greipel (GER)
2012 Valkenburg	Philippe Gilbert (BEL)	Edvald Boasson Hagen (NOR)	Alejandro Valverde (ESP)
2013 Florence	Rui Costa (POR)	Joaquim Rodríguez (ESP)	Alejandro Valverde (ESP)
2014 Ponferrada	Michał Kwiatkowski (POL)	Simon Gerrans (AUS)	Alejandro Valverde (ESP)
2015 Richmond	Peter Sagan (SVK)	Michael Matthews (AUS)	Ramūnas Navardauskas (LTU)
2016 Doha	Peter Sagan (SVK)	Mark Cavendish (GBR)	Tom Boonen (BEL)
2017 Bergen	Peter Sagan (SVK)	Alexander Kristoff (NOR)	Michael Matthews (AUS)
2018 Innsbruck	Alejandro Valverde (ESP)	Romain Bardet (FRA)	Michael Woods (CAN)
2019 Yorkshire	Mads Pedersen (DEN)	Matteo Trentin (ITA)	Stefan Küng (SUI)
2020 Imola	Julian Alaphilippe (FRA)	Wout van Aert (BEL)	Marc Hirschi (SUI)
2021 Flanders	Julian Alaphilippe (FRA)	Dylan van Baarle (NED)	Michael Valgren (DEN)
2022 Wollongong	Remco Evenepoel (BEL)	Christophe Laporte (FRA)	Michael Matthews (AUS)
2023 Glasgow	Mathieu van der Poel (NED)	Wout van Aert (BEL)	Tadej Pogačar (SLO)
2024 Zurich	Tadej Pogačar (SLO)	Ben O'Connor (AUS)	Mathieu van der Poel (NED)
2025 Kigali	Tadej Pogačar (SLO)	Remco Evenepoel (BEL)	Ben Healy (IRL)
2026 Montreal	Brandon McNulty (USA)	Michael Matthews (AUS)	Mathieu van der Poel (NED)

=== Most successful riders ===
Rank	Name and country	Gold	Silver	Bronze	Total	Winning years
1	Alfredo Binda (ITA)	3	0	1	4	1927, 1930, 1932
1	Rik Van Steenbergen (BEL)	3	0	1	4	1949, 1956, 1957
1	Óscar Freire (ESP)	3	0	1	4	1999, 2001, 2004
4	Eddy Merckx (BEL)	3	0	0	3	1967, 1971, 1974
4	Peter Sagan (SVK)	3	0	0	3	2015, 2016, 2017
6	Rik Van Looy (BEL)	2	2	0	4	1960, 1961
6	Greg LeMond (USA)	2	2	0	4	1983, 1989
8	Freddy Maertens (BEL)	2	1	0	3	1976, 1981
8	Paolo Bettini (ITA)	2	1	0	3	2006, 2007
10	Georges Ronsse (BEL)	2	0	1	3	1928, 1929
10	Gianni Bugno (ITA)	2	0	1	3	1991, 1992
10	Tadej Pogačar (SLO)	2	0	1	3	2024, 2025
12	Briek Schotte (BEL)	2	0	0	2	1948, 1950
12	Julian Alaphilippe (FRA)	2	0	0	2	2020, 2021
14	Alejandro Valverde (ESP)	1	2	4	7	2018
15	Learco Guerra (ITA)	1	2	0	3	1931
15	Louison Bobet (FRA)	1	2	0	3	1954
15	Francesco Moser (ITA)	1	2	0	3	1977
18	André Darrigade (FRA)	1	1	2	4	1959
19	Theo Middelkamp (NED)	1	1	1	3	1947
19	Ferdinand Kübler (SUI)	1	1	1	3	1951
19	Felice Gimondi (ITA)	1	1	1	3	1973
19	Giuseppe Saronni (ITA)	1	1	1	3	1982
19	Moreno Argentin (ITA)	1	1	1	3	1986
24	Mathieu van der Poel (NED)	1	0	2	3	2023

=== Medals per country ===
Rank	Nation	Gold	Silver	Bronze	Total
1	Belgium (BEL)	27	14	12	53
2	Italy (ITA)	19	21	16	56
3	France (FRA)	10	13	15	38
4	Netherlands (NED)	8	5	8	21
5	Spain (ESP)	6	6	12	24
6	United States (USA)	4	2	0	6
7	Switzerland (SUI)	3	6	6	15
8	Slovakia (SVK)	3	0	0	3
9	Germany (GER)^{[a]}	2	7	6	15
10	Great Britain (GBR)	2	1	0	3
11	Slovenia (SLO)	2	0	2	4
12	Australia (AUS)	1	6	3	10
13	Denmark (DEN)	1	3	3	7
14	Norway (NOR)	1	2	0	3
15	Ireland (IRL)	1	1	4	6
16	Poland (POL)	1	1	0	2
17	Latvia (LAT)	1	0	0	1
17	Portugal (POR)	1	0	0	1
19	Russia (RUS)^{[b]}	0	3	1	4
20	Luxembourg (LUX)	0	2	2	4
21	Canada (CAN)	0	0	2	2
22	Lithuania (LTU)	0	0	1	1
Totals (22 entries)		93	93	93	279

Notes

- ^[a]Includes West Germany and Nazi Germany
- ^[b]Includes USSR

== See also ==
- UCI Road World Championships
- GP Wolber
