= 1936 UCI Road World Championships – Men's road race =

Men's Individual Road Race
1936 UCI Road World Championships
- Rainbow jersey

Race details
- Dates: 6 September 1936
- Stages: 1
- Distance: 218 km (135.5 mi)
- Winning time: 5h 53' 32"

Results
	Winner	Antonin Magne (FRA)	(France)
	Second	Aldo Bini (ITA)	(Italy)
	Third	Theo Middelkamp (NED)	(Netherlands)

The men's road race at the 1936 UCI Road World Championships was the tenth edition of the event. The race took place on Sunday 6 September 1936 in Bern, Switzerland. The race was won by Antonin Magne of France.

== Final classification ==
General classification

Rank	Rider	Time
1st place, gold medalist(s)	Antonin Magne (FRA)	5h 53' 32"
2nd place, silver medalist(s)	Aldo Bini (ITA)	+ 9' 27"
3rd place, bronze medalist(s)	Theo Middelkamp (NED)	+ 9' 27"
4	Paul Egli (SUI)	+ 9' 27"
5	Werner Grundhal Hansen (DEN)	+ 9' 27"
6	Edward Vissers (BEL)	+ 9' 27"
7	Gino Bartali (ITA)	+ 9' 27"
8	Albert van Schendel (NED)	+ 9' 27"
9	Georg Umbenhauer (GER)	+ 9' 27"
