= 1955 UCI Road World Championships – Men's road race =

Men's Individual Road Race
1955 UCI Road World Championships
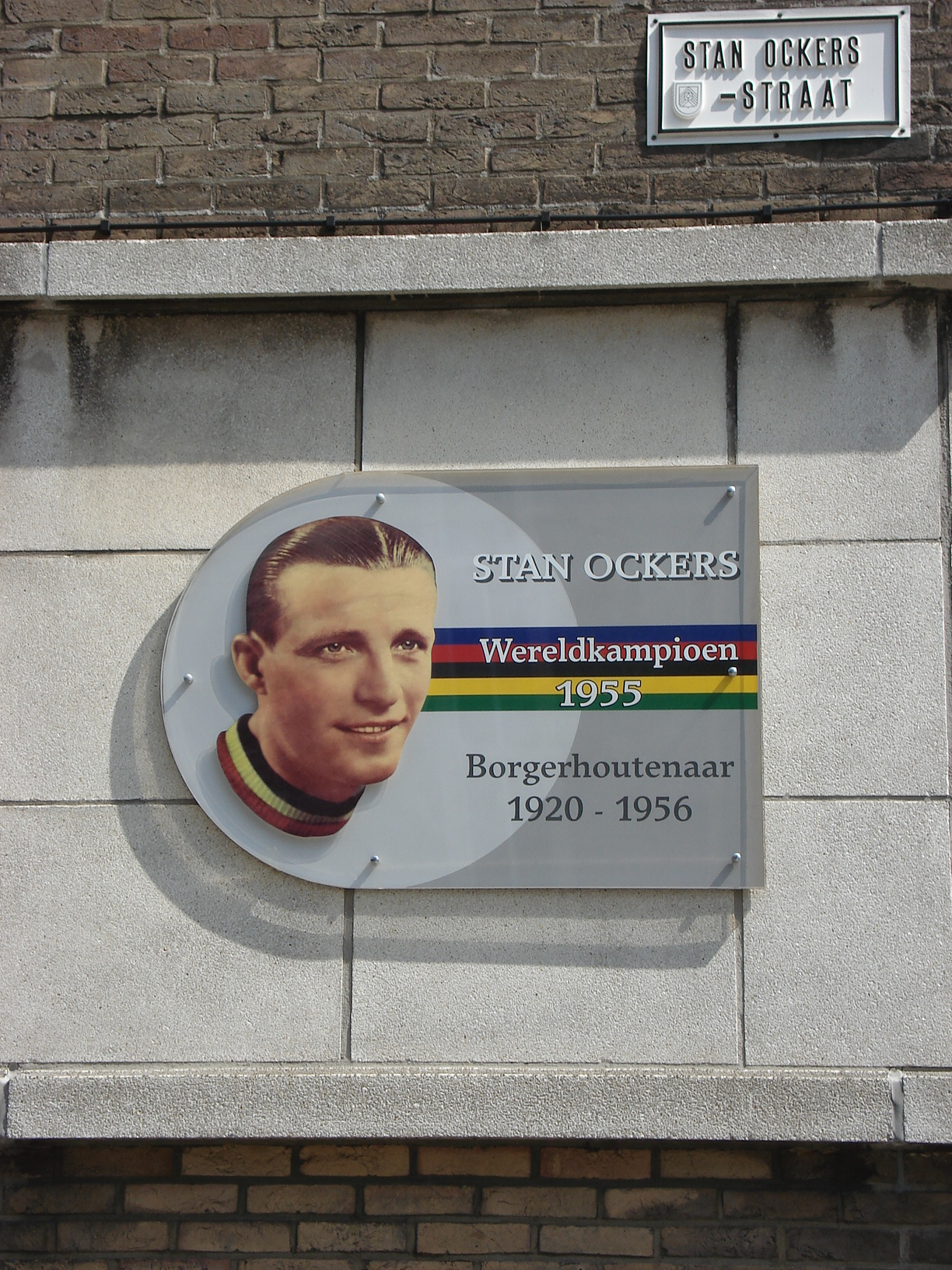
- Memorial plaque to world champion Stan Ockers in Borgerhout

Race details
- Dates: 28 August 1955
- Stages: 1
- Distance: 293.1 km (182.1 mi)
- Winning time: 8h 43' 29"

Results
	Winner	Stan Ockers (BEL)	(Belgium)
	Second	Jean-Pierre Schmitz (LUX)	(Luxembourg)
	Third	Germain Derycke (BEL)	(Belgium)

The men's road race at the 1955 UCI Road World Championships was the 22nd edition of the event. The race took place on Sunday 28 August 1955 in Frascati, Italy. The race was won by Stan Ockers of Belgium.

== Final classification ==
General classification (1–10)

Rank	Rider	Time
1st place, gold medalist(s)	Stan Ockers (BEL)	8h 43' 29"
2nd place, silver medalist(s)	Jean-Pierre Schmitz (LUX)	+ 1' 03"
3rd place, bronze medalist(s)	Germain Derycke (BEL)	+ 1' 15"
4	Gastone Nencini (ITA)	+ 1' 15"
5	Marcel Janssens (BEL)	+ 1' 40"
6	Jacques Anquetil (FRA)	+ 1' 40"
7	Pasquale Fornara (ITA)	+ 1' 50"
8	Raphaël Géminiani (FRA)	+ 2' 45"
9	Antonin Rolland (FRA)	+ 7' 35"
10	Bruno Monti (ITA)	+ 12' 52"
