= Theo Middelkamp =

Dutch cyclist

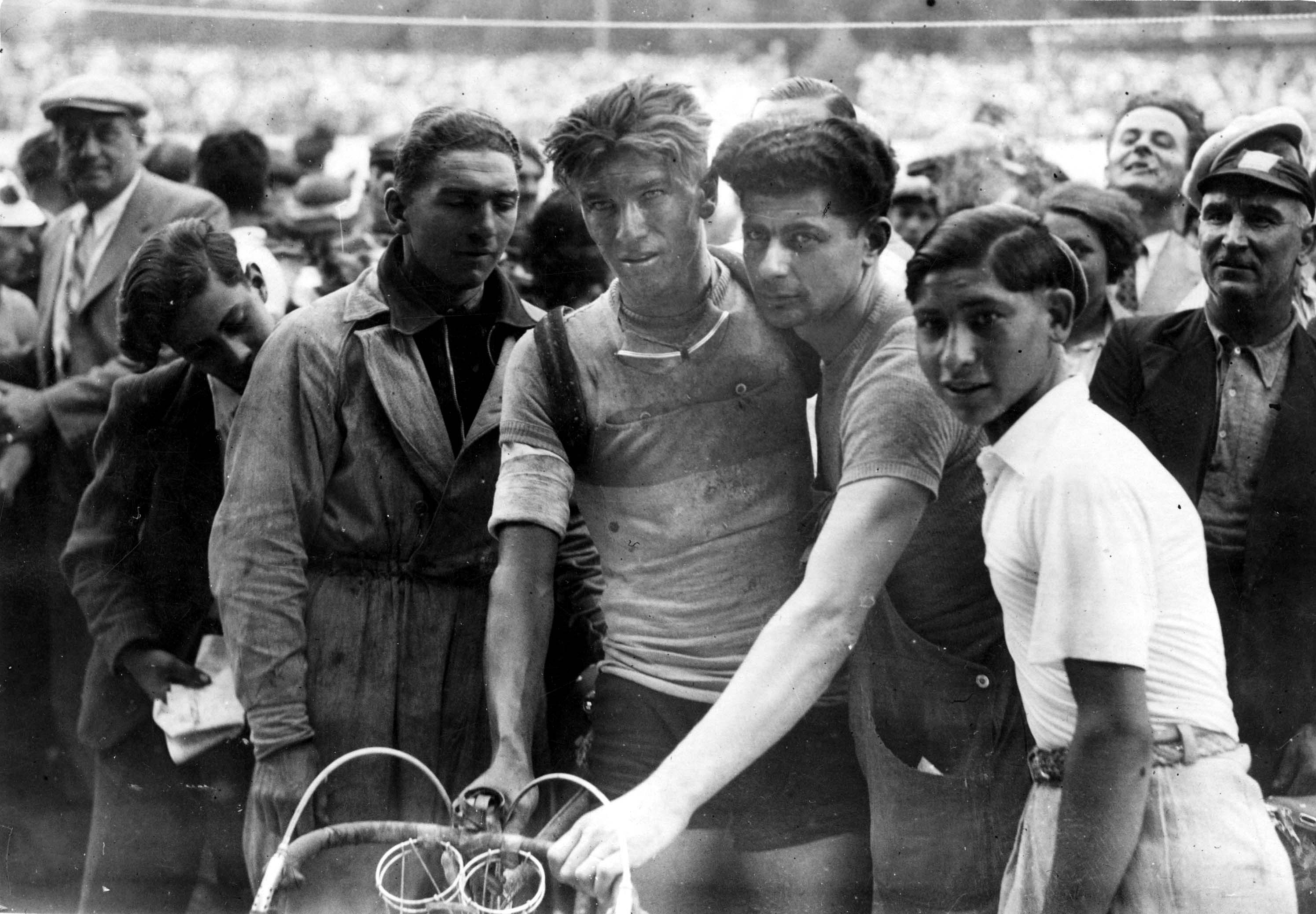

Personal information
- Full name: Theofiel Middelkamp
- Nicknames: de Fiel, Fiel Boel
- Born: 23 February 1914 Nieuw-Namen, the Netherlands
- Died: 2 May 2005 (aged 91) Kieldrecht, Belgium

Cycling career
- Sport: Cycling
- Discipline: Road
- Role: Rider

Major wins
- Grand Tours Tour de France 2 individual stages (1936, 1938) One-day races and Classics World Road Race Championships (1947) National Road Race Championships (1938, 1943, 1945)
Medal record
Men's road bicycle racing
Representing Netherlands
World Championships
Gold medal – first place	1947 Reims	Elite Road Race
Silver medal – second place	1950 Moorslede	Elite Road Race
Bronze medal – third place	1936 Bern	Elite Road Race

Theofiel Middelkamp (23 February 1914 – 2 May 2005) was a Dutch road cyclist. In 1947, Middelkamp became world champion. In 1936, he was the first Dutch cyclist ever to win a stage in the Tour de France.

== Biography ==
Middelkamp was born as the second son in a family of nine children. At an early age, he wanted to be a footballer, but he soon realised that there was much more money to be earned in cycling, as football was not yet a professional sport in the Netherlands.

Middelkamp was the first Dutchman to win a stage in the Tour de France. When he came to the Tour, he had never even seen mountains, coming from the very flat parts of the Netherlands. However, in his first Tour, on 14 July 1936, he won the difficult mountain stage from Aix-les-Bains to Grenoble, which went over the Col du Galibier. That year, he finished 23rd overall. In 1937 he had to quit the Tour because of a fall, in which he broke a finger.

In 1938 he won the seventh stage (Bayonne-Pau). In that tour, he won 8,000 francs, much less than he could have earned in races in Flanders, and so he decided not to participate in any later Tours. As Middelkamp famously said, "I cannot live on fame and honour".

During the Second World War, Middelkamp earned money by smuggling, but he was caught and spent several months in prison. After the war, he went back to full-time cycling.

In 1947, Middelkamp became the first Dutch world champion on the road, in Reims, after having been close to that title in the previous year.

Middelkamp ended his career in 1951, when he bought a pub in Kieldrecht. For a long time, he would not talk to journalists about his cycling years, until he spoke about his famous 1936 stage win in a television program in 2003. Middelkamp died in 2005.

== Major results ==
1935
5th Kampioenschap van Vlaanderen
1936
1st GP Stad Vilvoorde
1st Stage 7 Tour de France
3rd Road race, UCI Road World Championships
1938
1st Road race, National Road Championships
1st Stage 7 Tour de France
1943
1st Road race, National Road Championships
1944
2nd Grand Prix Jules Lowie
3rd Road race, National Road Championships
1945
1st Road race, National Road Championships
1st Nationale Sluitingsprijs
10th Circuit des Onze Villes
1946
2nd Road race, National Road Championships
10th Scheldeprijs
1947
1st Road race, UCI Road World Championships
3rd Scheldeprijs
1948
1st GP Stad Vilvoorde
3rd Road race, National Road Championships
3rd Scheldeprijs
1950
2nd Road race, UCI Road World Championships
10th Overall Ronde van Nederland

=== Grand Tour general classification results timeline ===
Grand Tour	1936	1937	1938
Giro d'Italia	—	—	—
Tour de France	23	DNF	43
Vuelta a España	—	—	—

Legend
—	Did not compete
DNF	Did not finish
