= Gerard van Beek =

Dutch track cyclist

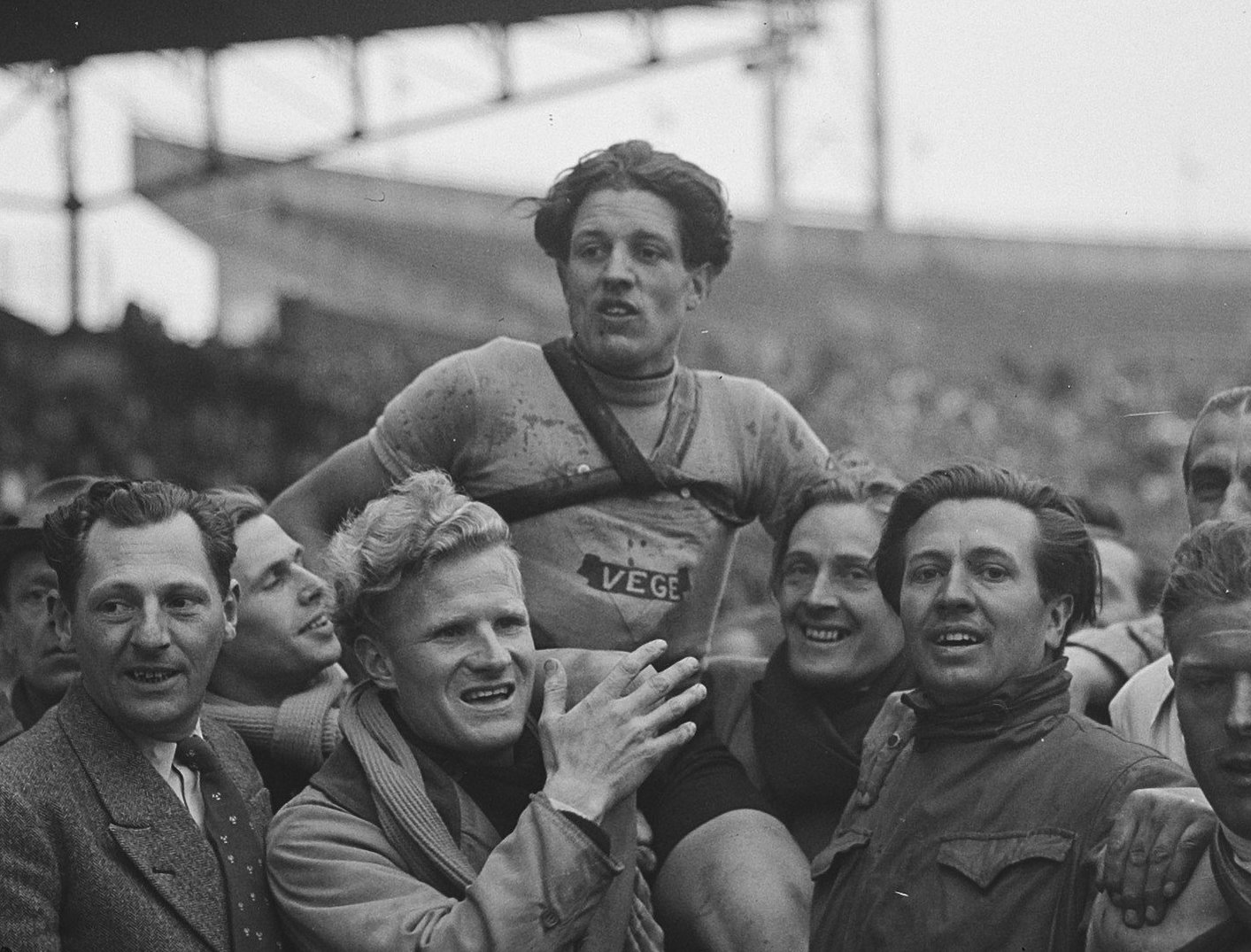

Personal information
- Full name: Gerardus Johannes Willibrordus van Beek
- Nationality: Dutch
- Born: 1 November 1923 Volendam, Netherlands
- Died: 15 March 1951 (aged 27) Berlin, Germany

Sport
- Sport: Road cycling

Gerard van Beek (1 November 1923 — 15 March 1951) was a Dutch road cyclist. He won the bronze medal in the amateurs road race at the 1947 UCI Road World Championships. In 1948 and 1949 he won the final stage in the Ronde van Nederland.

Van Beek grew up in Oostzaan, and road for the local cycling team D.T.S., but did not participate in races for a while, because he did not dare to, as he said later. When he did start racing he was an immediate success, and won the Ronde of Noord-Holland in 1947, and a road race from Amsterdam to Arnhem and back. In that year's world championship, in Reims, he finished third, behind two Italian racers.

Van Beek became professional in 1947, after winning the bronze medal as an amateur at the 1947 UCI Road World Championships. He was selected for the 1948 Tour de France and was chosen as a substitute for the 1948 UCI Road World Championships, for professionals. In 1948 and 1949 he won the final stage in the Ronde van Nederland, and in 1949 he lost in the final of the Dutch championship to Wim van Est, after defeating Gerrit Schulte in the semi-final. After that, he became more of a track racer. In 1950 he finished third in the 50k race at the Dutch championships, and did couple races, particularly in Germany, with Cor Bakker and with Arie Vooren.

On 15 March 1951 he had a flat tire and crashed during a six-day race in Berlin, and died later in the hospital.

Van Beek was well known in his community as a progressive working-class person, participating in local pacifist groups; he was one of the first signatories for a remembrance of the February strike.

== See also ==
- List of racing cyclists and pacemakers with a cycling-related death
