= 1984 UCI Road World Championships – Men's road race =

Men's Individual Road Race
1984 UCI Road World Championships
- Rainbow jersey

Race details
- Dates: 2 September 1984
- Stages: 1
- Distance: 255.55 km (158.8 mi)
- Winning time: 6h 46' 46"

Results
	Winner	Claude Criquielion (BEL)	(Belgium)
	Second	Claudio Corti (ITA)	(Italy)
	Third	Steve Bauer (CAN)	(Canada)

The men's road race at the 1984 UCI Road World Championships was the 51st edition of the event. The race took place on Sunday 2 September 1984 in Barcelona, Spain. The race was won by Claude Criquielion of Belgium.

== Final classification ==
General classification (1–10)

Rank	Rider	Time
1st place, gold medalist(s)	Claude Criquielion (BEL)	6h 46' 46"
2nd place, silver medalist(s)	Claudio Corti (ITA)	+ 14"
3rd place, bronze medalist(s)	Steve Bauer (CAN)	+ 1' 01"
4	Hubert Seiz (SUI)	+ 1' 01"
5	Bernard Bourreau (FRA)	+ 1' 01"
6	Robert Millar (GBR)	+ 1' 08"
7	Éric Caritoux (FRA)	+ 1' 12"
8	Palmiro Masciarelli (ITA)	+ 1' 12"
9	Federico Echave (ESP)	+ 1' 12"
10	Joop Zoetemelk (NED)	+ 1' 12"
