= Sante Ranucci =

Italian cyclist (1933–2023)

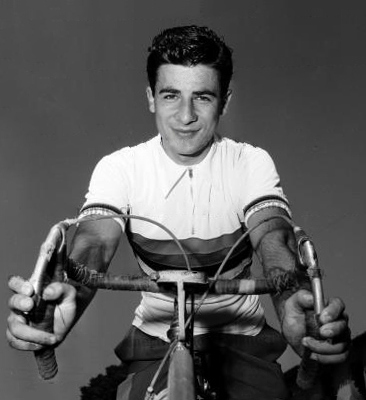
- Ranucci in 1955

Personal information
- Born: 31 October 1933 Montefiascone, Italy
- Died: 20 May 2023 (aged 89) Scandicci, Italy

Sport
- Sport: Cycling
- Event: Road
Medal record
Representing Italy
World Championships
Gold medal – first place	1955 Frascati	Road race

Sante Ranucci (31 October 1933 – 20 May 2023) was an Italian cyclist who won the amateur road race at the 1955 UCI Road World Championships. After that, he competed as a professional until 1964. In 1958, he finished second in the Giro del Lazio.

Ranucci died in Scandicci on 20 May 2023, at the age of 89.
