= UCI Road World Championships =

Annual world championships for bicycle road racing

- Status: Active
- Genre: Road bicycle racing
- Date: August–September
- Frequency: Annually
- Location: Various
- Inaugurated: 1921
- Previous event: 2025
- Next event: 2026
- Organiser: UCI
- 2026 UCI Road World Championships

The UCI Road World Championships are the annual world championships for bicycle road racing organized by the Union Cycliste Internationale (UCI). The UCI Road World Championships consist of events for road race and individual time trial, and as of 2019, a mixed team relay.

== Events ==
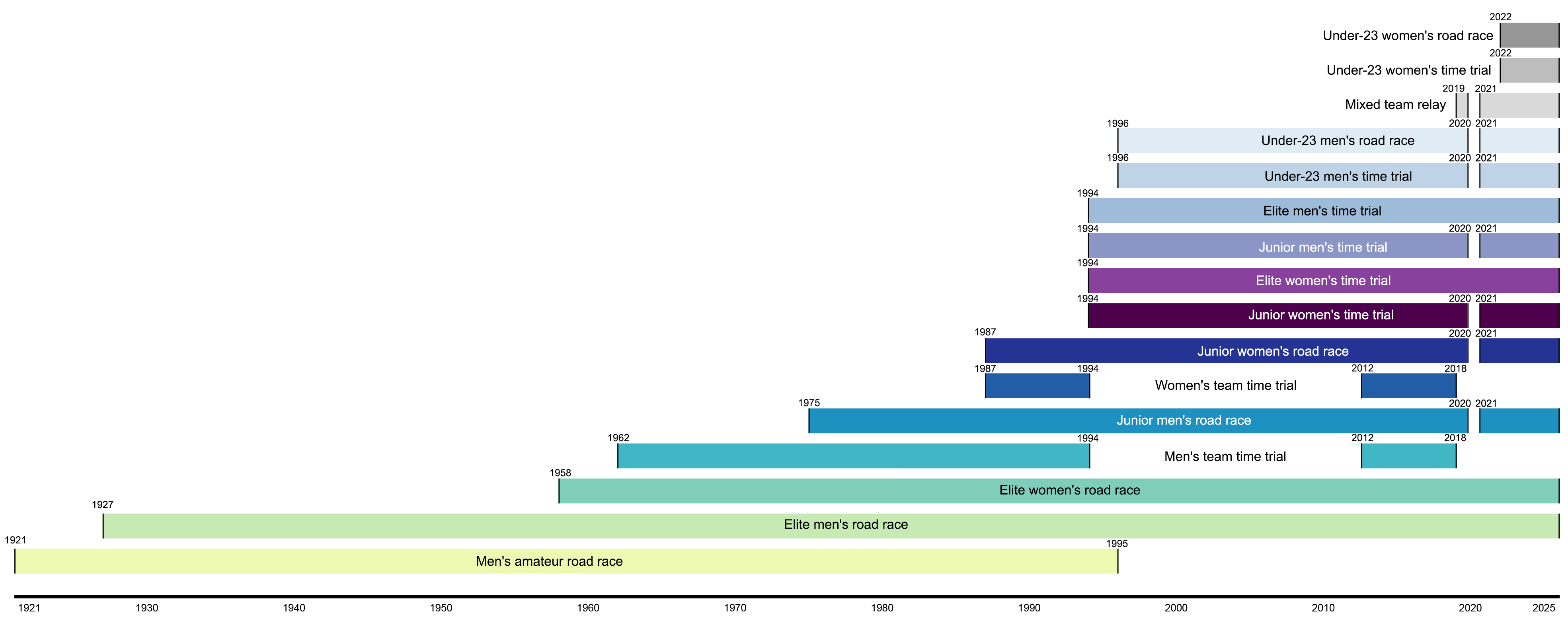
Timeline of the UCI Road World Championships Races (1921-2025)

All the world championship events are ridden by national teams, not trade teams such as in most other major races. The winner of each category is entitled to wear the rainbow jersey in races of that category (either mass start or time trial) until the next championships. It currently includes the following championships:

- Elite Men's road race
- Elite Men's time trial
- Under-23 Men's road race
- Under-23 Men's time trial
- Junior Men's road race
- Junior Men's time trial
- Elite Women's road race
- Elite Women's time trial
- Under-23 Women's road race
- Under-23 Women's time trial
- Junior Women's road race
- Junior Women's time trial
- Mixed team relay

Former events:

- Men's amateur road race (1921–1995)
- Men's team time trial (1962–2018)
- Women's team time trial (1987–2018)

== History ==
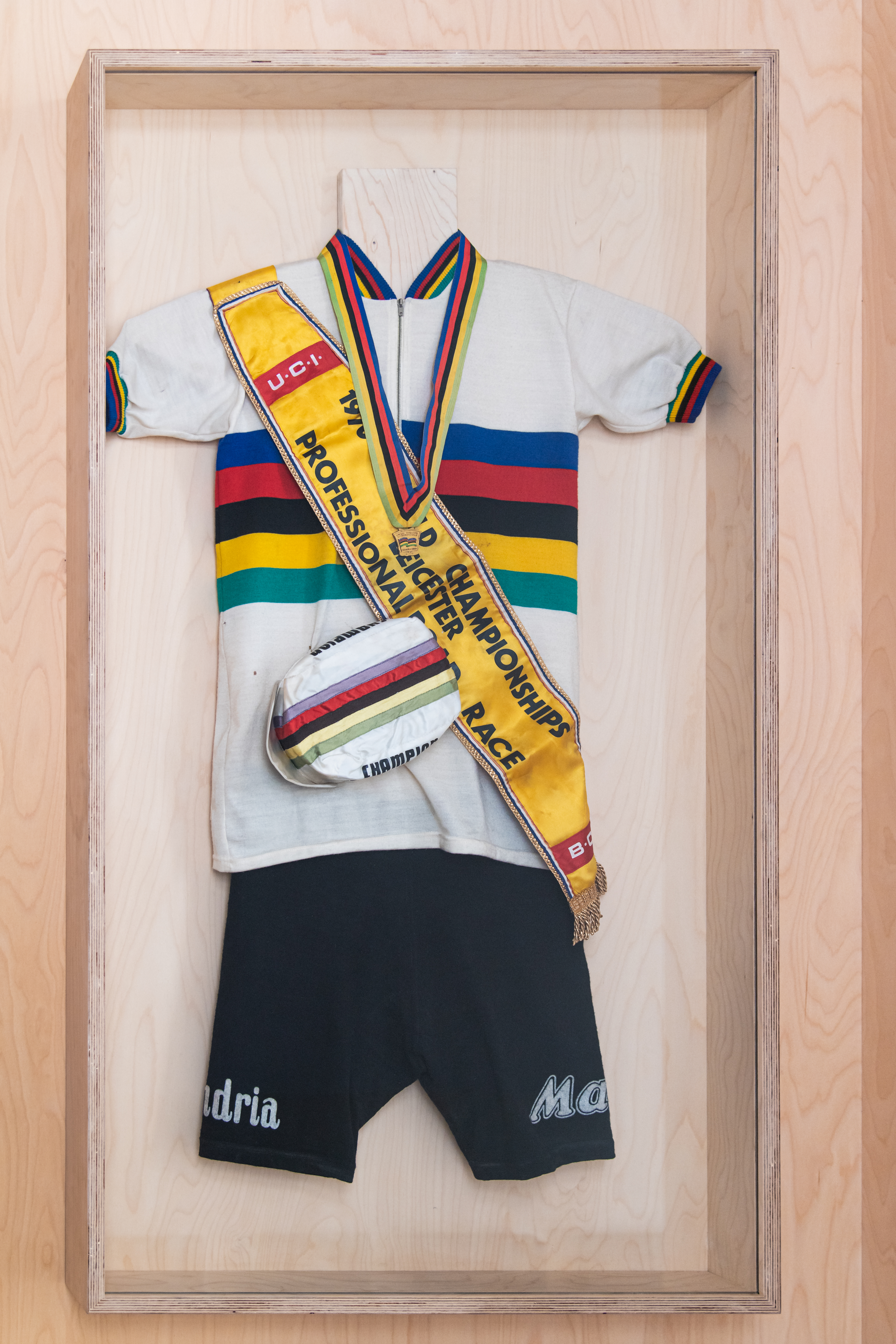
Outfit of Jean-Pierre Monseré as world champion (1970), consisting of victory ribbon, cap, medal and rainbow jersey (collection KOERS. Museum of Cycle Racing)

The first world championships took place in 1921, though the only event that was contested was the men's road race for amateurs. The first professional world championship took place in July 1927 at the Nürburgring in Germany where Italian Alfredo Binda won the professional men's race and Belgian Jean Aerts won the men's amateur race. The women's road race was introduced in 1958. A men's team time trial, contested by national teams, was introduced in 1962. Beginning in 1972, the team time trial was discontinued in Olympic years only. Individual time trials in all categories were added in 1994, which was also the last year for the original incarnation of the men's team time trial. In 2012, the men's team time trial was reinstated, and a women's team time trial added to the program; both were contested by trade teams. In 2019, the team time trial events for men and women were replaced by a mixed relay team time trial. In 2020, no under-23 or junior races were contested at the Championships owing to the COVID-19 pandemic; however, under-23 riders were eligible to compete in the elite races.

Until 1995, there were separate races for male professional and amateur riders. In 1996, the amateur category was replaced with a category for men under-23 years old, with the professional category becoming an open (later elite) category.

Since 1995 until 2022, the event has been held towards the end of the European season in late September, usually following the Vuelta a España. Before that, the event had always been a summer race, held in late August or the first week of September (except for 1970, when it was a mid-season summer event). An exception to this was in 2023, when it was held in August as part of a combined multi-disciplinary UCI Cycling World Championships, intended to be held every four years. The next edition of the UCI Cycling World Championships will be held in the Haute-Savoie region of France in 2027.

The world championships are located in a different city or region every year. The event can be held over a relatively flat course which, in the case of the road race, favors cycling sprinters or a hilly course which favors a climbing specialist or all-rounder. In each case, the latter part of course is usually held on a circuit, of which the riders complete multiple laps.

The world championship road race and two of the three Grand Tours (namely the Giro d'Italia and the Tour de France) form the Triple Crown of Cycling.

== Editions ==
Note: Not held from 1939 to 1945 because of World War II.

Edition	Year	Location	Host country	Events
1	1921	Copenhagen	Denmark	1
2	1922	Liverpool	Great Britain	1
3	1923	Zürich	Switzerland	1
4	1924	Paris	France	1
5	1925	Apeldoorn	Netherlands	1
6	1926	Milan	Italy	1
7	1927	Nürburgring	Germany	2
8	1928	Budapest	Hungary	2
9	1929	Zürich	Switzerland	2
10	1930	Liège	Belgium	2
11	1931	Copenhagen	Denmark	2
12	1932	Rome	Italy	2
13	1933	Montlhéry	France	2
14	1934	Leipzig	Germany	2
15	1935	Floreffe	Belgium	2
16	1936	Bern	Switzerland	2
17	1937	Copenhagen	Denmark	2
18	1938	Valkenburg	Netherlands	2
19	1946	Zürich	Switzerland	2
20	1947	Reims	France	2
21	1948	Valkenburg	Netherlands	2
22	1949	Copenhagen	Denmark	2
23	1950	Moorslede	Belgium	2
24	1951	Varese	Italy	2
25	1952	Luxembourg	Luxembourg	2
26	1953	Lugano	Switzerland	2
27	1954	Solingen	West Germany	2
28	1955	Frascati	Italy	2
29	1956	Copenhagen	Denmark	2
30	1957	Waregem	Belgium	2
31	1958	Reims	France	3
32	1959	Zandvoort	Netherlands	3
33	1960	Karl-Marx-Stadt	East Germany	3
34	1961	Bern	Switzerland	3
35	1962	Salò di Garda	Italy	4
36	1963	Ronse	Belgium	4
37	1964	Sallanches	France	4
38	1965	San Sebastián	Spain	4
39	1966	Nürburgring	West Germany	4
40	1967	Heerlen	Netherlands	4
41	1968	Imola	Italy	4
42	1969	Zolder	Belgium	4
43	1970	Leicester	Great Britain	4
44	1971	Mendrisio	Switzerland	4
45	1972	Gap	France	2
46	1973	Barcelona	Spain	4
47	1974	Montreal	Canada	4
48	1975	Yvoir	Belgium	4
49	1976	Ostuni	Italy	2
50	1977	San Cristóbal	Venezuela	4
51	1978	Nürburgring	West Germany	4
52	1979	Valkenburg	Netherlands	4
53	1980	Sallanches	France	2
54	1981	Prague	Czechoslovakia	4
55	1982	Chichester	Great Britain	4

Edition	Year	Location	Host country	Events
56	1983	Altenrhein	Switzerland	4
57	1984	Barcelona	Spain	1
58	1985	Giavera del Montello	Italy	4
59	1986	Colorado Springs	United States	4
60	1987	Villach	Austria	5
61	1988	Ronse	Belgium	2
62	1989	Chambéry	France	5
63	1990	Utsunomiya	Japan	5
64	1991	Stuttgart	Germany	5
65	1992	Benidorm	Spain	2
66	1993	Oslo	Norway	5
67	1994	Agrigento	Italy	7
68	1995	Duitama	Colombia	5
69	1996	Lugano	Switzerland	6
70	1997	San Sebastián	Spain	10
71	1998	Valkenburg	Netherlands	10
72	1999	Verona	Italy	10
73	2000	Plouay	France	10
74	2001	Lisbon	Portugal	10
75	2002	Zolder	Belgium	10
76	2003	Hamilton	Canada	10
77	2004	Verona	Italy	10
78	2005	Madrid	Spain	6
79	2006	Salzburg	Austria	6
80	2007	Stuttgart	Germany	6
81	2008	Varese	Italy	6
82	2009	Mendrisio	Switzerland	6
83	2010	Geelong	Australia	6
84	2011	Copenhagen	Denmark	10
85	2012	Valkenburg	Netherlands	12
86	2013	Florence	Italy	12
87	2014	Ponferrada	Spain	12
88	2015	Richmond	United States	12
89	2016	Doha	Qatar	12
90	2017	Bergen	Norway	12
91	2018	Innsbruck	Austria	12
92	2019	Harrogate	Great Britain	11
93	2020	Imola (Note: Originally planned to be held in the Aigle and Martigny area in Switzerland, however this was cancelled due to the COVID-19 pandemic)	Italy	4
94	2021	Flanders	Belgium	11
95	2022	Wollongong	Australia	11 (Note: 13 titles were given out in the course of the 11 events, as women in the U23 age category participated in the elite events)
96	2023	Glasgow (Note: Held in conjunction with the 2023 UCI Cycling World Championships)	Great Britain	11
97	2024	Zurich (Note: Held alongside the 2024 UCI Para-cycling Road World Championships)	Switzerland	11
98	2025	Kigali	Rwanda	13
99	2026	Montreal	Canada	13
100	2027	Haute-Savoie (Note: To be held in conjunction with the 2027 UCI Cycling World Championships)	France	13
101	2028	Abu Dhabi	United Arab Emirates	13
102	2029	Aarhus/Copenhagen	Denmark	13
103	2030	Brussels	Belgium	13
104	2031	Trentino (Note: To be held in conjunction with the 2031 UCI Cycling World Championships)	Italy	13
105	2032	Pune	India	13
106	2033	Not yet announced		13
107	2034	Groningen/Drenthe	Netherlands	13

== Hosts ==
Updated after 2026 UCI Road World Championships.

Times	Nations
14	Italy
11	Switzerland
10	Belgium
9	France
8	Germany - Netherlands
7	Spain
6	Denmark
5	Great Britain
3	Austria - Canada
2	Australia - Norway - United States
1	Colombia - Czechoslovakia - Hungary - Japan - Luxembourg - Portugal - Qatar - Rwanda - Venezuela

== All medals ==
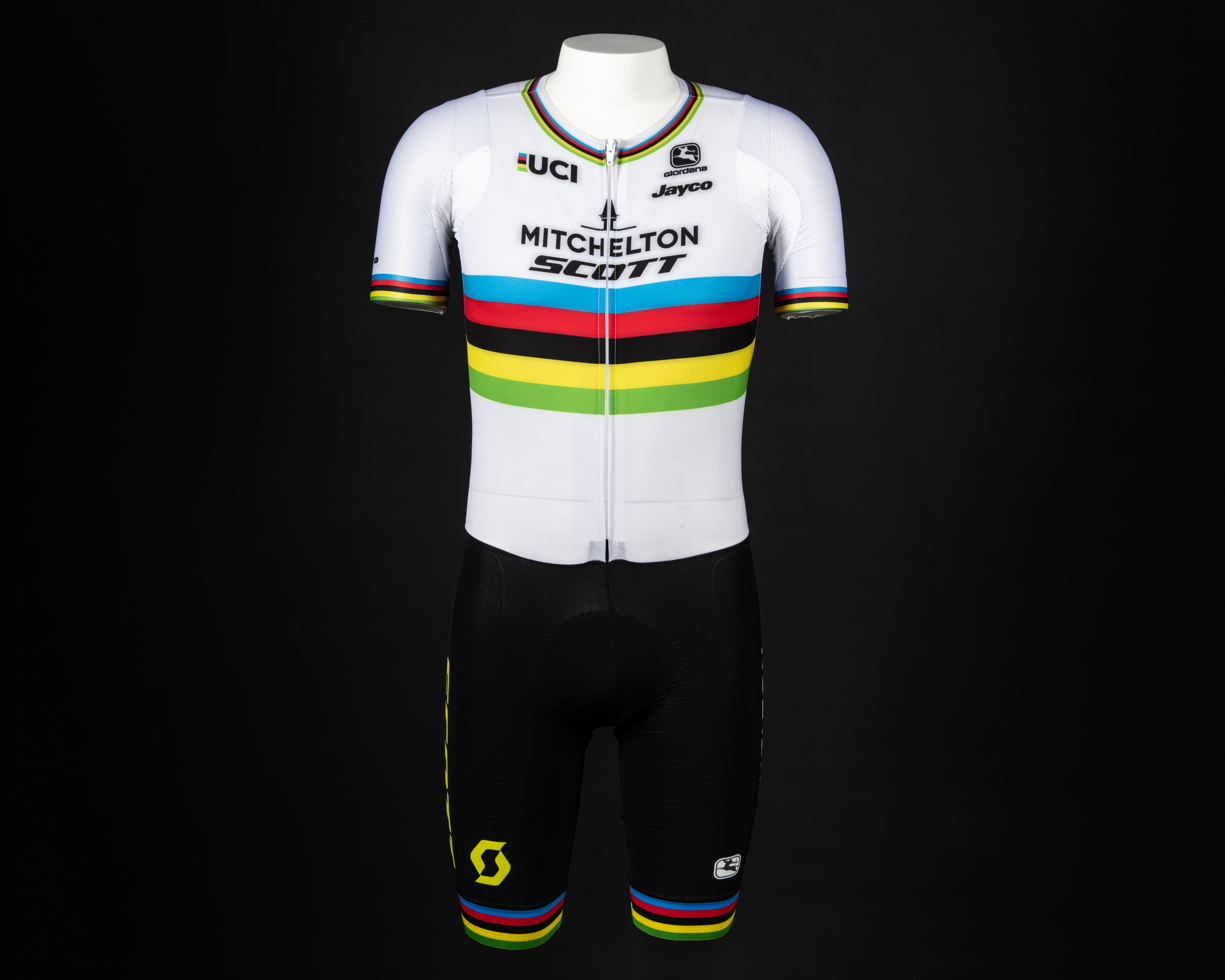
Rainbow jersey of Annemiek van Vleuten, winner of the women's road race at the 2020 UCI Road World Championships (collection of KOERS. Museum of Cycle Racing)

Updated after the 2026 UCI Road World Championships.

The medal table includes only medals won in senior events. Mixed-nationality team events, including the Team Time Trial held from 2012 to 2018, are excluded.

Rank	Nation	Gold	Silver	Bronze	Total
1	Italy	56	53	46	155
2	Belgium	43	36	35	114
3	Netherlands	43	36	31	110
4	France	35	36	32	103
5	Switzerland	19	25	25	69
6	United States	17	15	13	45
7	Great Britain	15	12	14	41
8	Germany	14	17	22	53
9	Spain	13	15	19	47
10	Soviet Union	12	16	16	44
11	Sweden	10	5	8	23
12	East Germany	10	2	4	16
13	Australia	8	16	8	32
14	Poland	8	8	5	21
15	Denmark	7	11	12	30
16	West Germany	4	4	5	13
17	Russia	4	4	4	12
18	Slovakia	4	3	0	7
19	Lithuania	3	3	5	11
20	Norway	3	2	6	11
21	Colombia	2	1	2	5
21	Slovenia	2	1	2	5
23	Belarus	2	0	1	3
24	Canada	1	4	3	8
25	New Zealand	1	4	2	7
26	Luxembourg	1	3	4	8
27	Ukraine	1	2	1	4
28	Ireland	1	1	4	6
29	Latvia	1	1	0	2
30	Portugal	1	0	0	1
31	Czechoslovakia	0	2	2	4
32	Austria	0	1	4	5
33	Hungary	0	1	1	2
34	Brazil	0	1	0	1
35	Kazakhstan	0	0	2	2
36	Czech Republic	0	0	1	1
36	Finland	0	0	1	1
36	Uruguay	0	0	1	1
Totals (38 entries)		341	341	341	1,023

== Countries ==
- Belgium at the UCI Road World Championships
- Denmark at the UCI Road World Championships
- Germany at the UCI Road World Championships
- Italy at the UCI Road World Championships
- Lithuania at the UCI Road World Championships
- Netherlands at the UCI Road World Championships
- New Zealand at the UCI Road World Championships
- Spain at the UCI Road World Championships
- United States at the UCI Road World Championships

== See also ==
- UCI World Championships
- European Road Championships
- Triple Crown of Cycling

== Sources ==
- "2020 UCI Road World Championships - Technical Guide" (PDF). UCI.org. Union Cycliste Internationale. 21 September 2020.
