= 1961 UCI Road World Championships =

- Location within Switzerland
- Venue: Bern, Switzerland
- Dates: 2 and 3 September 1961
- Coordinates: 46°56′53″N 7°26′51″E

The 1961 UCI Road World Championships was the 34th edition of the UCI Road World Championships.

It took place on 2 and 3 September 1961 in Bern, Switzerland. It was the second time the championships were organized in Bern, after the 1936 UCI Road World Championships.

The women's race took place on 10 August on the Isle of Man. Belgian Yvonne Reynders won her second of four world titles on the road.

The amateurs rode 181.5 kilometers on Saturday, September 2, 1961. It was a triumph for the French amateurs, who won gold, silver and bronze. The three Frenchmen escaped together on a climb after about 145 kilometers. In the final lap, Jean Jourden defeated his two compatriots.

The professional cyclists rode on Sunday, September 3, 1961, over a distance of 285.252 kilometers. Belgian Rik Van Looy extended his world title; he narrowly defeated the Italian Nino Defilippis in a sprint. Frenchman Raymond Poulidor came third.

In the same period, the 1961 UCI Track Cycling World Championships were organized in the Oerlikon Velodrome in Zürich, Switzerland.

== Results ==
| Race: | Gold: | Time | Silver: | Time | Bronze: | Time |
Men
| Men's road race | Rik Van Looy; Belgium | 7 h 46 min 35s | Nino Defilippis; Italy | m.t. | Raymond Poulidor; France | m.t. |
| Amateurs' road race | Jean Jourden; France | - | Henri Belena; France | - | Jacques Gestraut; France | - |
Women
| Women's road race | Yvonne Reynders; Belgium | - | Beryl Burton; Great Britain | - | Elsy Jacobs; Luxembourg | - |

== Medal table ==
| Rank | Nation | Gold | Silver | Bronze | Total |
|---|---|---|---|---|---|
| 1 | Belgium (BEL) | 2 | 0 | 0 | 2 |
| 2 | France (FRA) | 1 | 1 | 2 | 4 |
| 3 | Great Britain (GBR) | 0 | 1 | 0 | 1 |
| 3 | Italy (ITA) | 0 | 1 | 0 | 1 |
| 5 | Luxembourg (LUX) | 0 | 0 | 1 | 1 |
| Totals (5 entries) | | 3 | 3 | 3 | 9 |
