= 2018 UCI Road World Championships – Men's road race =

Men's road race
2018 UCI Road World Championships
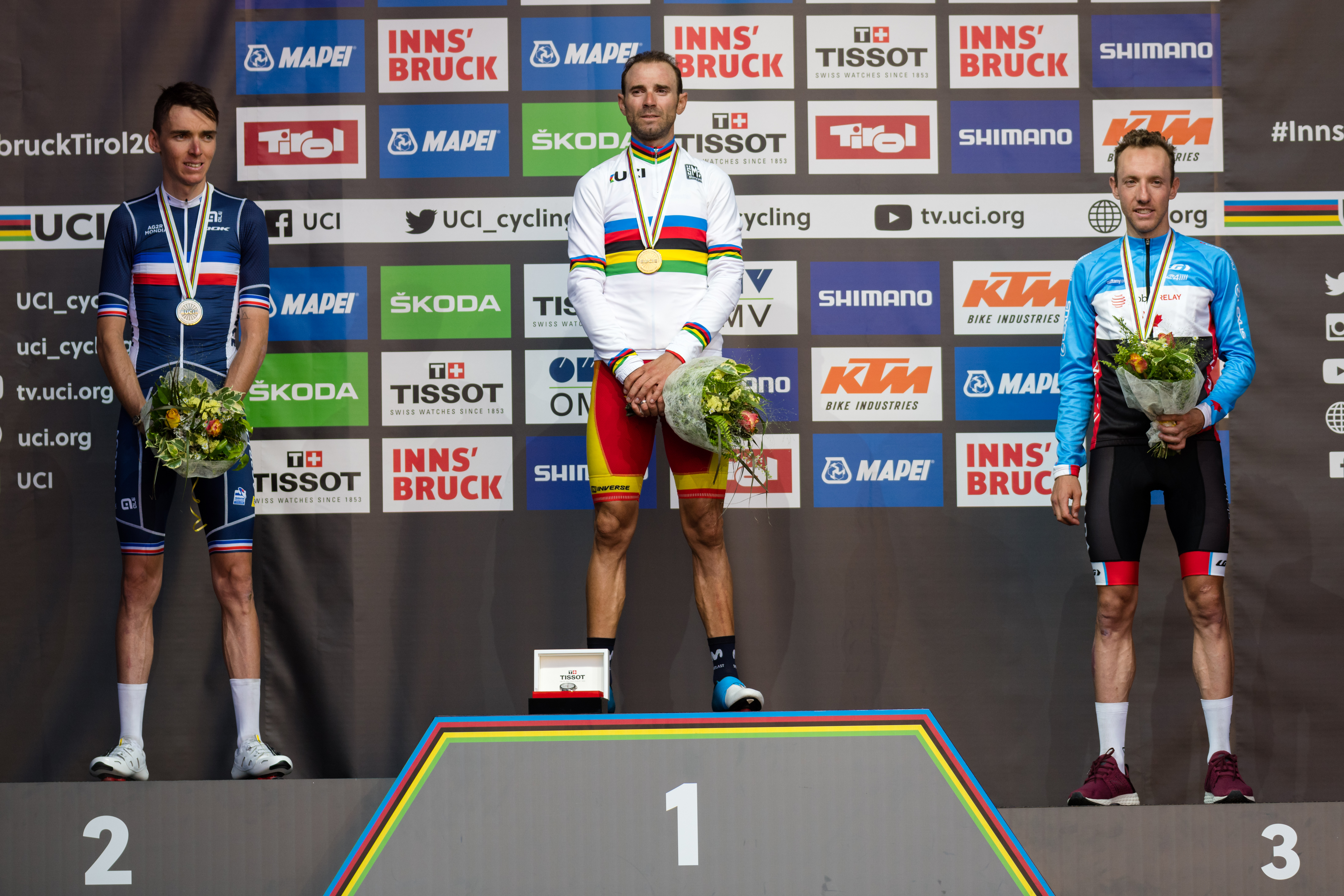
- The final podium (from left to right): Romain Bardet (France), Alejandro Valverde (Spain) and Michael Woods (Canada).

Race details
- Dates: 30 September 2018
- Stages: 1
- Distance: 258 km (160.3 mi)
- Winning time: 6h 46' 41"

Medalists
	Gold	(Spain) Alejandro Valverde (ESP)
	Silver	(France) Romain Bardet (FRA)
	Bronze	(Canada) Michael Woods (CAN)

The Men's road race of the 2018 UCI Road World Championships was a cycling event that took place on 30 September 2018 in Innsbruck, Austria. It was the 85th edition of the championship, and Slovakia's Peter Sagan was the three times defending champion, a record in the event. 188 riders from 44 nations entered the competition.

After previously winning six medals in the race without taking the gold medal, Spain's Alejandro Valverde took his first world title after a four-rider sprint finish decided the medals. Valverde went clear with a small group of riders on the steep Höttinger Höll climb, making headway on the descent with France's Romain Bardet and Canadian rider Michael Woods. Tom Dumoulin (Netherlands) joined the trio on the run-in to the finish, but his efforts to do so resulted in him missing out on the medals, behind Bardet (silver) and Woods (bronze).

Valverde's victory was the first for Spain in the event since Óscar Freire won the title in Verona, Italy in 2004. France and Canada also ended long streaks without a medal in the event as Bardet's silver was the first medal for France since Anthony Geslin won the bronze medal in Madrid, Spain in 2005, while Woods won only the second medal for a Canadian male rider in the road race, after Steve Bauer's bronze medal at the 1984 race, also in Spain in Barcelona.

== Course ==
The race started in Kufstein and headed south-west towards Innsbruck with a primarily rolling route, except for a climb of 5 kilometres (3.1 miles) between Fritzens and Gnadenwald – as had been in the time trial events earlier in the week – with an average 7.1% gradient and maximum of 14% in places. After 84.2 kilometres (52.3 miles), the riders crossed the finish line for the first time, before starting six laps of a circuit 23.8 kilometres (14.8 miles) in length. The circuit contained a climb of 7.9 kilometres (4.9 miles), at an average gradient of 5.9% but reaching 10% in places, from the outskirts of Innsbruck through Aldrans and Lans towards Igls. After a short period of flat roads, the race descended through Igls back towards Innsbruck.

On the seventh and final lap, the race continued onto a further loop of just over 7 kilometres (4.3 miles) at Hötting, with the 2.8-kilometre (1.7 mi)-long Höttinger Höll climb towards Gramartboden starting almost immediately. The climb featured an average gradient of 11.5%, with a portion of the climb reaching 28% around two-thirds up. Upon reaching the top, the race descended through Hungerburg back towards rejoining the original circuit with around 3.5 kilometres (2.2 miles) to go and heading towards the finish line in front of the Tyrolean State Theatre. In total, the race featured 4,681 metres (15,358 feet) of climbing.

== Qualification ==
Qualification was based mainly on the UCI World Ranking by nations as of 12 August 2018. The first ten nations in this classification qualified eight riders to start, the next ten nations qualified six riders to start, with the nations ranked 21st to 30th qualifying five riders to start. One rider from each of the next twenty nations was also qualified to start. In addition to this number, any rider within the top 200 of the UCI World Ranking by individuals that was not already qualified, the outgoing World Champion and the current continental champions were also able to take part.

=== UCI World Rankings ===
The following nations qualified.

Criterium	Rank	Number of riders		Nations
Criterium	Rank	To enter	To start	Nations
UCI World Ranking by Nations	1–10	13	8	Italy; Belgium; France; Great Britain; Netherlands; Spain; Colombia; Australia; Denmark; Slovenia
UCI World Ranking by Nations	11–20	9	6	Germany; Norway; Slovakia; Poland; Switzerland; Ireland; Czech Republic; Russia; Austria; Luxembourg
UCI World Ranking by Nations	21–30	7	4	Portugal; United States; South Africa; New Zealand; Canada; Kazakhstan; Ecuador; Latvia; Belarus; Estonia
UCI World Ranking by Nations	31–50	2	1	Ukraine; Eritrea; Japan; Argentina; Algeria; Rwanda; Iran; Romania; Croatia; Costa Rica; Turkey; Hong Kong; Venezuela; Lithuania; Sweden; Morocco; Azerbaijan; Greece; South Korea; Brazil
UCI World Ranking by Individuals (if not already qualified)	1–200	2	1	—

=== Continental champions ===
Name	Country	Reason
Peter Sagan	Slovakia	Outgoing World Champion
Amanuel Gebrezgabihier	Eritrea	African Champion
Yousif Mirza	United Arab Emirates	Asian Champion

=== Participating nations ===
188 cyclists from 44 nations were entered in the men's road race. The number of cyclists per nation is shown in parentheses.

- Argentina (1)
- Australia (8)
- Austria (6)
- Belarus (4)
- Belgium (8)
- Brazil (1)
- Canada (4)
- Colombia (8)
- Costa Rica (1)
- Croatia (1)
- Czech Republic (6)
- Denmark (8)
- Ecuador (2)
- Eritrea (2)
- Estonia (3)
- Ethiopia (1)
- France (8)
- Germany (6)
- Great Britain (8)
- Greece (1)
- Hong Kong (1)
- Iran (1)
- Ireland (4)
- Italy (8)
- Japan (1)
- Kazakhstan (4)
- Latvia (2)
- Lithuania (1)
- Luxembourg (6)
- Netherlands (8)
- New Zealand (4)
- Norway (6)
- Poland (6)
- Portugal (4)
- Romania (1)
- Russia (6)
- Slovakia (7)
- Slovenia (8)
- South Africa (2)
- Spain (8)
- Sweden (1)
- Switzerland (6)
- Ukraine (2)
- United States (4)

== Results ==
=== Final classification ===
Of the race's 188 entrants, 76 riders completed the full distance of 258 kilometres (160 miles).

Rank	Rider	Country	Time
1	Alejandro Valverde	Spain	6h 46' 41"
2	Romain Bardet	France	+ 0"
3	Michael Woods	Canada	+ 0"
4	Tom Dumoulin	Netherlands	+ 0"
5	Gianni Moscon	Italy	+ 13"
6	Roman Kreuziger	Czech Republic	+ 43"
7	Michael Valgren	Denmark	+ 43"
8	Julian Alaphilippe	France	+ 43"
9	Thibaut Pinot	France	+ 43"
10	Rui Costa	Portugal	+ 43"
11	Ion Izagirre	Spain	+ 43"
12	Bauke Mollema	Netherlands	+ 49"
13	Mikel Nieve	Spain	+ 52"
14	Sam Oomen	Netherlands	+ 1' 21"
15	Nairo Quintana	Colombia	+ 1' 21"
16	Peter Kennaugh	Great Britain	+ 1' 21"
17	Jan Hirt	Czech Republic	+ 1' 21"
18	George Bennett	New Zealand	+ 1' 21"
19	Jack Haig	Australia	+ 1' 21"
20	Jakob Fuglsang	Denmark	+ 1' 21"
21	Domenico Pozzovivo	Italy	+ 1' 21"
22	Andrey Zeits	Kazakhstan	+ 1' 21"
23	Ben Hermans	Belgium	+ 1' 32"
24	Simon Geschke	Germany	+ 1' 54"
25	Sergey Chernetskiy	Russia	+ 2' 00"
26	Mathias Frank	Switzerland	+ 2' 10"
27	Steven Kruijswijk	Netherlands	+ 2' 10"
28	Antwan Tolhoek	Netherlands	+ 2' 10"
29	Dylan Teuns	Belgium	+ 2' 10"
30	Odd Christian Eiking	Norway	+ 2' 42"
31	Rudy Molard	France	+ 2' 42"
32	Sébastien Reichenbach	Switzerland	+ 2' 42"
33	Rigoberto Urán	Colombia	+ 2' 57"
34	Primož Roglič	Slovenia	+ 4' 00"
35	Rafał Majka	Poland	+ 4' 00"
36	Alexey Lutsenko	Kazakhstan	+ 4' 00"
37	Adam Yates	Great Britain	+ 4' 00"
38	Wilco Kelderman	Netherlands	+ 4' 00"
39	Nelson Oliveira	Portugal	+ 5' 00"
40	Alessandro De Marchi	Italy	+ 5' 05"
41	Merhawi Kudus	Eritrea	+ 5' 44"
42	Xandro Meurisse	Belgium	+ 5' 44"
43	Vegard Stake Laengen	Norway	+ 5' 44"
44	David de la Cruz	Spain	+ 5' 56"
45	Michael Gogl	Austria	+ 5' 56"
46	Emanuel Buchmann	Germany	+ 5' 56"
47	Pavel Sivakov	Russia	+ 6' 00"
48	Sergio Henao	Colombia	+ 6' 02"
49	Vincenzo Nibali	Italy	+ 6' 02"
50	Greg Van Avermaet	Belgium	+ 8' 08"
51	Pavel Kochetkov	Russia	+ 8' 08"
52	Kasper Asgreen	Denmark	+ 10' 22"
53	Franco Pellizotti	Italy	+ 10' 33"
54	Carl Fredrik Hagen	Norway	+ 12' 24"
55	Emil Vinjebo	Denmark	+ 12' 57"
56	Łukasz Owsian	Poland	+ 13' 05"
57	Ilnur Zakarin	Russia	+ 13' 05"
58	Tony Gallopin	France	+ 13' 05"
59	Patrick Konrad	Austria	+ 13' 05"
60	Steve Morabito	Switzerland	+ 13' 05"
61	Jesús Herrada	Spain	+ 13' 09"
62	Toms Skujiņš	Latvia	+ 13' 13"
63	Brent Bookwalter	United States	+ 14' 23"
64	Damiano Caruso	Italy	+ 14' 23"
65	Dario Cataldo	Italy	+ 14' 23"
66	Hugh Carthy	Great Britain	+ 14' 23"
67	Nicolas Roche	Ireland	+ 14' 23"
68	Tim Wellens	Belgium	+ 14' 23"
69	Pieter Weening	Netherlands	+ 14' 23"
70	Rob Power	Australia	+ 14' 23"
71	Richard Carapaz	Ecuador	+ 14' 48"
72	Ben King	United States	+ 15' 57"
73	Eduardo Sepúlveda	Argentina	+ 16' 51"
74	Nico Denz	Germany	+ 18' 17"
75	Gianluca Brambilla	Italy	+ 19' 35"
76	Rob Britton	Canada	+ 19' 37"

=== Failed to finish ===
112 riders failed to finish.

Rider	Country
Enric Mas	Spain
Simon Clarke	Australia
Omar Fraile	Spain
Jonathan Castroviejo	Spain
Jacques Janse van Rensburg	South Africa
Tanel Kangert	Estonia
Michał Kwiatkowski	Poland
Wout Poels	Netherlands
Jesper Hansen	Denmark
Markus Hoelgaard	Norway
Peter Stetina	United States
Kilian Frankiny	Switzerland
Andriy Hrivko	Ukraine
Ildar Arslanov	Russia
Marcus Burghardt	Germany
Dan Martin	Ireland
Bob Jungels	Luxembourg
Ilia Koshevoy	Belarus
Tobias Ludvigsson	Sweden
Karel Hník	Czech Republic
Tao Geoghegan Hart	Great Britain
Damien Howson	Australia
Nick Schultz	Australia
Matej Mohorič	Slovenia
Simon Yates	Great Britain
Simon Špilak	Slovenia
Jan Polanc	Slovenia
Zdeněk Štybar	Czech Republic
Felix Großschartner	Austria
Sepp Kuss	United States
Patrick Schelling	Switzerland
Maximilian Schachmann	Germany
Amanuel Gebrezgabihier	Eritrea
Alexandr Riabushenko	Belarus
Daniil Fominykh	Kazakhstan
Michael Schär	Switzerland
Miguel Ángel López	Colombia
Ruben Guerreiro	Portugal

Rider	Country
Paul Martens	Germany
Michał Gołaś	Poland
Chris Hamilton	Australia
Edvald Boasson Hagen	Norway
Winner Anacona	Colombia
Conor Dunne	Ireland
Hideto Nakane	Japan
Ryan Mullen	Ireland
Laurens De Plus	Belgium
Jhonatan Narváez	Ecuador
Tsgabu Grmay	Ethiopia
Gregor Mühlberger	Austria
James Knox	Great Britain
Connor Swift	Great Britain
Tiago Machado	Portugal
Antoine Duchesne	Canada
Josef Černý	Czech Republic
Anthony Roux	France
Alexandre Geniez	France
Ben Gastauer	Luxembourg
Rory Sutherland	Australia
Mads Würtz Schmidt	Denmark
Laurent Didier	Luxembourg
Grega Bole	Slovenia
Jan Tratnik	Slovenia
Lukas Pöstlberger	Austria
Georg Preidler	Austria
Maciej Bodnar	Poland
Maciej Paterski	Poland
Patrick Bevin	New Zealand
Peter Sagan	Slovakia
Nikita Stalnov	Kazakhstan
Rohan Dennis	Australia
Serge Pauwels	Belgium
Dion Smith	New Zealand
Sebastián Henao	Colombia
Daniel Martínez	Colombia

Rider	Country
Tiesj Benoot	Belgium
Josip Rumac	Croatia
Matti Breschel	Denmark
Nicholas Dlamini	South Africa
Dmitry Strakhov	Russia
Rodrigo Contreras	Colombia
Sven Erik Bystrøm	Norway
Martin Haring	Slovakia
Tom Wirtgen	Luxembourg
Juraj Sagan	Slovakia
Patrik Tybor	Slovakia
Michael Kukrle	Czech Republic
Marek Čanecký	Slovakia
Krists Neilands	Latvia
Ian Stannard	Great Britain
Jempy Drucker	Luxembourg
Román Villalobos	Costa Rica
Andrii Bratashchuk	Ukraine
Warren Barguil	France
Domen Novak	Slovenia
Hugo Houle	Canada
Vasil Kiryienka	Belarus
Luka Pibernik	Slovenia
Rein Taaramäe	Estonia
Ignatas Konovalovas	Lithuania
Yauhen Sobal	Belarus
Niklas Eg	Denmark
Erik Baška	Slovakia
Martin Mahďar	Slovakia
Esmail Chaichi	Iran
Sam Bewley	New Zealand
Serghei Țvetcov	Romania
Alex Kirsch	Luxembourg
Stylianos Farantakis	Greece
Norman Vahtra	Estonia
Ho San Chiu	Hong Kong
Nícolas Sessler	Brazil
