= Sjefke Janssen =

Dutch cyclist

Sjef Janssen
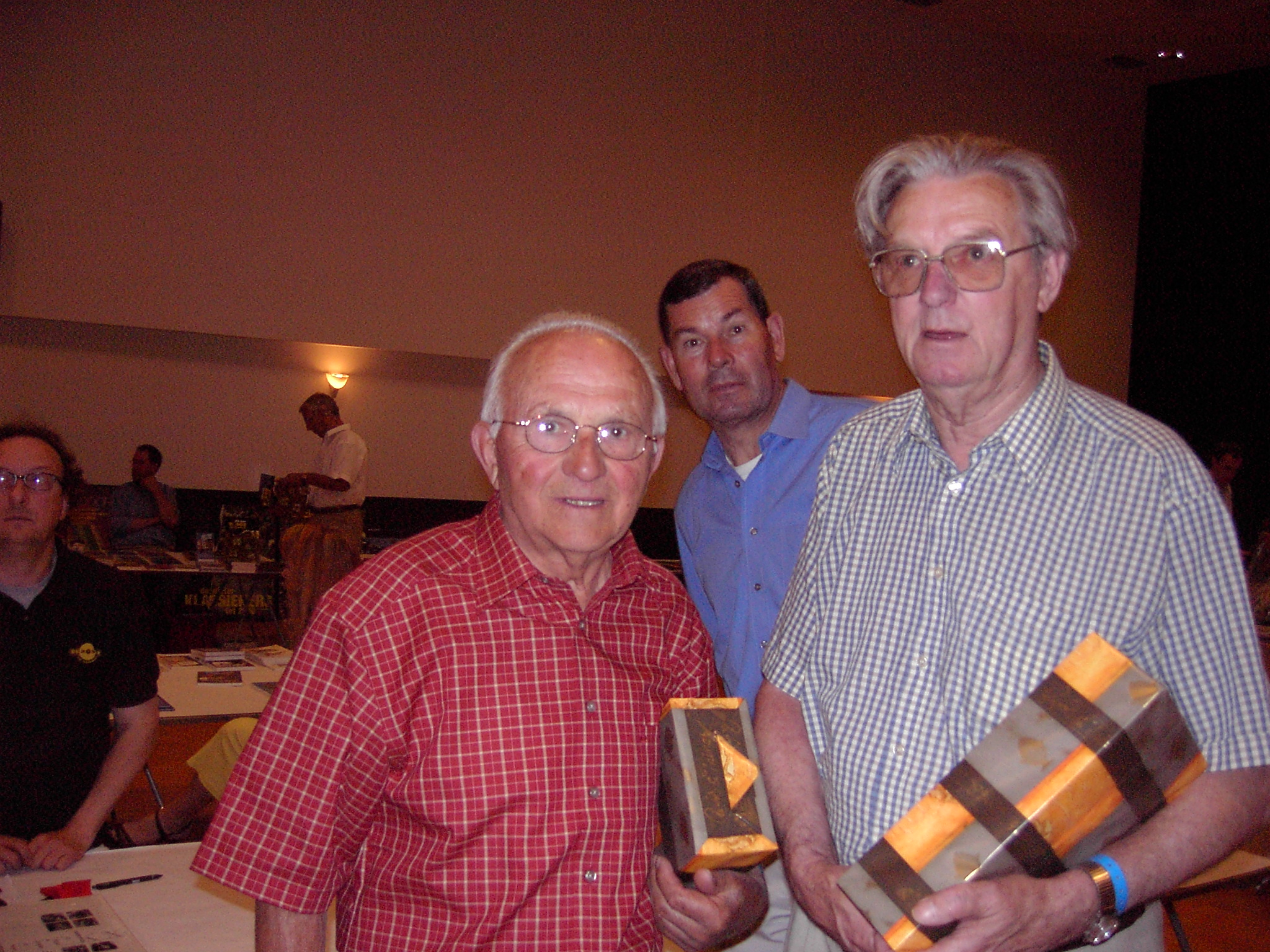
- Sjefke Janssen (left) together with Jan Nolten (right)

Personal information
- Full name: Sjefke Janssen
- Born: 28 October 1919 Elsloo, the Netherlands
- Died: 3 December 2014 (aged 95)

Cycling career
- Sport: Cycling
- Role: Rider
Medal record
Representing Netherlands
Men's road bicycle racing
World Championships
Bronze medal – third place	1947 Reims	Elite Men's Road Race

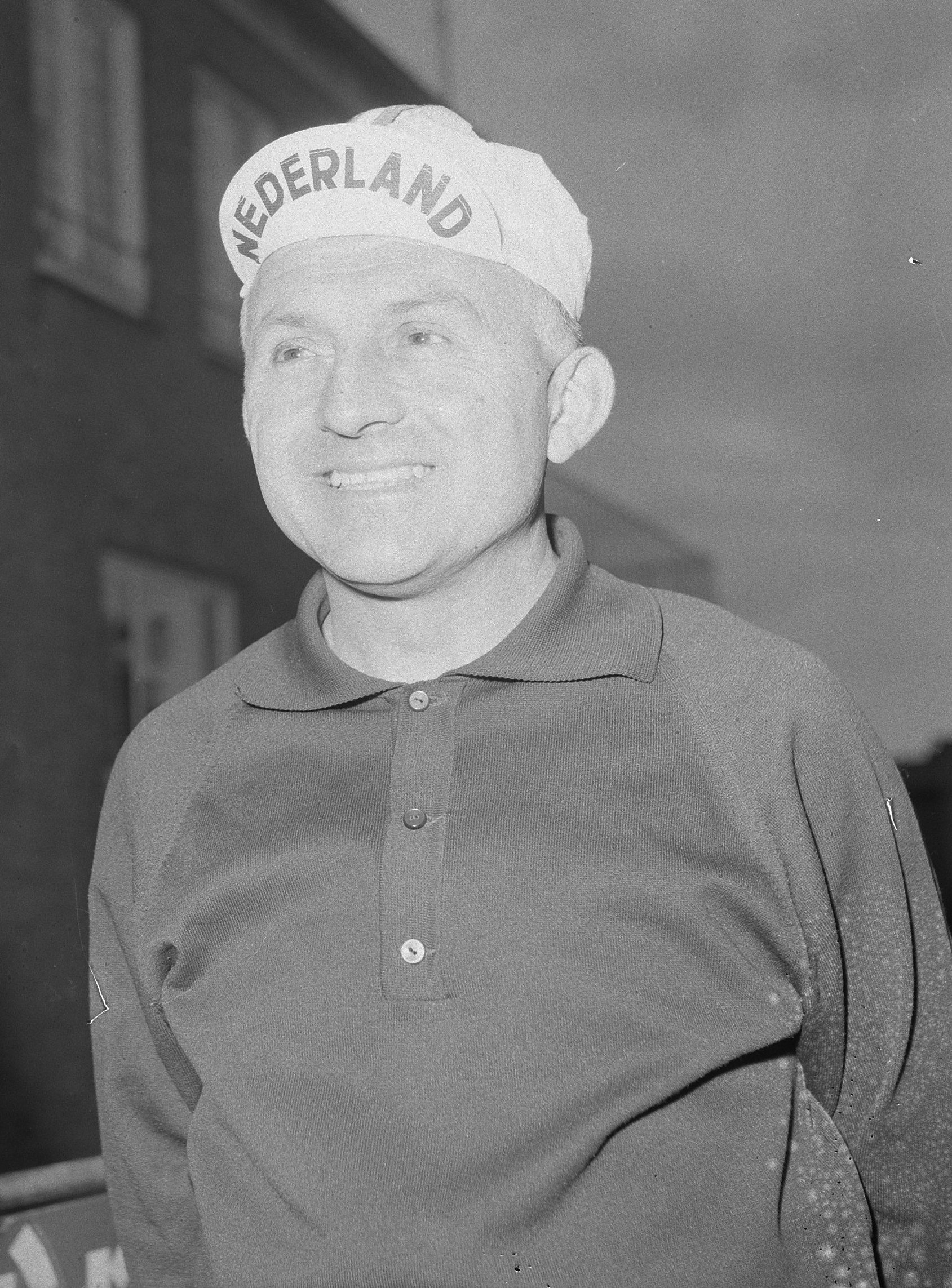
Sjefke Janssen (1965)

Sjefke Janssen (28 October 1919 – 3 December 2014) was a Dutch professional road bicycle racer. He is most known for his bronze medal in the Elite race of the 1947 UCI Road World Championships. Janssen was a professional cyclist from 1946 through 1954. After retiring, he became a cycling team-manager and owned a bicycle shop in Elsloo.

== Personal life ==
Janssen was born and died in Elsloo. At the time of his death, Janssen was the oldest living Dutch Tour de France racer. He was the father of Dutch Olympic team dressage coach Sjef Janssen.

== Major results ==
1944
Netherlands Independent Road Race Champion
1946 - Bloc Centauro
1947 - Magneet
(Netherlands) Dutch National Road Race Championship
(bronze) World Road Race Championship
32nd, Tour de France
1948 - Magneet, Garin-Wolber
6th Tour de Romandie
36th, Tour de France
1949 - Magneet
(Netherlands) Dutch National Road Race Championship
5th, Tour de Luxembourg
1950 - RIH, Terrot, Magneet
1st, Stage 2, Saarland Rundfahrt
3rd, National Road Race Championship
1951 - Ceylon, Prisma
1952 - Express, Venz
1953 - Locomotief
8th, Züri-Metzgete
1954 - Locomotief
