= 1925 UCI Road World Championships =

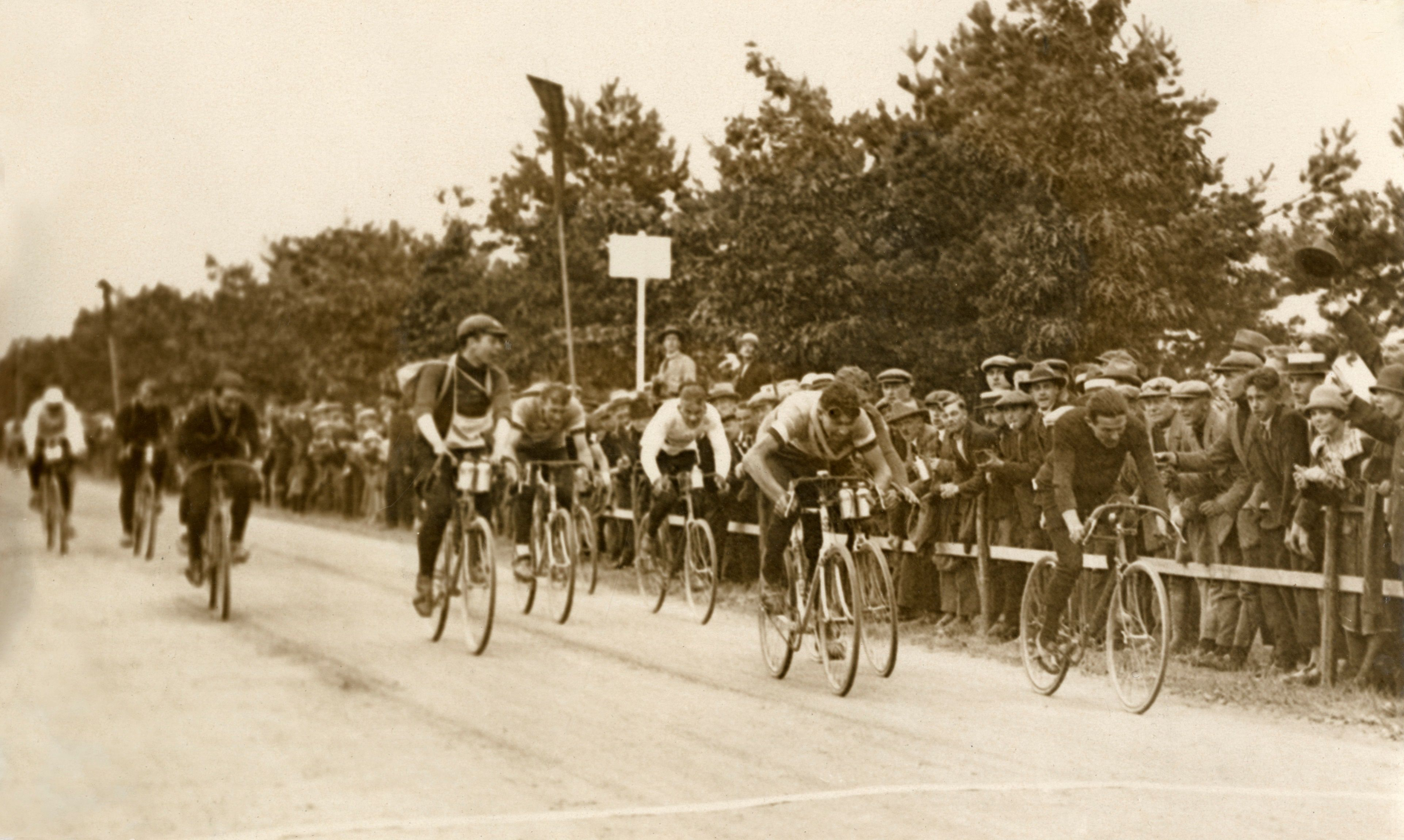

- Venue: Apeldoorn, the Netherlands
- Date: 22 August 1925
- Coordinates: 52°13′N 5°58′E
- Nations participating: 11
- Events: 1

The 1925 UCI Road World Championships was the fifth edition of the UCI Road World Championships. The championship took place in Apeldoorn, the Netherlands on Saturday 22 August 1925 and consisted of 1 race for amateur cyclists.

In the same period, the 1925 UCI Track Cycling World Championships was organized in the Olympic Stadium of Amsterdam.

== Events summary ==
Event	Gold		Silver		Bronze	
Men's events
Men's amateur road race	Henri Hoevenaers; Belgium	5 u. 34 min. 09 sec.	Marc Bocher; France	-	Georges Van den Berghe; Netherlands	-

== Medal table ==
Rank	Nation	Gold	Silver	Bronze	Total
1	Belgium (BEL)	1	0	0	1
2	France (FRA)	0	1	0	1
3	Netherlands (NLD)	0	0	1	1
Totals (3 entries)		1	1	1	3

== Results ==
The course was 183 km from Apeldoorn to Apeldoorn. There were 36 participants.

Place	Rider	Country	Time
1	Henri Hoevenaers	Belgium	5 h. 34 min. 09 sec.
2	Marc Bocher	France	s.t.
3	Gert van den Berg	Netherlands	s.t.
4	Joop van der Aar	Netherlands	s.t.
5	Henry-Peter Hansen	Denmark	s.t.
6	Julien Verbist	Belgium	s.t.
7	André Leducq	France	s.t.
8	Anton Reitberger	Austria	s.t.
9	Albert Blattman	Switzerland	s.t.
10	Otto Lehner	Switzerland	s.t.
11	Alfred Schmidt	Germany	s.t.
12	Giovanni Balla	Italy	s.t.
13	Nol Muller	Netherlands	s.t.
14	Pietro Cevini	Italy	s.t.
15	Albert Maansson	Denmark	s.t.
16	Frank Southall	United Kingdom	s.t.
17	Ernst Suter	Switzerland	s.t.
18	Jan Maas	Netherlands	s.t.
19	Sante Ferrato	Italy	s.t.
20	Karel Van Hassel	Belgium	s.t.
21	Andy Wilson	USA	s.t.
22	Jean-François De Buyst	Belgium	s.t.
23	Richard Zeissner	Germany	s.t.
24	Antonio Negrini	Italy	s.t.
25	Hans Kinzen	Germany	s.t.
26	Adolf Haug	Austria	s.t.
27	Bill Temme	United Kingdom	s.t.
28	Frederick-Henry Wyld	United Kingdom	s.t.
29	Armand Blanchonnet	France	s.t.
DNF	Mohamed Madhour	Egypt	—N/a

== See also ==
- 1925 UCI Track Cycling World Championships
