= Moorslede =

- Municipality
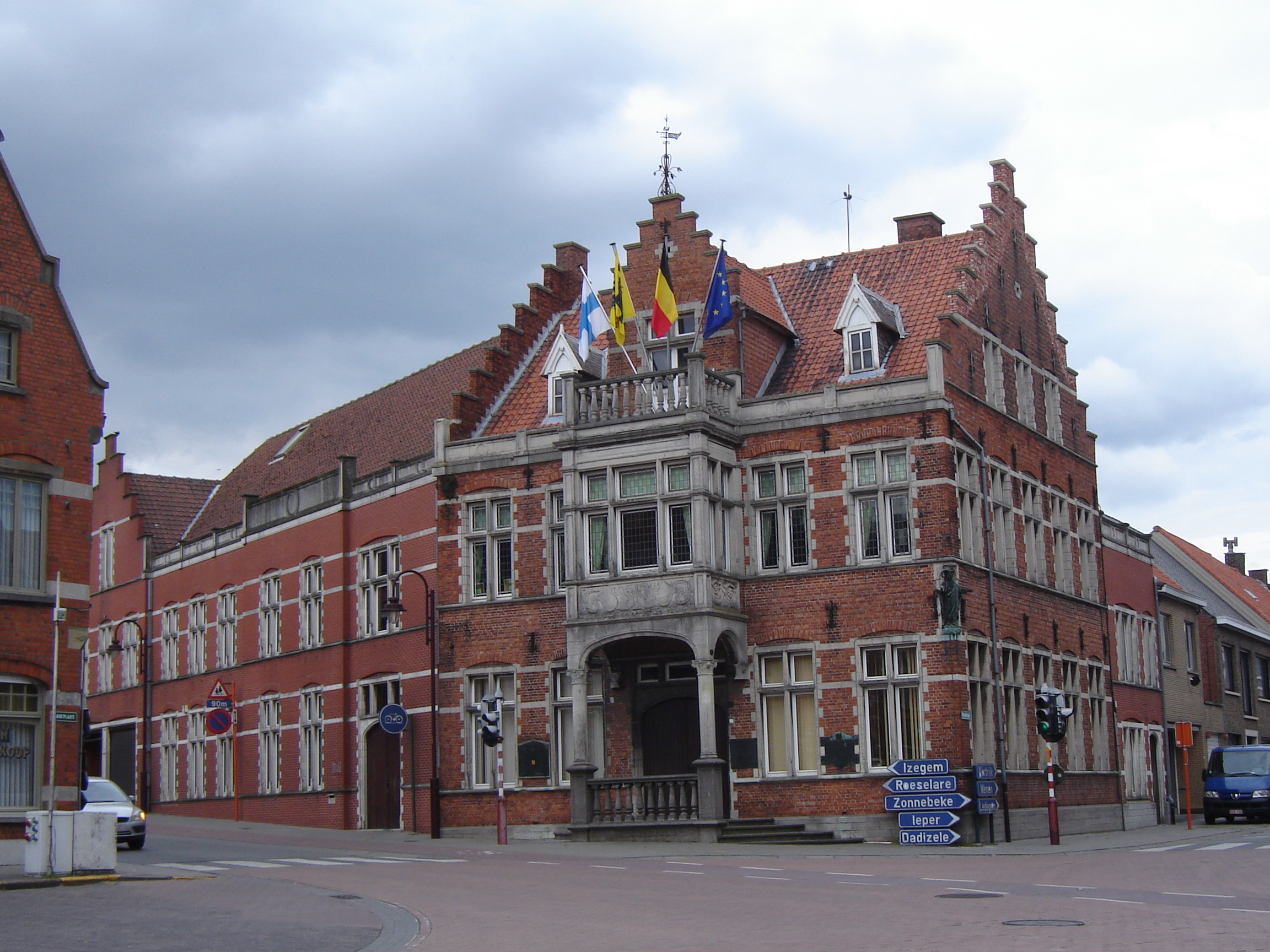
- Moorslede town hall

- Flag Coat of arms

- Location of Moorslede in West Flanders
- Interactive map of Moorslede
- Location in Belgium
- Coordinates: 50°53′N 03°04′E
- Country: Belgium
- Community: Flemish Community
- Region: Flemish Region
- Province: West Flanders
- Arrondissement: Roeselare

Government
  - Mayor: Ward Vergote (Visie)
  - Governing parties: Visie, STERK

Area
  - Total: 35.45 km^{2} (13.69 sq mi)

Population (2018-01-01)
  - Total: 11,080
  - Density: 312.6/km^{2} (809.5/sq mi)
- Postal codes: 8890
- NIS code: 36012
- Area codes: 051
- Website: www.moorslede.be

Moorslede (Dutch pronunciation: [ˈmoːrsˌleːdə]) is a municipality located in the Belgian province of West Flanders. The municipality comprises the towns of Dadizele, Slypskapelle and Moorslede proper. On 1 January 2006, Moorslede had a total population of 10,618. The total area is 35.34 km^{2} which gives a population density of 300 inhabitants per km^{2}.

== History ==
Moorslede was host of the 1950 UCI Road World Championships, won by Briek Schotte.

== Notable inhabitants ==
- Constant Lievens (1856-1893), the apostle of the Chota Nagpur, was born in Moorslede.
- Emiel Jacques nl:Emiel Jacques (Moorslede 1874 - Michigan, 1937) was a Flemish painter, illustrator and professor, best known for his flax paintings.
- Camille Cools (1874, Moorslede - 1916, Detroit, USA) was the founder, editor and publisher of the Gazette van Detroit.
- Maxime Lestienne (1992 —), former professional footballer for Club Brugge, Standard Liege, Lion City Sailors.
