= 1947 UCI Road World Championships =

- Venue: Reims, France
- Date: 3 August 1947
- Coordinates: 49°15′46″N 4°02′05″E
- Events: 2

The 1947 UCI Road World Championships was the twentieth edition of the UCI Road World Championships. It took place on 3 August 1947 in Reims, France.

The championships were held on a 7.8-kilometre circuit for the amateurs and professionals.

In the same period, the 1947 UCI Track Cycling World Championships were organized in the Parc des Princes in Paris, France.

== Events summary ==
Event	Gold		Silver		Bronze	
Men's Events
Professional Road Race	Theo Middelkamp; Netherlands	7h 28' 17"	Albert Sercu; Belgium	+ 10"	Sjefke Janssen; Netherlands	s.t.
Amateur Road Race	Adolfo Ferrari; Italy	-	Silvio Pedroni; Italy	-	Gerard van Beek; Netherlands	-
