= 1950 UCI Road World Championships =

- Venue: Moorslede, Belgium
- Date: 19-20 August 1950
- Coordinates: 50°53′N 03°04′E
- Events: 2

The 1950 UCI Road World Championships was the 23rd edition of the UCI Road World Championships. It took place between 19-20 August 1950 in Moorslede, Belgium.

The professionals' championship was held on Sunday, August 20, 1950. There were 40 participants. Top cyclists who did not finish the race including Hugo Koblet, Rik Van Steenbergen and Gino Bartali. Belgian Briek Schotte escaped from an eight-man leading group towards the end and became world champion for the second time.

In the same period, the 1950 UCI Track Cycling World Championships was organized in the Stade Vélodrome de Rocourt, near Liège, Belgium.

== Events Summary ==
Event	Gold		Silver		Bronze	
Men's Events
Professional Road Race	Briek Schotte; Belgium	7h 49' 54"	Theo Middelkamp; Netherlands	+ 1' 01"	Ferdinand Kübler; Switzerland	+ 1' 48"
Amateur Road Race	Jack Hoobin; Australia	-	Robert Varnajo; France	-	Alfio Ferrari; Italy	-
