= 1984 UCI Road World Championships =

- Venue: Barcelona, Spain
- Date: 2 September 1984
- Events: 1

The 1984 UCI Road World Championships took place on 2 September 1984 in Barcelona, Catalonia, Spain. Only one race took place due to the Los Angeles Olympic Games.

In the same period, the 1984 UCI Track Cycling World Championships were also organized in Barcelona.

== Results ==
| Race: | Gold: | Time | Silver: | Time | Bronze : | Time |
|---|---|---|---|---|---|---|
Men
| Men's road race | Claude Criquielion; Belgium | 6.46'46" | Claudio Corti; Italy | + 14" | Steve Bauer; Canada | + 1'01" |

== Medal table ==
| Rank | Nation | Gold | Silver | Bronze | Total |
|---|---|---|---|---|---|
| 1 | Belgium (BEL) | 1 | 0 | 0 | 1 |
| 2 | Italy (ITA) | 0 | 1 | 0 | 1 |
| 3 | Canada (CAN) | 0 | 0 | 1 | 1 |
| Totals (3 entries) | | 1 | 1 | 1 | 3 |
