= 1948 UCI Road World Championships =

- Venue: Valkenburg, Netherlands
- Coordinates: 50°50′59″N 5°49′59″E
- Events: 2

The 1948 UCI Road World Championships was the 21st edition of the UCI Road World Championships. It took place on Saturday 21 and Sunday 22 August 1948 in Valkenburg, Netherlands.

For the first time, six riders per country were allowed to participate in the professional race. The Cauberg had to be climbed every lap. Briek Schotte became the winner in the professional cyclists' road race after 266.8 kilometres of cycling (27 laps). Only 10 of the 50 riders who started rode out the race.

In the same period, the 1948 UCI Track Cycling World Championships were organized in the Olympic Stadium of Amsterdam, Netherlands.

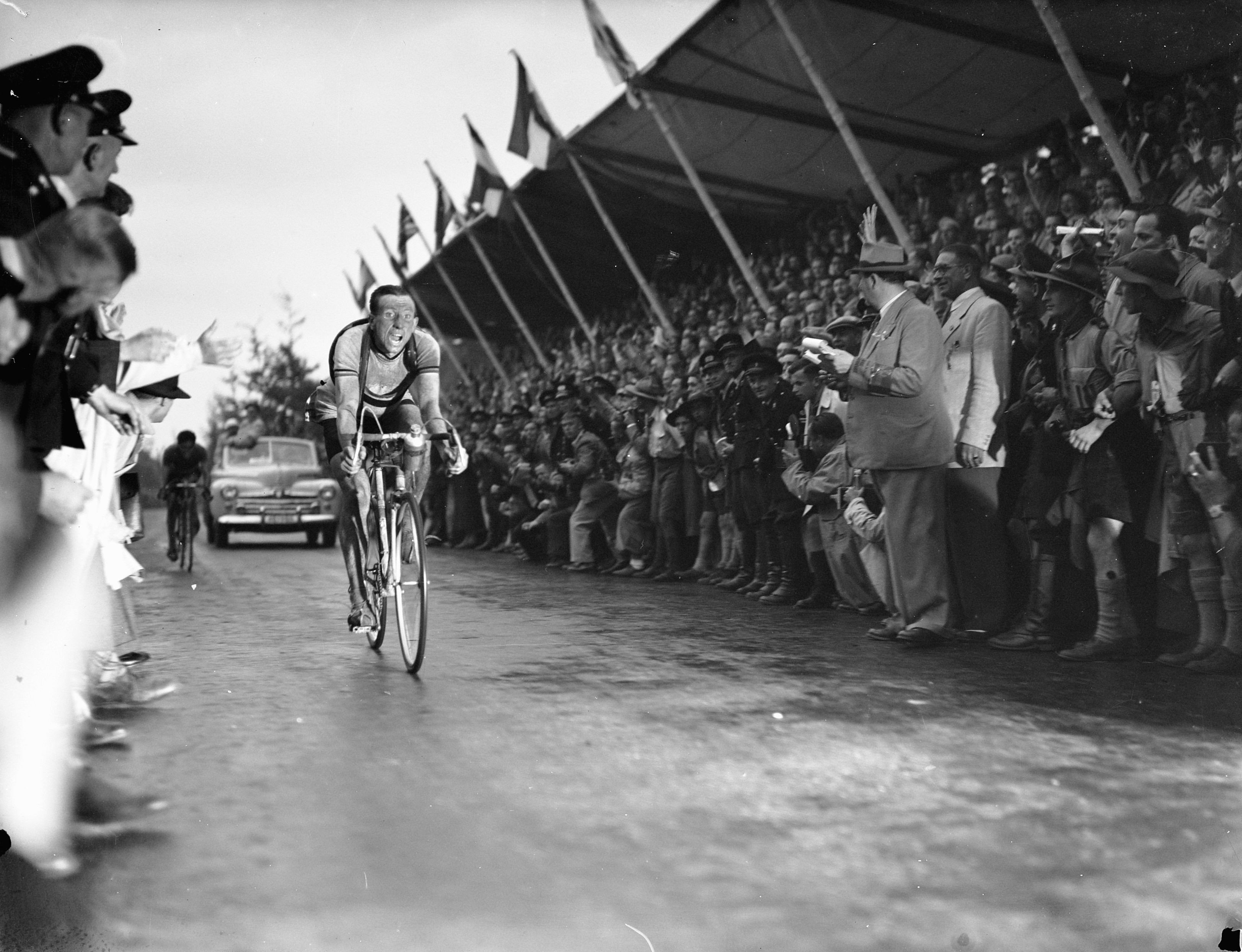
Schotte at the finish, wins the World Championships

Newsreel of the 1948 Professional Road World Championship (in Dutch)

== Events Summary ==
Event	Gold		Silver		Bronze	
Men's Events
Professional Road Race	Briek Schotte; Belgium	7h 28' 17"	Apo Lazaridès; France	+ 1"	Lucien Teisseire; France	+ 3' 41"
Amateur Road Race	Harry Snell; Sweden	-	Liévin Lerno; Belgium	-	Olle Wänlund; Sweden	-
