= 1955 UCI Road World Championships =

- Venue: Frascati, Italy
- Dates: 27 and 28 August
- Coordinates: 41°49′N 12°41′E
- Events: 2

The 1955 UCI Road World Championships was the 28th edition of the UCI Road World Championships. It took place on Saturday 27 and Sunday 28 August in Frascati, Italy.

The race for the amateurs was 188.442 km (or 9 laps). The podium was all Italian.

The race for professionals was 293.182 km (14 laps of almost 21 kilometres). Belgian Stan Ockers rode solo to the world title with more than a one-minute lead. Of the 65 participants, only 20 finished.

In the same period, the 1950 UCI Track Cycling World Championships was organized in the Stade Velodromo Vigorelli in Milan, Italy

== Events Summary ==
Event	Gold		Silver		Bronze	
Men's Events
Professional Road Race	Stan Ockers; Belgium	8h 43' 29"	Jean-Pierre Schmitz; Luxembourg	+ 1' 03"	Germain Derijcke; Belgium	+ 1' 15"
Amateur Road Race	Sante Ranucci; Italy	-	Lino Grassi; Italy	-	Dino Bruni; Italy	-
