= 1936 UCI Road World Championships =

- Venue: Bern, Switzerland
- Date: 6 September 1936
- Coordinates: 46°56′53″N 7°26′51″E
- Events: 2

The 1936 UCI Road World Championships was the sixteenth edition of the UCI Road World Championships.

The championships took place in Bern, Switzerland.

42 amateurs rode in the morning, the 39 professionals in the afternoon. Only 26 amateur and 10 professional cyclists completed their race.

In the same period, the 1936 UCI Track Cycling World Championships was organized in the Oerlikon Velodrome in Zürich.

== Events Summary ==
Event	Gold		Silver		Bronze	
Men's Events
Professional Road Race	Antonin Magne; France	5h 53' 32"	Aldo Bini; Italy	+ 9' 27"	Theo Middelkamp; Netherlands	s.t.
Amateur Road Race	Edgar Buchwalder; Switzerland	-	Gottlieb Weber; Switzerland	-	Pierino Favalli; Italy	-
