= Spain at the UCI Road World Championships =

- IOC code: ESP
- Medals: Gold 10 Silver 15 Bronze 19 Total 44

Spain at the UCI Road World Championships is an overview of the Spanish results at the UCI Road World Championships. The Spanish competitors are selected by coaches of the Royal Spanish Cycling Federation. Apart from cycling events at the four-yearly Summer Olympics, the only times that road cyclists appear in proper national selections (instead of in commercial cycling teams) of one or multiple athletes are the yearly UCI Road World Championships. Because of this, all Spanish national road cycling teams (either elite, amateur or younger teams) only compete as such during one day per year. The nation's first medal, a silver, was earned by Luciano Montero in the men's road race in 1935.

== List of medalists ==
This is a list of all Spanish medals (including elite, amateur, under-23 and junior races). Since the 2012 UCI Road World Championships there is the men's and women's team time trial event for trade teams and these medals are included under the UCI registration country of the team. Note that in these events also foreign cyclists can belong to the "national" team.

Medal	Championship	Name	Event
Silver	(Belgium) 1935 Floreffe	Luciano Montero (ESP)	Men's road race
Silver	(France) 1964 Sallanches	Spain; Ginés García; José Goyeneche; Ramón Sáez; Luis Santamarina	Men's 100km team mountains race
Silver	(Spain) 1965 Lasarte-Oria	José Manuel Lasa (ESP)	Men's amateur road race
Silver	(Spain) 1965 Lasarte-Oria	Spain; Ventura Díaz; José Manuel López; José Manuel Lasa; Domingo Perurena	Men's team time trial
Bronze	(Netherlands) 1967 Heerlen	Ramón Sáez (ESP)	Men's road race
Bronze	(Switzerland) 1971 Mendrisio	José Viejo (ESP)	Men's amateur road race
Bronze	(Spain) 1973 Barcelona	Luis Ocaña (ESP)	Men's road race
Bronze	(France) 1980 Sallanches	Juan Fernández (ESP)	Men's road race
Bronze	(Austria) 1987 Villach	Juan Fernández (ESP)	Men's road race
Bronze	(Belgium) 1988 Ronse	Juan Fernández (ESP)	Men's road race
Bronze	(Germany) 1991 Stuttgart	Miguel Indurain (ESP)	Men's road race
Silver	(Norway) 1993 Oslo	Miguel Indurain (ESP)	Men's road race
Gold	(Colombia) 1995 Duitama	Abraham Olano (ESP)	Men's road race
Gold	(Colombia) 1995 Duitama	Miguel Indurain (ESP)	Men's time trial
Silver	(Colombia) 1995 Duitama	Miguel Indurain (ESP)	Men's road race
Silver	(Colombia) 1995 Duitama	Abraham Olano (ESP)	Men's time trial
Silver	(Spain) 1997 San Sebastián	Óscar Freire (ESP)	Men's under-23 road race
Bronze	(Spain) 1997 San Sebastián	Maria Cagigas (ESP)	Women's junior time trial
Gold	(Netherlands) 1998 Valkenburg	Abraham Olano (ESP)	Men's time trial
Silver	(Netherlands) 1998 Valkenburg	Melcior Mauri (ESP)	Men's time trial
Gold	(Italy) 1999 Treviso-Verona	Óscar Freire (ESP)	Men's road race
Gold	(Italy) 1999 Treviso-Verona	Iván Gutiérrez (ESP)	Men's under-23 time trial
Bronze	(France) 2000 Plouay	Óscar Freire (ESP)	Men's road race
Gold	(Portugal) 2001 Lisbon	Óscar Freire (ESP)	Men's road race
Bronze	(Portugal) 2001 Lisbon	Teodora Ruano (ESP)	Women's time trial
Silver	(Belgium) 2002 Limburg	Francisco Gutiérrez (ESP)	Men's under-23 road race
Bronze	(Belgium) 2002 Limburg	I. González de Galdeano (ESP)	Men's time trial
Bronze	(Belgium) 2002 Limburg	Joane Somarriba (ESP)	Women's road race
Gold	(Canada) 2003 Hamilton	Igor Astarloa (ESP)	Men's road race
Gold	(Canada) 2003 Hamilton	Joane Somarriba (ESP)	Women's time trial
Silver	(Canada) 2003 Hamilton	Alejandro Valverde (ESP)	Men's road race
Gold	(Italy) 2004 Verona	Óscar Freire (ESP)	Men's road race
Silver	(Spain) 2005 Madrid	Alejandro Valverde (ESP)	Men's road race
Silver	(Spain) 2005 Madrid	Iván Gutiérrez (ESP)	Men's time trial
Silver	(Spain) 2005 Madrid	Joane Somarriba (ESP)	Women's time trial
Bronze	(Austria) 2006 Salzburg	Alejandro Valverde (ESP)	Men's road race
Bronze	(Switzerland) 2009 Mendrisio	Joaquim Rodríguez (ESP)	Men's road race
Bronze	(Netherlands) 2012 Valkenburg	Alejandro Valverde (ESP)	Men's road race
Silver	(Italy) 2013 Tuscany	Joaquim Rodríguez (ESP)	Men's road race
Bronze	(Italy) 2013 Tuscany	Alejandro Valverde (ESP)	Men's road race
Bronze	(Spain) 2014 Ponferrada	Alejandro Valverde (ESP)	Men's road race
Bronze	(United States) 2015 Richmond	Movistar Team; Andrey Amador (CRC); Jonathan Castroviejo (ESP); Alex Dowsett (GBR); Ion Izagirre (ESP); Adriano Malori (ITA); Jasha Sütterlin (GER)	Men's team time trial
Bronze	2016 Qatar	Jonathan Castroviejo (ESP)	Men's time trial
Gold	(Austria) 2018 Innsbruck	Alejandro Valverde (ESP)	Men's road race

== Most successful Spanish competitors ==
The list don't include the men's amateur events

Name	Medals	Championships
Óscar Freire	3 gold, 1 silver, 1 bronze	(gold) 1999 Treviso-Verona – Men's road race (gold) 2001 Lisbon – Men's road race (gold) 2004 Verona – Men's road race (silver) 1997 San Sebastián – Men's under-23 road race (bronze) 2000 Plouay – Men's road race
Abraham Olano	2 gold, 1 silver, 0 bronze	(gold) 1995 Duitama – Men's road race (gold) 1998 Valkenburg – Men's time trial (silver) 1995 Duitama – Men's time trial
Alejandro Valverde	1 gold, 2 silver, 4 bronze	(gold) 2018 Innsbruck – Men's road race (silver) 2003 Hamilton – Men's road race (silver) 2005 Madrid – Men's road race (bronze) 2006 Salzburg – Men's road race (bronze) 2012 Valkenburg – Men's road race (bronze) 2013 Tuscany – Men's road race (bronze) 2014 Ponferrada – Men's road race
Miguel Indurain	1 gold, 2 silver, 1 bronze	(gold) 1995 Duitama – Men's time trial (silver) 1993 Oslo – Men's road race (silver) 1995 Duitama – Men's road race (bronze) 1991 Suttgart – Men's road race
Joane Somarriba	1 gold, 1 silver, 1 bronze	(gold) 2003 Hamilton – Women's time trial (silver) 2005 Madrid – Women's time trial (bronze) 2002 Limburg – Women's road race

== Medals by discipline ==
Updated after 2018 UCI Road World Championships

Event	Gold	Silver	Bronze	Total	Rank
Men's (professional) road race	6	6	12	24	
Men's time trial	2	3	2	7	
Women's time trial	1	1	1	3	
Men's under-23 road race	0	2	0	2	
Men's team time trial	0	1	1	2	
Men's amateur road race	0	1	1	2	
Men's under-23 time trial	1	0	0	1	
100 km mountains race	0	1	0	1	
Women's road race	0	0	1	1	
Women's junior time trial	0	0	1	1	
Total	10	15	19	44	
