= Cycling in Spain =

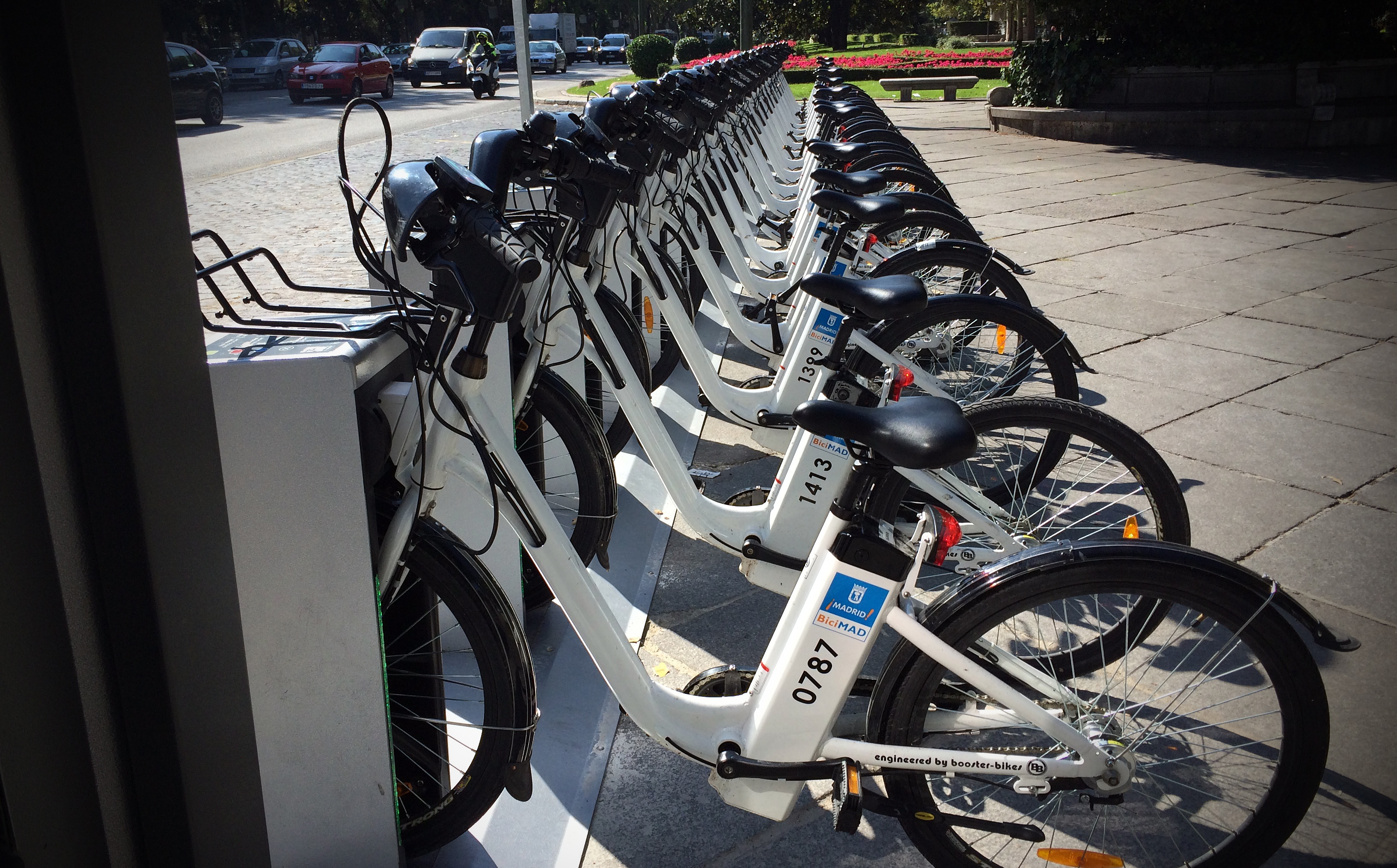
Public bicycles for renting in Plaza de Cibeles, Madrid

Cycling is a mode of transport in Spain with 20% of the people listing the bicycle as their mode of transport, though some Spanish cities as Valencia, Vitoria and Zaragoza well exceed that with 45%.

There is some cycling infrastructure such as cycle paths, cycle tracks, protected intersections, and bicycle parking, but lacks cycle paths in regional and, mainly, national roads.

On the other hand, in an overview about the traffic, Spain had 8.1 deaths in annual number of deaths from injuries (unintentional and intentional) among 1 to 14-year-old children during 1991–95, expressed per 100,000 children in the age group.

A Plan Estratégico Estatal de la Bicicleta (State Strategy Plan of the Bicycle) has been planned, but only two of the more than forty measures have been approved from the reform of the Reglamento General de Circulación (National Road Rules).

== List of cycleways ==
- TransAndalus
- 1800 km of public greenways on former railway routes throughout Spain
- TransCAM - Trans-Comunidad Autónoma de Madrid

== Sport ==
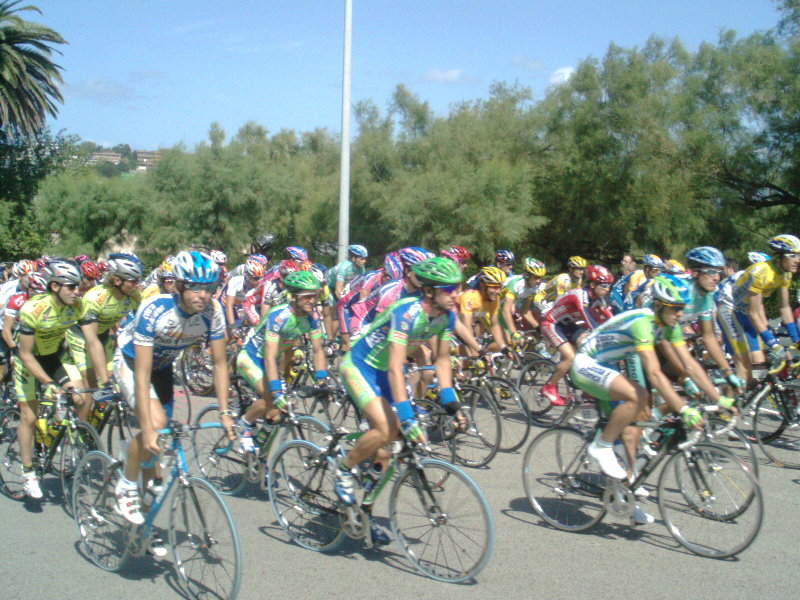
Cycling event in Santander

Cycling has been an important sport in Spain since the 1940s. The Vuelta a España (Spanish for "Tour of Spain") is one of the most important cycling events in the world, together with the Tour de France (French for "Tour of France") and Giro d'Italia (Italian for "Tour of Italy") racing tournaments.

Several Spanish cycling athletes have won the Tour de France, including Federico Bahamontes, Luis Ocaña, Pedro Delgado, Óscar Pereiro, Alberto Contador, and Carlos Sastre. The most successful Spanish cyclist is Miguel Indurain. He won the Tour de France in five consecutive years between 1991 and 1995. He also won the Giro d'Italia in two consecutive years (1992 and 1993), the 1995 Road World Championship time trial and the gold medal in the 1996 Olympic time trial.

More recently, in 2008, Sastre became the seventh and third consecutive Spaniard to win the Tour de France, then followed by Contador winning his second tour in 2009's edition. Contador was thought to have repeated his win in 2010 but the day before Stage 17, the queen stage finishing with atop the Col du Tourmalet, Contador tested positive for performance-enhancing substance Clenbuterol, although he claimed it was a result of consuming contaminated beef and in January 2012, the Court of Arbitration for Sport ruled him guilty and gave him a two-year ban backdated from July 21, 2010 and had all his results achieved after July 21 erased, including victory in the 2010 Giro d'Italia and a 5th-place finish and most aggressive rider award for stage 19 at the 2011 Tour de France. Since returning from the ban, Contador has won the Vuelta twice, in 2012 and 2014.

Óscar Freire shares the distinction of being one of four men to win the World Road Racing Championship three times, as well as being a three-time winner of one of the most prestigious one-day classic cycle races, the Milan–San Remo. Abraham Olano won the Vuelta a España in 1998, and is the only man to win World Championships in both the road race (1995) and time trial (1998).

Spain has also produced some notable mountain bikers like José Antonio Hermida and track racers like olimpic medalists Joan Llaneras, José Manuel Moreno Periñán, José Antonio Escuredo or Sergi Escobar as well as multi-world champion Guillermo Timoner.

== See also ==
- ConBici
- Cycling in Madrid
- EuroVelo
- Transport in Spain
- Bicycle culture
- List of bicycle-sharing systems
- List of countries by traffic-related death rate
- Outline of cycling
