= Slovak National Time Trial Championships =

National road cycling championship in Slovakia

The Jersey for Slovak Champion

The Slovak National Time Trial Championships have been held since 1993.

== Men ==
Year	Gold	Silver	Bronze
1997	Miroslav Lipták	Ján Valach	Ondrej Slobodník
1998	Ján Valach	Miroslav Lipták	Ondrej Slobodník
1999	Ondrej Slobodník	Ján Valach	Milan Dvorščík
2000	Ondrej Slobodník	Róbert Nagy	Jan Spak
2001	Ján Valach	Robert Glajza	Róbert Nagy
2002	Ján Valach	Martin Riška	Miroslav Keliar
2003	Róbert Nagy	Ondrej Slobodník	Miroslav Keliar
2004	Matej Jurčo	Ján Valach	Róbert Nagy
2005	Matej Jurčo	Ján Valach	Ondrej Slobodnik
2006	Matej Jurčo	Zoltán Remák	Martin Riška
2007	Edition cancelled		
2008	Matej Jurčo	Róbert Nagy	Roman Broniš
2009	Roman Broniš	Pavol Polievka	Róbert Nagy
2010	Martin Velits	Pavol Polievka	Róbert Nagy
2011	Pavol Polievka	Roman Broniš	Róbert Nagy
2012	Peter Velits	Martin Velits	Matej Jurčo
2013	Peter Velits	Maroš Kováč	Milan Barényi
2014	Peter Velits	Maroš Kováč	Patrik Tybor
2015	Peter Sagan	Maroš Kováč	Patrik Tybor
2016	Marek Čanecký	Maroš Kováč	Roman Broniš
2017	Marek Čanecký	Patrik Tybor	Adrián Babič
2018	Marek Čanecký	Patrik Tybor	Martin Haring
2019	Ján Andrej Cully	Marek Čanecký	Patrik Tybor
2020	Ján Andrej Cully	Martin Haring	Ronald Kuba
2021	Ronald Kuba	Lukáš Kubiš	Ján Andrej Cully
2022	Ján Andrej Cully	Marek Čanecký	Ronald Kuba
2023	Matúš Štoček	Martin Jurík	Marek Čanecký
2024	Lukáš Kubiš	Matthias Schwarzbacher	Dominik Dunár

== Women ==
Year	Gold	Silver	Bronze
1993	Lenka Ilavská	Elena Barillová	Iveta Sitárová
1994	Lenka Ilavská	Elena Barillová	Ildikó Paczová
1995	Lenka Ilavská	Jaroslava Kománková	Elena Barillová
1996	Lenka Ilavská	Elena Barillová	Jaroslava Kománková
1997	Lenka Ilavská	Ildiko Paczová	Elena Barillová
1998	Lenka Ilavská	Elena Barillová	Janette Böhmová
1999	Elena Barillová	Janette Böhmová	Jaroslava Kománková
2000	Lenka Ilavská	Zlatica Bazola-Gavláková	Elena Barillová
2001	Lenka Ilavská	Zlatica Bazola-Gavláková	Elena Barillová
2002	Zlatica Bazola-Gavláková	Elena Barillová	Eva Potočná
2003			
2004			
2005			
2006	Zuzana Vojtašová		
2007			
2008	Katarína Uhláriková	Eva Potocna	
2009	Alžbeta Pavlendová	Monika Kadlecová	Katarína Uhláriková
2010	Alžbeta Pavlendová	Monika Kadlecová	Zuzana Vojtášová
2011	Janka Števková	Alžbeta Pavlendová	Kristína Lapinová
2012	Alžbeta Pavlendová	Michaela Maláriková	Kristína Lapinová
2013	Alžbeta Pavlendová	Michaela Maláriková	Monika Kadlecová
2014	Michaela Maláriková	Janka Števková	Livia Hanesová
2015	Tereza Medveďová	Alžbeta Pavlendová	Livia Hanesová
2016	Lucia Valachová	Janka Števková	Tatiana Jaseková
2017	Janka Števková	Lucia Valachová	Tereza Medveďová
2018	Tatiana Jaseková	Livia Hanesová	Alžbeta Pavlendová
2019	Tatiana Jaseková	Mariana Findrová	Andrea Juhásová
2020	Tereza Medveďová	Janka Števková	Tatiana Jaseková
2021	Nora Jenčušová	Janka Števková	Nikola Čorbová
2022	Nora Jenčušová	Janka Števková	Petra Machálková
2023	Nora Jenčušová	Rebeka Cully	Tereza Medveďová
2024	Nora Jenčušová	Zuzana Michaličková	Alžbeta Bačíková

== See also ==
- Slovak National Road Race Championships
- National Road Cycling Championships
