= 2021 UCI Road World Championships – Men's time trial =

Cycling event

Men's time trial
2021 UCI Road World Championships
- Time trial Rainbow jersey

Race details
- Dates: 19 September 2021
- Distance: 43.3 km (26.9 mi)
- Winning time: 47' 47.83"

Medalists
| | Gold | Filippo Ganna (ITA) |
| | Silver | Wout van Aert (BEL) |
| | Bronze | Remco Evenepoel (BEL) |

The Men's time trial of the 2021 UCI Road World Championships was a cycling event that took place on 19 September 2021 in Flanders, Belgium. It was the 28th edition of the championship, for which Filippo Ganna of Italy is the defending champion, having won in 2020. Ganna retained his title after beating Belgian riders Wout van Aert and Remco Evenepoel.

== Participating nations ==
58 cyclists from 39 nations competed in the event. The number of cyclists per nation is shown in parentheses.

- Algeria (1)
- Austria (1)
- Belgium (2)
- Bulgaria (1)
- Canada (1)
- Colombia (1)
- Cyprus (1)
- Czech Republic (1)
- Denmark (2)
- Ethiopia (2)
- France (2)
- Germany (2)
- Ghana (1)
- Great Britain (2)
- Hungary (1)
- Iceland (1)
- Ireland (2)
- Italy (3)
- Kazakhstan (2)
- Lithuania (1)
- Netherlands (1)
- New Zealand (1)
- Norway (1)
- Pakistan (2)
- Panama (2)
- Poland (1)
- Portugal (2)
- Qatar (1)
- Russian Cycling Federation (1)
- Serbia (1)
- Slovakia (1)
- Slovenia (2)
- South Africa (2)
- Spain (1)
- Switzerland (2)
- Syria (1)
- Ukraine (2)
- United States (2)
- Uzbekistan (2)

== Final classification ==
| Rank | Rider | Time |
|---|---|---|
| 1st place, gold medalist(s) | (Italy) Filippo Ganna (ITA) | 47' 47.83" |
| 2nd place, silver medalist(s) | (Belgium) Wout van Aert (BEL) | + 5.37" |
| 3rd place, bronze medalist(s) | (Belgium) Remco Evenepoel (BEL) | + 43.34" |
| 4 | (Denmark) Kasper Asgreen (DEN) | + 45.64" |
| 5 | (Switzerland) Stefan Küng (SUI) | + 1' 06.20" |
| 6 | (Germany) Tony Martin (GER) | + 1' 17.27" |
| 7 | (Switzerland) Stefan Bissegger (SUI) | + 1' 25.44" |
| 8 | (United Kingdom) Ethan Hayter (GBR) | + 1' 26.21" |
| 9 | (Italy) Edoardo Affini (ITA) | + 1' 48.70" |
| 10 | (Slovenia) Tadej Pogačar (SVN) | + 1' 52.54" |
| 11 | (Germany) Max Walscheid (GER) | + 1' 53.47" |
| 12 | (Netherlands) Jos van Emden (NED) | + 1' 54.12" |
| 13 | (Portugal) Nelson Oliveira (POR) | + 1' 54.95" |
| 14 | (France) Rémi Cavagna (FRA) | + 1' 58.42" |
| 15 | (Slovenia) Jan Tratnik (SVN) | + 2' 04.06" |
| 16 | (United Kingdom) Daniel Bigham (GBR) | + 2' 10.62" |
| 17 | (Denmark) Mikkel Bjerg (DEN) | + 2' 15.47" |
| 18 | (United States) Lawson Craddock (USA) | + 2' 36.66" |
| 19 | (South Africa) Ryan Gibbons (RSA) | + 2' 37.08" |
| 20 | (Canada) Hugo Houle (CAN) | + 3' 02.99" |
| 21 | (Italy) Matteo Sobrero (ITA) | + 3' 05.40" |
| 22 | (United States) Brandon McNulty (USA) | + 3' 08.56" |
| 23 | (New Zealand) Tom Scully (NZL) | + 3' 09.54" |
| 24 | (Poland) Michał Kwiatkowski (POL) | + 3' 09.55" |
| 25 | (Spain) Carlos Rodríguez (ESP) | + 3' 23.61" |
| 26 | (Norway) Andreas Leknessund (NOR) | + 3' 27.08" |
| 27 | (France) Benjamin Thomas (FRA) | + 3' 27.57" |
| 28 | (Cyprus) Andreas Miltiadis (CYP) | + 3' 29.35" |
| 29 | (Hungary) Barnabás Peák (HUN) | + 3' 33.07" |
| 30 | (Portugal) Rafael Reis (POR) | + 3' 34.52" |
| 31 | (Kazakhstan) Dmitriy Gruzdev (KAZ) | + 3' 58.97" |
| 32 | (Czech Republic) Josef Černý (CZE) | + 3' 59.98" |
| 33 | (Republic of Ireland) Ryan Mullen (IRL) | + 4' 11.90" |
| 34 | (Colombia) Rigoberto Urán (COL) | + 4' 17.87" |
| 35 | (Serbia) Ognjen Ilić (SRB) | + 4' 18.28" |
| 36 | (Kazakhstan) Daniil Fominykh (KAZ) | + 5' 02.05" |
| 37 | (Austria) Felix Ritzinger (AUT) | + 5' 07.99" |
| 38 | Petr Rikunov (RCF) | + 5' 09.95" |
| 39 | (Republic of Ireland) Marcus Christie (IRL) | + 5' 19.37" |
| 40 | (Ukraine) Mykhaylo Kononenko (UKR) | + 5' 46.63" |
| 41 | (Panama) Christofer Jurado (PAN) | + 6' 09.29" |
| 42 | (Lithuania) Venantas Lašinis (LTU) | + 6' 24.87" |
| 43 | (Uzbekistan) Muradjan Khalmuratov (UZB) | + 6' 28.73" |
| 44 | (Panama) Franklin Archibold (PAN) | + 6' 48.12" |
| 45 | (Slovakia) Ronald Kuba (SVK) | + 7' 52.37" |
| 46 | (Iceland) Rúnar Örn Ágústsson (ISL) | + 8' 07.77" |
| 47 | (Syria) Nazir Jaser (SYR) | + 8' 19.83" |
| 48 | (Thailand) Sarawut Sirironnachai (THA) | + 8' 34.96" |
| 49 | (Bulgaria) Spas Gyurov (BUL) | + 9' 11.99" |
| 50 | (Uzbekistan) Akramjon Sunnatov (UZB) | + 10' 42.54" |
| 51 | (Qatar) Fadhel Al Khater (QAT) | + 10' 56.19" |
| 52 | (Pakistan) Ali Jawaid (PAK) | + 11' 05.83" |
| 53 | (Algeria) Lotfi Tchambaz (ALG) | + 11' 43.12" |
| 54 | (Pakistan) Khalil Amjad (PAK) | + 13' 19.67" |
| 55 | (Ghana) Christopher Symonds (GHA) | + 18' 09.02" |
