= Nora Jenčušová =

Slovak cyclist (born 2002)

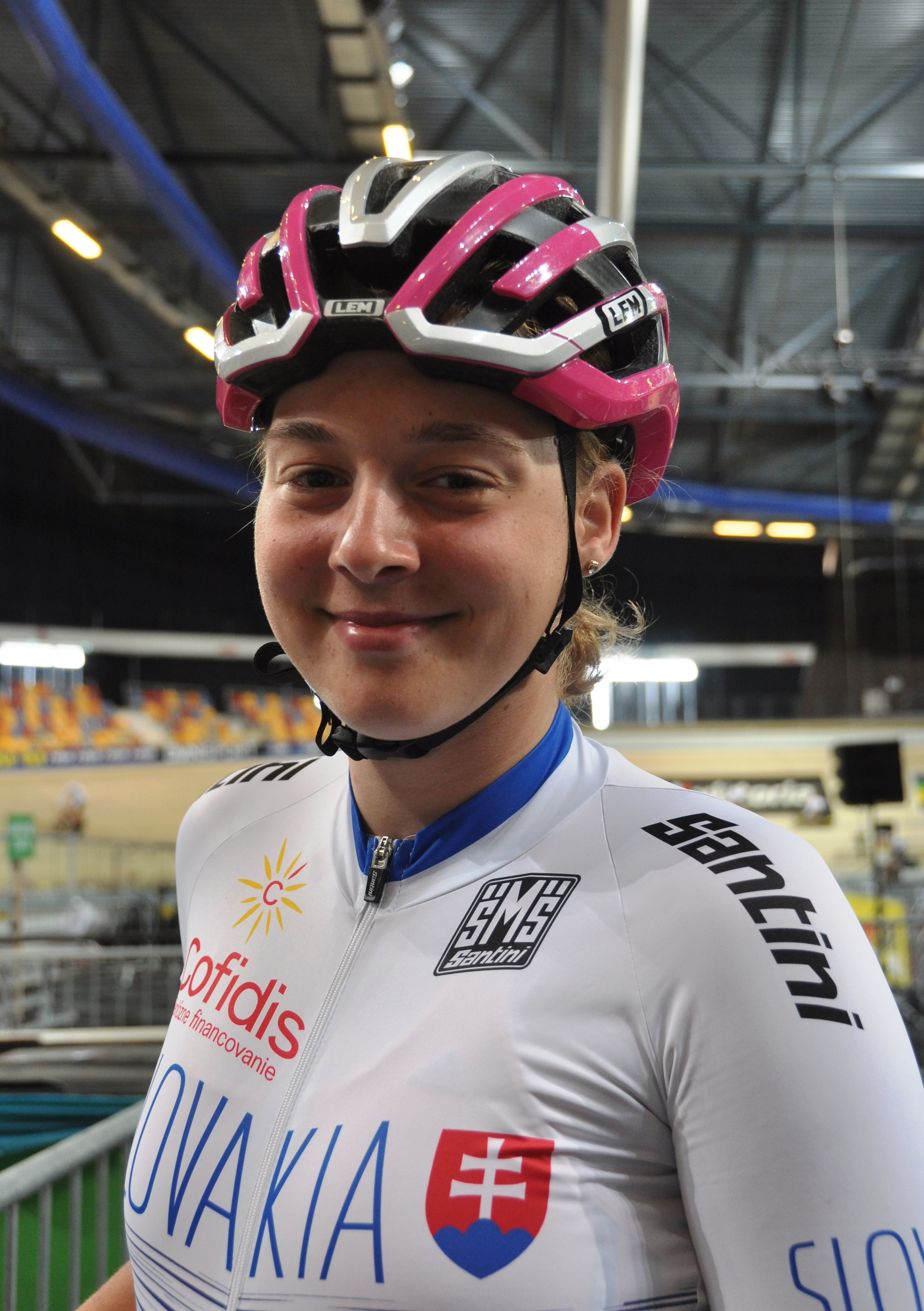
- Jenčušová in 2021

Personal information
- Born: 14 April 2002 (age 24) Spišská Nová Ves, Slovakia
- Height: 176 cm (5 ft 9 in)
- Weight: 74 kg (163 lb)

Cycling career
- Sport: Cycling
- Current team: Vini Fantini–BePink
- Disciplines: Road; Track
- Role: Rider

Professional team
- 2021–: Bepink

Nora Jenčušová (born 14 April 2002) is a Slovak road and track cyclist, who currently rides for UCI Women's Continental Team Vini Fantini–BePink.

== Biography ==
Nora Jenčušová was born on 14 April 2002 in Spišská Nová Ves. As a child, she competed in triathlon, which brought her to bicycle racing. She is a student of the Technical University of Košice.

== Career ==
Jenčušová was first noticed in the cycling world in 2020, when she became the European junior champion in the scratch. Since 2021 she is a member of the Italian professional team Bepink.

She won the road race at the Czech and Slovak National Championships in 2022 and 2023 after finishing third in 2021. Additionally, she won the Slovak National Time Trial Championships each year from 2021 to 2024.

In December 2023, she was selected for the 2024 Summer Olympics. Her Olympics appearance will be the first time a Slovak female cyclist will compete at the Olympics since her coach Lenka Ilavská competed at the 1996 Summer Olympics.

Jenčušová finished 25th at the Women's individual road race of the 2024 Olympics.

== Major results ==
=== Road ===
2019
National Junior Championships

1st Road race
1st Time trial

2020
1st Time trial, National Junior Championships
8th Time trial, European Junior Championships
2021
National Championships

1st Time trial
3rd Road race

2022
National Championships

1st Road race
1st Time trial

2023
National Championships

1st Road race
1st Time trial

National Under-23 Championships

1st Road race
1st Time trial

1st Regiónom Nitrianskeho Kraja
2nd GP of the Mayor of the city Žiar nad Hronom
4th Time trial, European Under-23 Championships
4th Overall Belgrade GP Woman Tour
9th Respect Ladies Race Slovakia
2024
National Championships

1st Time trial

=== Track ===
2020
1st Scratch, UEC European Junior Championships
