= 2018 Okolo Slovenska =

2018 Tour of Slovakia
2018 UCI Europe Tour

Race details
- Dates: September 12–16, 2018
- Stages: 5 (Note: 4 road stages and a prologue time trial.)
- Distance: 695.5 km (432.2 mi)
- Winning time: 16h 33' 08"

Results
Jersey awarded to the overall winner	Winner	Julian Alaphilippe (FRA)	(Quick-Step Floors)
	Second	Jan Tratnik (SLO)	(CCC–Sprandi–Polkowice)
	Third	Cesare Benedetti (ITA)	(Bora–Hansgrohe)
Jersey awarded to the points classification winner	Points	Martin Haring (SVK)	(Dukla Banská Bystrica)
Jersey awarded to the mountains classification winner	Mountains	Giulio Ciccone (ITA)	(Bardiani–CSF)
Jersey awarded to the youth classification winner	Youth	Tobias Foss (NOR)	(Uno-X Norwegian Development Team)
	Team	CCC–Sprandi–Polkowice	

The 2018 Okolo Slovenska (transl. Tour of Slovakia) was a five-stage men's professional road cycling race. The race is the 62nd edition of the Okolo Slovenska. It was rated as a 2.1 event as part of the 2018 UCI Europe Tour. The race started in Poprad on 12 September and finish on 16 September in Galanta.

The Frenchmen rider Julian Alaphilippe of Quick-Step Floors won the general classification, by taking first place at the summit finish in Štrbské Pleso. He won the race by sixteen seconds overall, from CCC–Sprandi–Polkowice's Jan Tratnik, Benedetti completed the podium.

== Teams ==
The 21 teams invited to the race were:

UCI World Tour teams

- Quick-Step Floors
- Bora–Hansgrohe

UCI Professional Continental teams

- CCC–Sprandi–Polkowice
- Cofidis
- Roompot–Nederlandse Loterij
- Bardiani–CSF
- Gazprom–RusVelo

UCI Continental teams

- Dukla Banská Bystrica
- Adria Mobil
- Uno-X Norwegian Development Team
- Riwal CeramicSpeed
- Elkov–Author
- Team Hurom
- WSA–Pushbikers
- Kőbánya Cycling Team
- Pannon Cycling Team
- Team Novak
- Apple Team

National teams

- Slovakia
- Belgium
- Germany

== Route ==
Stage characteristics and winners
Stage	Date	Course	Distance	Type	Winner
Prologue	12 September	Poprad	1.6 km (1 mi)	Individual time trial	Bob Jungels (LUX)
1	13 September	Poprad to Štrbské Pleso	164.4 km (102 mi)	Mountain stage	Julian Alaphilippe (FRA)
2	14 September	Ružomberok to Dubnica nad Váhom	191.7 km (119 mi)	Hilly stage	Rüdiger Selig (GER)
3	15 September	Dubnica nad Váhom to Nitra	180.6 km (112 mi)	Flat stage	Matteo Pelucchi (ITA)
4	16 September	Nitra to Galanta	157.2 km (98 mi)	Flat stage	Fabio Jakobsen (NED)
	Total		695.5 km (432 mi)		

== Stages ==
=== Prologue ===
12 September 2018 Poprad, 1.6 km (1 mi), (Individual time trial)

Result of Prologue
Rank	Rider	Team	Time
1	Bob Jungels (LUX)	Quick-Step Floors	2' 02"
2	Yves Lampaert (BEL)	Quick-Step Floors	+ 0"
3	Christophe Laporte (FRA)	Cofidis	+ 0"
4	Julian Alaphilippe (FRA)	Quick-Step Floors	+ 1"
5	Fabio Jakobsen (NED)	Quick-Step Floors	+ 2"
6	Jan Tratnik (SLO)	CCC–Sprandi–Polkowice	+ 2"
7	Kamil Gradek (POL)	CCC–Sprandi–Polkowice	+ 2"
8	Niki Terpstra (NED)	Quick-Step Floors	+ 2"
9	Dušan Rajović (SRB)	Adria Mobil	+ 3"
10	Johannes Schinnagel (GER)	Bora–Hansgrohe	+ 3"

General classification after Prologue
Rank	Rider	Team	Time
1	Bob Jungels (LUX)	Quick-Step Floors	2' 02"
2	Yves Lampaert (BEL)	Quick-Step Floors	+ 0"
3	Christophe Laporte (FRA)	Cofidis	+ 0"
4	Julian Alaphilippe (FRA)	Quick-Step Floors	+ 1"
5	Fabio Jakobsen (NED)	Quick-Step Floors	+ 2"
6	Jan Tratnik (SLO)	CCC–Sprandi–Polkowice	+ 2"
7	Kamil Gradek (POL)	CCC–Sprandi–Polkowice	+ 2"
8	Niki Terpstra (NED)	Quick-Step Floors	+ 2"
9	Dušan Rajović (SRB)	Adria Mobil	+ 3"
10	Johannes Schinnagel (GER)	Bora–Hansgrohe	+ 3"

=== Stage 1 ===
13 September 2018 Poprad to Štrbské Pleso, 164.4 km (102 mi)

Result of Stage 1
Rank	Rider	Team	Time
1	Julian Alaphilippe (FRA)	Quick-Step Floors	4h 14' 40"
2	Ben Hermans (BEL)	Belgium (national)	+ 0"
3	Attila Valter (HUN)	Pannon Cycling Team	+ 0"
4	Jan Tratnik (SLO)	CCC–Sprandi–Polkowice	+ 0"
5	Pieter Weening (NED)	Roompot–Nederlandse Loterij	+ 2"
6	Ildar Arslanov (RUS)	Gazprom–RusVelo	+ 4"
7	Cesare Benedetti (ITA)	Bora–Hansgrohe	+ 4"
8	Nick van der Lijke (NED)	Roompot–Nederlandse Loterij	+ 5"
9	Radoslav Rogina (CRO)	Adria Mobil	+ 5"
10	Tobias Foss (NOR)	Uno-X Norwegian Development Team	+ 5"

General classification after Stage 1
Rank	Rider	Team	Time
1	Julian Alaphilippe (FRA)	Quick-Step Floors	4h 16' 33"
2	Jan Tratnik (SLO)	CCC–Sprandi–Polkowice	+ 11"
3	Attila Valter (HUN)	Pannon Cycling Team	+ 15"
4	Ben Hermans (BEL)	Belgium (national)	+ 15"
5	Josef Černý (CZE)	Elkov–Author	+ 19"
6	Tobias Foss (NOR)	Uno-X Norwegian Development Team	+ 20"
7	Cesare Benedetti (ITA)	Bora–Hansgrohe	+ 20"
8	Steff Cras (BEL)	Belgium (national)	+ 20"
9	Pieter Weening (NED)	Roompot–Nederlandse Loterij	+ 20"
10	Ildar Arslanov (RUS)	Gazprom–RusVelo	+ 24"

=== Stage 2 ===
14 September 2018 Ružomberok to Dubnica nad Váhom, 191.7 km (119 mi)

Result of Stage 2
Rank	Rider	Team	Time
1	Rüdiger Selig (GER)	Bora–Hansgrohe	4h 32' 32"
2	Yves Lampaert (BEL)	Quick-Step Floors	+ 0"
3	Zdeněk Štybar (CZE)	Quick-Step Floors	+ 0"
4	Cesare Benedetti (ITA)	Bora–Hansgrohe	+ 2"
5	Julian Alaphilippe (FRA)	Quick-Step Floors	+ 2"
6	Ben Hermans (BEL)	Belgium (national)	+ 10"
7	Michael Bresciani (ITA)	Bardiani–CSF	+ 10"
8	Nick van der Lijke (NED)	Roompot–Nederlandse Loterij	+ 10"
9	Niki Terpstra (NED)	Quick-Step Floors	+ 10"
10	Adrian Kurek (POL)	CCC–Sprandi–Polkowice	+ 10"

General classification after Stage 2
Rank	Rider	Team	Time
1	Julian Alaphilippe (FRA)	Quick-Step Floors	8h 49' 04"
2	Jan Tratnik (SLO)	CCC–Sprandi–Polkowice	+ 16"
3	Cesare Benedetti (ITA)	Bora–Hansgrohe	+ 22"
4	Ben Hermans (BEL)	Belgium (national)	+ 26"
5	Josef Černý (CZE)	Elkov–Author	+ 28"
6	Tobias Foss (NOR)	Uno-X Norwegian Development Team	+ 31"
7	Steff Cras (BEL)	Belgium (national)	+ 31"
8	Pieter Weening (NED)	Roompot–Nederlandse Loterij	+ 31"
9	Nick van der Lijke (NED)	Roompot–Nederlandse Loterij	+ 34"
10	Ildar Arslanov (RUS)	Gazprom–RusVelo	+ 35"

=== Stage 3 ===
15 September 2018 Dubnica nad Váhom to Nitra, 180.6 km (112 mi)

Result of Stage 3
Rank	Rider	Team	Time
1	Matteo Pelucchi (ITA)	Bora–Hansgrohe	4h 22' 11"
2	Fabio Jakobsen (NED)	Quick-Step Floors	+ 0"
3	Yves Lampaert (BEL)	Quick-Step Floors	+ 0"
4	Christophe Laporte (FRA)	Cofidis	+ 0"
5	Rüdiger Selig (GER)	Bora–Hansgrohe	+ 0"
6	Szymon Sajnok (POL)	CCC–Sprandi–Polkowice	+ 0"
7	Dušan Rajović (SRB)	Adria Mobil	+ 0"
8	Michael Bresciani (ITA)	Bardiani–CSF	+ 0"
9	Marco Maronese (ITA)	Bardiani–CSF	+ 0"
10	Ahmed Galdoune (MAR)	Kőbánya Cycling Team	+ 0"

General classification after Stage 3
Rank	Rider	Team	Time
1	Julian Alaphilippe (FRA)	Quick-Step Floors	13h 11' 15"
2	Jan Tratnik (SLO)	CCC–Sprandi–Polkowice	+ 16"
3	Cesare Benedetti (ITA)	Bora–Hansgrohe	+ 22"
4	Ben Hermans (BEL)	Belgium (national)	+ 26"
5	Josef Černý (CZE)	Elkov–Author	+ 28"
6	Tobias Foss (NOR)	Uno-X Norwegian Development Team	+ 31"
7	Steff Cras (BEL)	Belgium (national)	+ 31"
8	Pieter Weening (NED)	Roompot–Nederlandse Loterij	+ 31"
9	Nick van der Lijke (NED)	Roompot–Nederlandse Loterij	+ 34"
10	Ildar Arslanov (RUS)	Gazprom–RusVelo	+ 35"

=== Stage 4 ===
16 September 2018 Nitra to Galanta, 157.2 km (98 mi)

Result of Stage 4
Rank	Rider	Team	Time
1	Fabio Jakobsen (NED)	Quick-Step Floors	3h 21' 53"
2	Matteo Pelucchi (ITA)	Bora–Hansgrohe	+ 0"
3	Christophe Laporte (FRA)	Cofidis	+ 0"
4	Sebastian Lander (DEN)	Riwal CeramicSpeed	+ 0"
5	Marco Maronese (ITA)	Bardiani–CSF	+ 0"
6	Cesare Benedetti (ITA)	Bora–Hansgrohe	+ 0"
7	Michael Bresciani (ITA)	Bardiani–CSF	+ 0"
8	Ahmed Galdoune (MAR)	Kőbánya Cycling Team	+ 0"
9	Dušan Rajović (SRB)	Adria Mobil	+ 0"
10	Mirco Maestri (ITA)	Bardiani–CSF	+ 0"

== Classification leadership ==
In the 2018 Tour of Slovakia, five jerseys were awarded. The general classification was calculated by adding each cyclist's finishing times on each stage. The leader of the general classification received a yellow jersey sponsored by national lottery TIPOS. This classification was considered the most important of the 2018 Tour of Slovakia, and the winner of the classification was considered the winner of the race.

Points classification points for the top 10 positions by type
Type		1	2	3	4	5	6	7	8	9	10
Individual time trial	Prologue	12	10	8	7	6	5	4	3	2	1
	Stage finishes	20	15	12	10	8	6	4	3	2	1
	Intermediate sprint	8	5	3	2	1	0				

The second classification was the points classification. Riders were awarded points for finishing in the top ten in a stage. Points were also won in intermediate sprints. The leader of the points classification was awarded a white jersey with blue polka-dots sponsored by Škoda.

Points for the mountains classification
Position	1	2	3	4	5	6
Points for Category 1	10	7	5	3	2	1
Points for Category 2	6	4	2	1	0	

There was also a mountains classification for which points were awarded for reaching the top of a climb before other riders. The climbs were categorized, in order of increasing difficulty, as second and first-category. The leadership of the mountains classification was marked by a white jersey with red polka-dots sponsored by private equity company janom.

The fourth jersey represented the under-23 classification, marked by a white jersey sponsored by Minister of Education, Science, Research and Sport. Only riders born after 1 January 1996 were eligible; the under-23 best placed rider in the general classification was the leader of the under 23 classification. Additionally there was also a classification for Slovakian riders, marked by a white, blue and red jersey. Only Slovakian riders were eligible and they were awarded according to their placement in the general classification of the race.

There was also a classification for Combativity given after each stage to the rider considered, by the organisers, the most combative rider. The winner wore a red bib for the next stage. The final classification was the team classification, in which the times of the best three cyclists in a team on each stage were added together; the leading team at the end of the race was the team with the lowest cumulative time.

Classification leadership by stage
Stage	Winner	General classification	Points classification	Mountains classification	Under-23 rider classification	Best Slovakian rider classification	Combativity classification	Team classification
P	Bob Jungels	Bob Jungels	Yves Lampaert	Christophe Laporte	Fabio Jakobsen	Erik Baška	not awarded	Quick-Step Floors
1	Julian Alaphilippe	Julian Alaphilippe	Martin Haring	Giulio Ciccone	Attila Valter	Matúš Štoček	Martin Haring	CCC–Sprandi–Polkowice
2	Rüdiger Selig	Julian Alaphilippe	Julian Alaphilippe	Giulio Ciccone	Tobias Foss	Matúš Štoček	Umberto Orsini	CCC–Sprandi–Polkowice
3	Matteo Pelucchi	Julian Alaphilippe	Martin Haring	Giulio Ciccone	Tobias Foss	Matúš Štoček	Patrik Tybor	CCC–Sprandi–Polkowice
4	Fabio Jakobsen	Julian Alaphilippe	Martin Haring	Giulio Ciccone	Tobias Foss	Matúš Štoček	Andreas Stokbro	CCC–Sprandi–Polkowice
Final		Julian Alaphilippe	Martin Haring	Giulio Ciccone	Tobias Foss	Matúš Štoček	not awarded	CCC–Sprandi–Polkowice

- In stage three, Jan Tratnik, who was second in the points classification, wore the white with blue polka-dots jersey, because first placed Julian Alaphilippe wore the yellow jersey as leader of the general classification.

== Final standings ==
Legend
A yellow jersey	Denotes the winner of the general classification	A white with blue dots jersey	Denotes the leader of the points classification
A white with red dots jersey	Denotes the leader of the mountains classification	A white jersey classification	Denotes the winner of the young rider classification

=== General classification ===
Final general classification (1–10)
Rank	Rider	Team	Time
1	Julian Alaphilippe (FRA)	Quick-Step Floors	16h 33' 08"
2	Jan Tratnik (SLO)	CCC–Sprandi–Polkowice	+ 16"
3	Cesare Benedetti (ITA)	Bora–Hansgrohe	+ 22"
4	Ben Hermans (BEL)	Belgium (national)	+ 26"
5	Josef Černý (CZE)	Elkov–Author	+ 28"
6	Tobias Foss (NOR)	Uno-X Norwegian Development Team	+ 31"
7	Steff Cras (BEL)	Belgium (national)	+ 31"
8	Pieter Weening (NED)	Roompot–Nederlandse Loterij	+ 31"
9	Nick van der Lijke (NED)	Roompot–Nederlandse Loterij	+ 34"
10	Łukasz Owsian (POL)	CCC–Sprandi–Polkowice	+ 36"

=== Points classification ===
Final points classification (1–10)
Rank	Rider	Team	Points
1	Martin Haring (SVK)	Dukla Banská Bystrica	56
2	Matteo Pelucchi (ITA)	Bora–Hansgrohe	35
3	Fabio Jakobsen (NED)	Quick-Step Floors	35
4	Yves Lampaert (BEL)	Quick-Step Floors	32
5	Julian Alaphilippe (FRA)	Quick-Step Floors	30
6	Rüdiger Selig (GER)	Bora–Hansgrohe	28
7	Jan Tratnik (SLO)	CCC–Sprandi–Polkowice	25
8	Cesare Benedetti (ITA)	Bora–Hansgrohe	23
9	Christophe Laporte (FRA)	Cofidis	22
10	Zdeněk Štybar (CZE)	Quick-Step Floors	17

=== Mountains classification ===
Final mountains classification (1–10)
Rank	Rider	Team	Points
1	Giulio Ciccone (ITA)	Bardiani–CSF	87
2	Martin Haring (SVK)	Dukla Banská Bystrica	41
3	Patrik Tybor (SVK)	Dukla Banská Bystrica	30
4	Vitaliy Buts (UKR)	Team Hurom	22
5	Jan Bárta (CZE)	Elkov–Author	21
6	Aleksandr Vlasov (RUS)	Gazprom–RusVelo	17
7	Ben Hermans (BEL)	Belgium (national)	16
8	Niki Terpstra (NED)	Quick-Step Floors	15
9	Umberto Orsini (ITA)	Bardiani–CSF	15
10	Emanuel Piaskowy (POL)	Team Hurom	12

=== Under-23 rider classification ===
Final Under-23 classification (1–10)
Rank	Rider	Team	Time
1	Tobias Foss (NOR)	Uno-X Norwegian Development Team	16h 33' 39"
2	Steff Cras (BEL)	Belgium (national)	+ 0"
3	Attila Valter (HUN)	Pannon Cycling Team	+ 15"
4	Andreas Leknessund (NOR)	Uno-X Norwegian Development Team	+ 29"
5	Viktor Verschaeve (BEL)	Belgium (national)	+ 39"
6	Kevin Inkelaar (NED)	Roompot–Nederlandse Loterij	+ 42"
7	Márton Dina (HUN)	Pannon Cycling Team	+ 48"
8	Aleksandr Vlasov (RUS)	Gazprom–RusVelo	+ 52"
9	Jonas Rutsch (GER)	Germany (national)	+ 1' 50"
10	Johannes Schinnagel (GER)	Bora–Hansgrohe	+ 2' 18"

=== Team classification ===
Final team classification (1–10)
Rank	Team	Time
1	CCC–Sprandi–Polkowice	49h 41' 06"
2	Belgium (national)	+ 19"
3	Roompot–Nederlandse Loterij	+ 30"
4	Quick-Step Floors	+ 1' 34"
5	Uno-X Norwegian Development Team	+ 1' 34"
6	Elkov–Author	+ 1' 54"
7	Adria Mobil	+ 2' 03"
8	Gazprom–RusVelo	+ 2' 59"
9	Bora–Hansgrohe	+ 3' 53"
10	Bardiani–CSF	+ 5' 18"
