= 1995 UCI Road World Championships – Men's time trial =

Men's Individual Time Trial
1995 UCI Road World Championships
- Rainbow jersey

Race details
- Dates: 1995-10-04 in (Colombia) Duitama (COL)
- Stages: 1
- Distance: 43 km (26.72 mi)
- Winning time: 00h 55' 30"

Results
	Winner	Miguel Induráin (ESP)	(Spain)
	Second	Abraham Olano (ESP)	(Spain)
	Third	Uwe Peschel (GER)	(Germany)

The Men's Individual Time Trial at the 1995 World Cycling Championships was held on October 4, 1995, in Tunja / Duitama, Colombia, over a total of 64 cyclists took part in a 43 kilometer race. Four of which failed to finish.

== Final classification ==
Rank	Rider	Time
1st place, gold medalist(s)	Miguel Induráin (ESP)	0:55.30
2nd place, silver medalist(s)	Abraham Olano (ESP)	0:56.19
3rd place, bronze medalist(s)	Uwe Peschel (GER)	0:57.33
4.	Dubán Ramírez (COL)	0:58.42
5.	Igor Bonciukov (MDA)	0:59.03
6.	Erik Breukink (NED)	0:59.12
7.	Zenon Jaskuła (POL)	0:59.12
8.	Mike Engleman (USA)	0:59.21
9.	Maurizio Fondriest (ITA)	0:59.26
10.	Jan Karlsson (SWE)	0:59.44
11.	Brett Dennis (AUS)	1:00.07
12.	Thierry Marie (FRA)	1:00.07
13.	Artūras Kasputis (LTU)	1:00.08
14.	Andrea Chiurato (ITA)	1:00.14
15.	Steve Hegg (USA)	1:00.17
16.	Deane Rogers (AUS)	1:00.23
17.	Javier Zapata (COL)	1:00.33
18.	Rolf Aldag (GER)	1:00.50
19.	Peter Meinert Nielsen (DEN)	1:01.06
20.	Ruslan Ivanov (MDA)	1:01.07
21.	Graeme Obree (GBR)	1:01.16
22.	Cassio Freitas (BRA)	1:01.21
23.	Roland Green (CAN)	1:01.33
24.	Jesús Zárate (MEX)	1:01.43
25.	Miroslav Lipták (SVK)	1:01.55
26.	Robert Pintarič (SLO)	1:02.05
27.	Frans Maassen (NED)	1:02.07
28.	Philipp Buschor (SUI)	1:02.18
29.	Matthew Brick (NZL)	1:02.20
30.	Igor Prutskih (RUS)	1:02.27
31.	Dietmar Müller (AUT)	1:02.31
32.	Csaba Szekeres (HUN)	1:02.44
33.	Dimitri Sedun (RUS)	1:02.46
34.	Tomasz Brożyna (POL)	1:02.47
35.	Pascal Lance (FRA)	1:02.53
36.	Oleg Klevtsov (ARM)	1:03.17
37.	Jacques Landry (CAN)	1:03.18
38.	László Bodrogi (HUN)	1:03.30
39.	Philip Collins (IRL)	1:03.31
40.	Friedrich Berein (AUT)	1:03.58
41.	Allen Andersson (SWE)	1:04.14
42.	Romans Vainsteins (LAT)	1:04.35
43.	Serhiy Honchar (UKR)	1:04.56
44.	Takayuki Kakinoki (JPN)	1:05.22
45.	Georgios Portelanos (GRE)	1:06.41
46.	Gert van Vliet (ARU)	1:06.49
47.	Nico Mattan (BEL)	1:08.06
48.	Robert Nagy (SVK)	1:08.37
49.	Wong-Kam Po (HKG)	1:08.38
50.	Martin Du Plessis (NAM)	1:08.40
51.	Igor Patenko (BLR)	1:08.40
52.	Aleides Caballero (PAN)	1:12.47
53.	Dennis Brooks (CAY)	1:15.42
54.	Stefan Baraud (CAY)	1:15.47
55.	Eustace Dooke (LCA)	1:15.48
56.	Sylvester James (LCA)	1:17.55
57.	Jorge Heilbron (PAN)	1:18.26
58.	Cheong Wai-Chong (MAC)	1:19.38
59.	Juno Voltaire (HAI)	1:22.06
60.	Jean-Louis Serge (HAI)	1:24.32
—	Domingo González (MEX)	DNF
—	Kari Myyrylainen (FIN)	DNF
—	Kang Byung-Soo (KOR)	DNF
—	Brian Holm (DEN)	DNF

== See also ==
- Cycling at the 1996 Summer Olympics – Men's time trial
