= Marcus Christie =

Marcus Christie may refer to:

- Marcus Christie (cyclist) (born 1991), Irish racing cyclist
- Marcus Christie (EastEnders), fictional character
