= Pavol Polievka =

Slovak bicycle racer

Personal information
- Born: 6 January 1969 (age 57) Czechoslovakia

Cycling career
- Sport: Cycling
- Current team: Retired
- Discipline: Road
- Role: Rider

Amateur team
- 2011–2012: Trek KCK Oslany

Professional team
- 2006–2011: Dukla Trenčín

Pavol Polievka (born 6 January 1969) is a Slovak former cyclist.

== Major results ==
2008
3rd Tour of Libya
2009
2nd Time trial, National Road Championships
2010
2nd Time trial, National Road Championships
3rd Grand Prix Hydraulika Mikolasek
2011
1st Time trial, National Road Championships
2012
3rd Overall Grand Prix Chantal Biya

1st Stage 4
