= Adrián Babič =

Slovak cyclist (1996–2021)

Personal information
- Born: 14 November 1996
- Died: 26 May 2021 (aged 24)

Cycling career
- Sport: Cycling
- Discipline: Road
- Role: Rider

Amateur teams
- 2015: Slovakia2015
- 2016–2021: Team Firefly

Adrián Babič (14 November 1996 – 26 May 2021) was a Slovak road racing cyclist.

He became the national under-23 time trial champion in 2017, finishing second in 2018. He won the bronze medal at the 2017 Slovak National Time Trial Championships. He competed at the 2018 UCI Road World Championships in the under-23 time trial event. Babič was also Slovakia's junior champion in winter triathlon and the winner of the Slovak World Cycling Cup of 2019.

Babič died on 26 May 2021 after he was struck by a vehicle while training. He was 24 years old.

== Major results ==
2017
1st Time trial, National Under-23 Road Championships
3rd Time trial, National Road Championships
2018
2nd Time trial, National Under-23 Road Championships
2019
5th Road race, National Road Championships

== See also ==
- List of racing cyclists and pacemakers with a cycling-related death
