= Ronald Kuba =

Slovak cyclist

Personal information
- Born: 14 October 1994 (age 32)

Cycling career
- Sport: Cycling
- Current team: Brigetio KSE
- Discipline: Road
- Role: Rider
- Rider type: Time trialist

Amateur team
- 2019–: Brigetio KSE

Ronald Kuba (born 14 October 1994) is a Slovak racing cyclist. In June 2021, he won the Slovak National Time Trial Championships. In September 2021, he rode in the men's time trial event at the 2021 UCI Road World Championships.

== Major results ==
2019
6th Time trial, National Road Championships
2020
3rd Time trial, National Road Championships
2021
1st Time trial, National Road Championships
