= 2000 Tirreno–Adriatico =

Race details
- Dates: 8–15 March 2000
- Stages: 8
- Distance: 1,242 km (771.7 mi)
- Winning time: 33h 17' 36"

Results
Jersey awarded to the overall winner	Winner	Abraham Olano (ESP)	(ONCE–Deutsche Bank)
	Second	Jan Hruška (CZE)	(Vitalicio Seguros)
	Third	Juan Carlos Domínguez (ESP)	(Vitalicio Seguros)

The 2000 Tirreno–Adriatico was the 35th edition of the Tirreno–Adriatico cycle race and was held from 8 March to 15 March 2000. The race started in Sorrento and finished in San Benedetto del Tronto. The race was won by Abraham Olano of the ONCE team.

== Teams ==
Twenty-two teams participated in the race:

- Mapei–Quick-Step
- Amica Chips–Tacconi Sport
- Cantina Tollo–Regain
- Cofidis
- Crédit Agricole
- Farm Frites
- Fassa Bortolo
- Festina
- Française des Jeux
- Lampre–Daikin
- Linda McCartney Foods
- Liquigas–Pata
- Mercatone Uno–Albacom
- Mobilvetta Design–Rossin
- Ceramica Panaria–Gaerne
- Rabobank
- Saeco–Valli & Valli
- Team Telekom
- Team Polti
- Vini Caldirola–Sidermec
- Vitalicio Seguros
- ONCE–Deutsche Bank

== Route ==
Stage characteristics and winners
Stage	Date	Course	Distance	Type	Winner
1	8 March	Sorrento to Sorrento	131 km (81 mi)		Óscar Freire (ESP)
2	9 March	Sorrento to Aversa	189 km (117 mi)		Ján Svorada (CZE)
3	10 March	Aversa to Santuario di Castelpetroso	160 km (99 mi)		Laurent Jalabert (FRA)
4	11 March	Isernia to Luco dei Marsi	207 km (129 mi)		Erik Zabel (GER)
5	12 March	Ascoli Piceno to Ascoli Piceno	26.5 km (16.5 mi)	Individual time trial	Abraham Olano (ESP)
6	13 March	Montegranaro to Monte San Giusto	149 km (93 mi)		Óscar Freire (ESP)
7	14 March	Teramo to Torricella Sicura	214 km (133 mi)		Michael Boogerd (NED)
8	15 March	San Benedetto del Tronto to San Benedetto del Tronto	166 km (103 mi)		Romāns Vainšteins (LAT)

== General classification ==
Final general classification

Rank	Rider	Team	Time
1	Abraham Olano (ESP)	ONCE–Deutsche Bank	33h 17' 36"
2	Jan Hruška (CZE)	Vitalicio Seguros	+ 10"
3	Juan Carlos Domínguez (ESP)	Vitalicio Seguros	+ 18"
4	Laurent Jalabert (FRA)	ONCE–Deutsche Bank	+ 38"
5	Marco Serpellini (ITA)	Lampre–Daikin	+ 46"
6	Jens Voigt (GER)	Crédit Agricole	+ 52"
7	Marc Wauters (BEL)	Rabobank	+ 55"
8	David Plaza (ESP)	Festina	+ 1' 02"
9	Gabriele Colombo (ITA)	Cantina Tollo–Regain	+ 1' 04"
10	Romāns Vainšteins (LAT)	Vini Caldirola–Sidermec	+ 1' 23"
