= Martin Haring =

Slovak bicycle racer (born 1986)

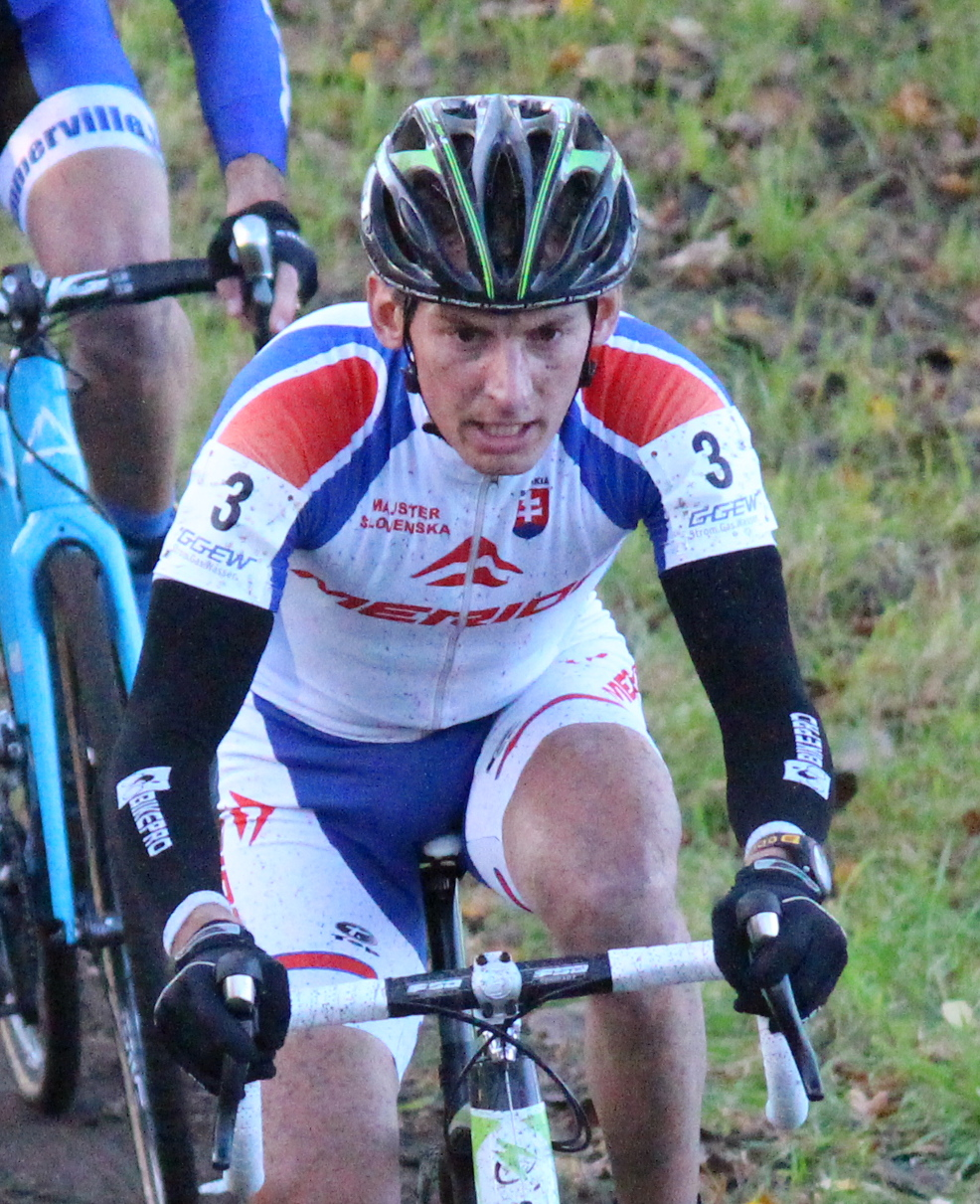

Personal information
- Full name: Martin Haring
- Born: 24 December 1986 (age 39) Zvolen, Czechoslovakia

Cycling career
- Sport: Cycling
- Disciplines: Cyclo-cross; Mountain biking; Road
- Role: Rider

Professional teams
- 2014–2015: CK Banská Bystrica
- 2016–2022: Dukla Banská Bystrica
- 2023: RRK Group–Pierre Baguette–Benzinol

Martin Haring (born 24 December 1986) is a Slovak cyclo-cross, road, and cross-country cyclist, who last rode for UCI Continental team RRK Group–Pierre Baguette–Benzinol. He represented his nation in the men's elite event at the 2016 UCI Cyclo-cross World Championships in Heusden-Zolder.

== Major results ==
=== Road ===
2007
7th Grand Prix Bradlo
2009
5th Overall Tour du Cameroun
2012
1st Stage 3 Sibiu Cycling Tour
2015
7th Overall Tour du Cameroun

1st Mountains classification

2017
1st National Hill Climb Championships
4th Overall Tour du Cameroun
5th Overall Gemenc Grand Prix
2018
1st Points classification Okolo Slovenska
2nd Overall Tour du Cameroun

1st Stage 4

3rd Time trial, National Road Championships
2020
1st Overall Tour de Serbie
2nd Time trial, National Road Championships
7th Overall Tour of Bulgaria
10th Overall Tour of Szeklerland
2021
4th Time trial, National Road Championships
9th Overall Tour of Bulgaria
9th Grand Prix Gündoğmuş

=== Cyclo-cross ===
2007–2008
2nd National Under-23 Championships
2011–2012
2nd National Championships
2012–2013
1st National Championships
3rd Cyclo-cross International Podbrezova
2013–2014
1st National Championships
1st Cyclo-cross International Podbrezová
1st Tage des Querfeldeinsports
3rd Ziklokross Igorre
2014–2015
1st National Championships
1st CX Marikovská Dolina
2015–2016
1st National Championships
1st Int. Radquerfeldein GP Lambach
3rd Internationales Radquer Steinmaur
3rd Cyclo-cross International Podbrezova
2016–2017
1st National Championships
Toi Toi Cup

2nd Mladá Boleslav

2017–2018
1st National Championships
Slovensky pohar v cyklokrose

1st GP Kosice
1st GP Trnava
1st GP Dolná Krupa
3rd GP Rakova
3rd GP Poprad

1st Tage des Querfeldeinsports
2nd Cyclocross International Podbrezová
Toi Toi Cup

2nd Hlinsko

2018–2019
3rd National Championships
3rd Grand Prix Topoľčianky
2019–2020
2nd National Championships
2021–2022
3rd National Championships
2022–2023
1st National Championships
3rd Topolcianky 2

=== MTB ===
2012
2nd National XCO Championships
2013
1st National XCM Championships
2nd National XCO Championships
2014
1st National XCM Championships
2017
1st National XCO Championships
1st National XCM Championships
2018
1st National XCO Championships
2019
1st National XCO Championships
2020
1st National XCO Championships
