= 1995 UCI Road World Championships – Men's road race =

Men's Individual Road Race
1995 UCI Road World Championships
- Rainbow jersey

Race details
- Dates: 8 October 1995
- Stages: 1
- Distance: 265.5 km (165.0 mi)
- Winning time: 7h 09' 55"

Results
	Winner	Abraham Olano (ESP)	(Spain)
	Second	Miguel Induráin (ESP)	(Spain)
	Third	Marco Pantani (ITA)	(Italy)

The men's road race at the 1995 UCI Road World Championships was the 62nd edition of the event. The race took place on Sunday 8 October 1995 in Duitama, Colombia. The race was won by Abraham Olano of Spain.

== Final classification ==
General classification (1–20)

Rank	Rider	Time
1st place, gold medalist(s)	Abraham Olano (ESP)	7h 09' 55"
2nd place, silver medalist(s)	Miguel Induráin (ESP)	+ 35"
3rd place, bronze medalist(s)	Marco Pantani (ITA)	+ 35"
4	Mauro Gianetti (SUI)	+ 35"
5	Pascal Richard (SUI)	+ 53"
6	Richard Virenque (FRA)	+ 1' 31"
7	Dimitri Konyshev (RUS)	+ 1' 53"
8	Oliverio Rincón (COL)	+ 1' 53"
9	Rolf Sørensen (DEN)	+ 1' 53"
10	Felice Puttini (SUI)	+ 1' 53"
11	Israel Ochoa (COL)	+ 3' 08"
12	Francesco Casagrande (ITA)	+ 3' 49"
13	José María Jiménez (ESP)	+ 6' 59"
14	Fernando Escartín (ESP)	+ 8' 52"
15	José González (COL)	+ 9' 22"
16	Oscar Pelliccioli (ITA)	+ 13' 15"
17	Paolo Lanfranchi (ITA)	s.t.
18	Zenon Jaskuła (POL)	+ 15' 24"
19	Miguel Arroyo (MEX)	+ 37' 55"
20	Andrew Hampsten (USA)	s.t.
