= ConBici =

- Coordinator for the Defense of the Bicycle
- Coordinadora en defensa de la bici
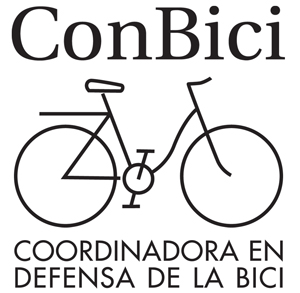
- Formation: 1990
- Type: Nonprofit
- Fields: Urban cycling, bicycle touring
- Affiliations: European Cyclists' Federation
- Website: https://conbici.org/

ConBici, Coordinator for the Defense of the Bicycle, is a Spanish organization that brings together dozens of associations and groups dedicated to promoting and defending the use of the bicycle. Its main objective is to encourage cycling as a safe, sustainable, and everyday mode of transport, as well as to promote public policies that support active mobility and cyclist safety. The organization acts as a coordinator of the cycling movement in Spain and as a representative in dialogue with public administrations and other organizations.

ConBici was established in 1990, in a context of growing interest in active and sustainable mobility and urban cycling in Spain. It was created to coordinate different local cycling associations that were already working to defend the bicycle, with the aim of joining efforts, sharing experiences, and increasing their capacity to influence mobility policies and urban planning.

In addition to its role of representation and coordination, ConBici carries out various activities and projects to promote cycling culture. These include the organization of congresses, cycle touring gatherings, and collaboration in educational and research initiatives related to sustainable mobility.

== See also ==
- European Cyclists' Federation
