= 1998 UCI Road World Championships – Men's time trial =

Men's Individual Time Trial
1998 UCI Road World Championships
- Rainbow jersey

Race details
- Dates: October 8 in Valkenburg
- Stages: 1
- Distance: 43.5 km (27.03 mi)
- Winning time: 54' 32"

Medalists
	Gold	Abraham Olano (ESP)	(Spain)
	Silver	Melcior Mauri (ESP)	(Spain)
	Bronze	Serhiy Honchar (UKR)	(Ukraine)

The men's time trial at the 1998 UCI Road World Championships was held on Thursday October 8, 1998, from Maastricht to Vilt, within the commune of Valkenburg aan de Geul. The race had a total distance of 43.5 kilometres. There were a total number of 46 competitors, with three disqualifications and one non-starters.

== Final classification ==
Rank	Rider	8.4 km	27.6 km	36.1 km	43.5 km	Behind	Speed (km/h)
1st place, gold medalist(s)	Abraham Olano (ESP)	10:59.08	34:51.09	45:17.02	54:32.01		48.05
2nd place, silver medalist(s)	Melcior Mauri (ESP)	11:02.05	34:59.08	45:43.06	55:09.06	0.37	47.38
3rd place, bronze medalist(s)	Serhiy Honchar (UKR)	11:01.08	35:03.01	45:46.01	55:19.08	0.47	47.29
4.	Lance Armstrong (USA)	11:06.03	35:04.02	45:44.00	55:28.09	0.56	47.21
5.	Uwe Peschel (GER)	10:57.08	35:07.07	45:57.07	55:39.03	1.07	47.12
6.	Beat Zberg (SUI)	11:10.05	35:22.06	46:02.01	55:43.06	1.11	47.09
7.	Jonathan Vaughters (USA)	11:03.07	35:04.06	45:53.02	55:45.03	1.13	47.07
8.	Michael Sandstød (DEN)	11:03.05	35:38.08	46:21.08	56:06.05	1.34	46.56
9.	Viatcheslav Ekimov (RUS)	11:11.02	35:37.05	46:27.06	56:20.00	1.47	46.44
10.	Erik Dekker (NED)	11:15.09	35:50.06	46:30.03	56:21.05	1.49	46.43
11.	Chris Boardman (GBR)	11:11.09	35:44.02	46:46.05	56:22.05	1.50	46.42
12.	Martin Hvastija (SLO)	11:03.09	35:51.00	46:44.09	56:26.06	1.54	46.39
13.	Marco Velo (ITA)	11:03.03	35:52.04	46:39.01	56:27.06	1.55	46.38
14.	Peter Meinert Nielsen (DEN)	11:15.05	35:47.07	46:39.05	56:29.02	1.57	46.37
15.	Fabio Malberti (ITA)	11:12.05	35:49.01	46:35.03	56:29.07	1.57	46.37
16.	Sergiy Matveyev (UKR)	11:13.08	36:11.08	46:55.09	56:59.06	2.27	46.12
17.	Branko Filip (SLO)	11:35.02	36:24.00	47:00.00	57:00.06	2.28	45.79
18.	Francisque Teyssier (FRA)	11:18.04	35:59.08	46:59.06	57:01.09	2.29	45.78
19.	Lauri Aus (EST)	11:14.08	36:10.04	47:19.02	57:02.01	2.30	45.77
20.	Bradley McGee (AUS)	11:22.07	36:25.07	47:03.01	57:04.02	2.32	45.76
21.	Grischa Niermann (GER)	11:16.02	36:17.04	47:13.02	57:10.01	2.38	45.71
22.	Andrey Mizurov (KAZ)	11:23.05	36:23.07	47:22.00	57:22.06	2.50	45.61
23.	Alexander Vinokourov (KAZ)	11:19.02	36:33.09	47:34.08	57:30.07	2.58	45.55
24.	Milan Kadlec (CZE)	11:21.05	36:33.04	47:40.05	57:38.00	3.05	45.49
25.	Servais Knaven (NED)	11:24.09	36:49.05	47:54.07	58:03.02	3.31	44.98
26.	Marc Streel (BEL)	11:34.03	36:52.05	47:55.00	58:06.01	3.34	44.95
27.	Gilles Maignan (FRA)	11:39.02	36:59.07	48:06.03	58:15.00	3.42	44.88
28.	Stuart Dangerfield (GBR)	11:39.04	37:07.05	48:11.07	58:16.08	3.44	44.88
29.	Dainis Ozols (LAT)	11:30.07	37:02.00	48:18.08	58:41.08	4.09	44.68
30.	Dariusz Baranowski (POL)	11:35.02	37:01.08	48:27.05	58:43.03	4.11	44.67
31.	Jan Valach (SVK)	11:32.03	37:22.03	48:36.06	58:58.02	4.26	44.55
32.	José Azevedo (POR)	11:44.09	37:50.04	48:57.00	59:06.09	4.34	44.19
33.	Igor Bonciucov (MDA)	11:38.02	37:56.03	49:14.09	59:24.06	4.52	44.06
34.	Michael Andersson (SWE)	11:47.07	37:20.02	48:39.00	59:31.08	4.59	44.01
35.	Piotr Przydział (POL)	11:53.02	38:23.04	49:12.07	59:34.04	5.02	43.98
36.	Amr Elnady (EGY)	12:05.07	38:55.02	50:21.08	61:01.00	6.28	42.78
37.	Vasilis Anastopoulos (GRE)	12:02.03	39:06.05	50:31.06	61:06.00	6.33	42.74
38.	Bruno Boscardin (SUI)	11:46.02	38:38.06	50:29.05	61:34.00	7.01	42.55
39.	Miroslav Lipták (SVK)	12:20.09	39:26.06	51:11.09	62:01.00	7.28	42.09
40.	Tomokazu Fujino (JPN)	12:23.09	39:35.01	51:12.02	62:05.00	7.32	42.06
41.	Benjamin Loberant (ISR)	12:18.06	39:53.08	51:39.09	62:34.00	8.01	41.87
42.	Kyoshi Miura (JPN)	12:47.00	40:59.08	52:46.08	63:56.00	9.23	41.06
DNF	Ondrej Sosenka (CZE)						
DSQ	Ruslan Ivanov (MDA)						
DSQ	Joaquim Andrade (POR)						
DSQ	Serguei Ivanov (RUS)						
DNS	Martin Rittsel (SWE)						
