= Cycling at the 1996 Summer Olympics – Men's time trial =

Cycling at the Olympics

Men's road time trial at the Games of the XXVI Olympiad
- Venues: Cycling Road Course
- Competitors: 38 from 23 nations
- Winning time: 1:04:05

Medalists
| 1st place, gold medalist(s) | | Miguel Induráin | Spain |
| 2nd place, silver medalist(s) | | Abraham Olano | Spain |
| 3rd place, bronze medalist(s) | | Chris Boardman | Great Britain |

These are the official results of the men's individual time trial at the 1996 Summer Olympics in Atlanta. There were a total number of 40 participants, with two non-starters and one non-finisher, in this inaugural Olympic event over 52 kilometres, held on Saturday August 3, 1996.

== Final classification ==
| Rank | Cyclist (NOC) | Time |
|---|---|---|
| 1st place, gold medalist(s) | Miguel Induráin (ESP) | 1:04:05 |
| 2nd place, silver medalist(s) | Abraham Olano (ESP) | 1:04:17 |
| 3rd place, bronze medalist(s) | Chris Boardman (GBR) | 1:04:36 |
| 4. | Maurizio Fondriest (ITA) | 1:05:01 |
| 5. | Tony Rominger (SUI) | 1:06:05 |
| 6. | Lance Armstrong (USA) | 1:06:28 |
| 7. | Alex Zülle (SUI) | 1:06:33 |
| 8. | Patrick Jonker (AUS) | 1:06:54 |
| 9. | Dariusz Baranowski (POL) | 1:07:08 |
| 10. | Michael Rich (GER) | 1:07:08 |
| 11. | Erik Dekker (NED) | 1:07:08 |
| 12. | Uwe Peschel (GER) | 1:07:33 |
| 13. | Laurent Jalabert (FRA) | 1:07:34 |
| 14. | Bjarne Riis (DEN) | 1:07:47 |
| 15. | Evgeni Berzin (RUS) | 1:07:53 |
| 16. | Steve Hegg (USA) | 1:08:29 |
| 17. | Erik Breukink (NED) | 1:08:33 |
| 18. | Jan Karlsson (SWE) | 1:08:52 |
| 19. | Francesco Casagrande (ITA) | 1:09:18 |
| 20. | Laurent Brochard (FRA) | 1:09:22 |
| 21. | Artūras Kasputis (LTU) | 1:07:47 |
| 22. | Tomasz Brożyna (POL) | 1:09:48 |
| 23. | Stephen Hodge (AUS) | 1:09:59 |
| 24. | Johan Bruyneel (BEL) | 1:10:12 |
| 25. | Anton Villatoro (GUA) | 1:10:34 |
| 26. | Eric Wohlberg (CAN) | 1:10:36 |
| 27. | Ruslan Ivanov (MDA) | 1:10:55 |
| 28. | Remigijus Lupeikis (LTU) | 1:11:03 |
| 29. | Dubán Ramírez (COL) | 1:11:18 |
| 30. | Jesús Zárate (MEX) | 1:11:42 |
| 31. | Miroslav Lipták (SVK) | 1:12:28 |
| 32. | Robert Pintarič (SLO) | 1:12:35 |
| 33. | Igor Bonciukov (MDA) | 1:12:48 |
| 34. | Milan Dvorščík (SVK) | 1:12:54 |
| 35. | Hernandes Quadri (BRA) | 1:14:12 |
| 36. | Valdir Lermen (BRA) | 1:14:48 |
| 37. | Javier Zapata (COL) | 1:15:09 |
| — | Michael Andersson (SWE) | DNF |
| — | Pavel Tonkov (RUS) | DNS |
| — | Rolf Sørensen (DEN) | DNS |

== See also ==
- 1995 UCI Road World Championships – Men's Time Trial

== Sources ==
- Official Report
