= Michael Bresciani =

Italian cyclist (born 1994)

Personal information
- Born: 20 December 1994 (age 31) Desenzano del Garda, Italy

Cycling career
- Sport: Cycling
- Current team: Retired
- Discipline: Road
- Role: Rider
- Rider type: Sprinter

Amateur teams
- 2013: Marchiol–Emisfero–Site
- 2014: General Store Bottoli Zardini
- 2016–2017: Zalf–Euromobil–Désirée–Fior

Professional teams
- 2015: Roth–Škoda
- 2017–2019: Bardiani–CSF
- 2020: D'Amico–UM Tools

Michael Bresciani (born 20 December 1994 in Desenzano del Garda) is an Italian former professional cyclist, who rode professionally in 2015 and from 2017 to 2020, for the Roth–Škoda, Bardiani–CSF and D'Amico–UM Tools teams.

In October 2017 it was revealed that Bresciani had tested positive for furosemide, a diuretic which can be used as a masking agent, at the Italian National Road Race Championships in June of that year: he claimed that this was due to his food being accidentally contaminated by his mother, who takes furosemide as a medication. He served a backdated two-month suspension.

== Major results ==
2015
5th Paris–Chauny
2016
9th Trofeo Città di San Vendemiano
2017
3rd Circuito del Porto
