= Marcus Christie (cyclist) =

Irish cyclist (born 1991)

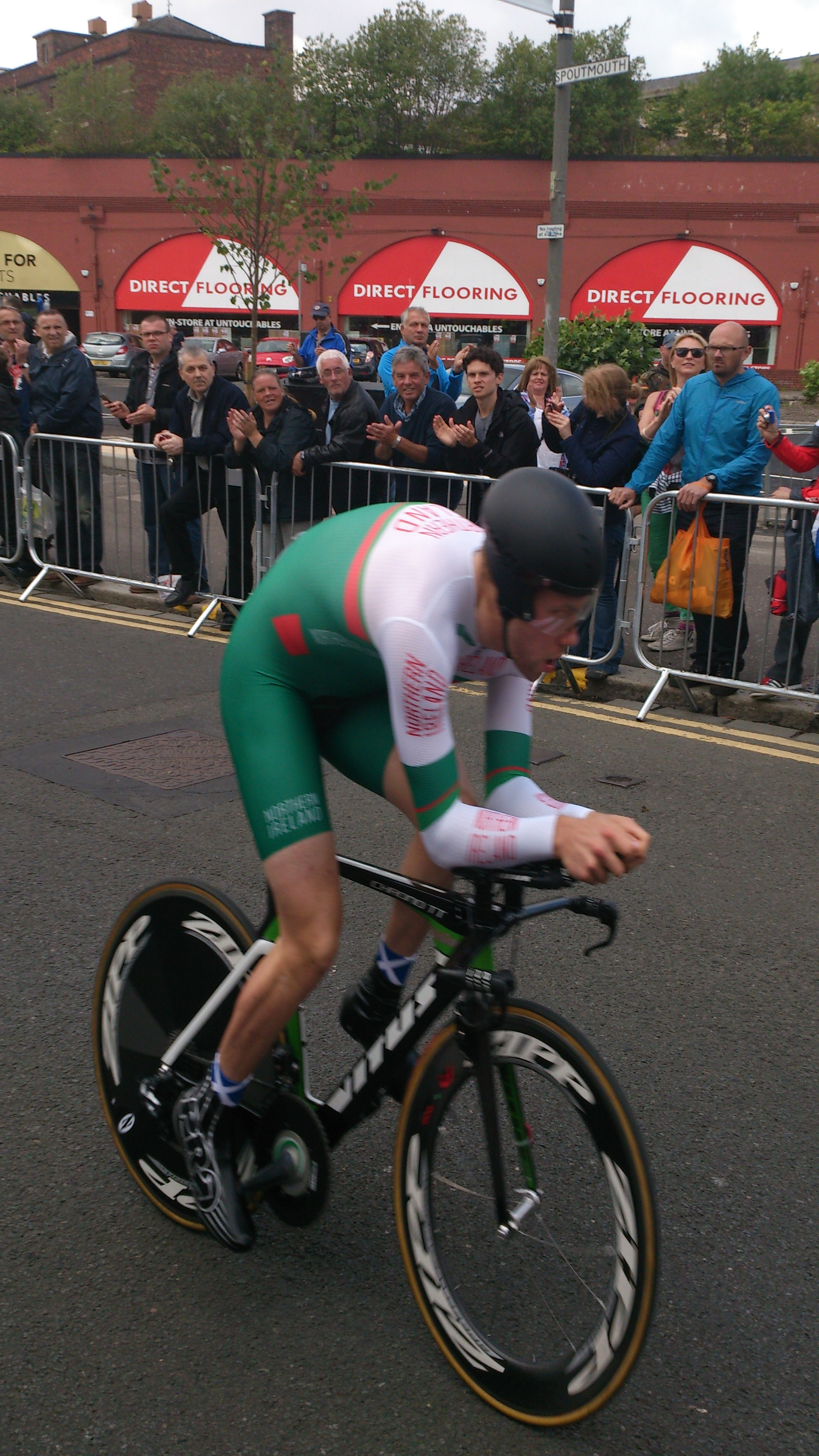
- Christie at the 2014 Commonwealth Games

Personal information
- Born: 18 January 1991 (age 35) Derry, Northern Ireland

Cycling career
- Sport: Cycling
- Discipline: Road
- Role: Rider
- Rider type: Time trialist

Amateur teams
- 2013: FOY Foyle CC
- 2015: Bissell–ABG–Giant
- 2016: Team Asea–Wheelworx
- 2017: Ireland17
- 2018: Black Rose Racing
- 2021: Performance SBR
- 2022–2023: Banbridge CC
- 2023–2024: CC Isle of Man

Professional team
- 2014: An Post–Chain Reaction

Marcus Christie (born 18 January 1991) is an Irish racing cyclist. He competed in the time trial at the 2021 UCI Road World Championships.

== Major results ==
2008
2nd Time trial, National Junior Road Championships
2009
National Junior Road Championships

1st Time trial
2nd Road race

2010
2nd Time trial, National Under-23 Road Championships
5th Time trial, National Road Championships
2013
3rd Time trial, National Under-23 Road Championships
2014
1st Stage 2 Tour of the North
2016
1st Stage 3 Tour of Ulster
6th Chrono Champenois
2017
3rd Time trial, National Road Championships
2018
2nd Time trial, National Road Championships
7th Time trial, Commonwealth Games
2020
4th Time trial, National Road Championships
