= Cycling in Madrid =

Transport by bicycle in Madrid, Spain

The city of Madrid has been increasing in the last years its network of bicycle paths. In 2016, there were 195 km of cycling routes. The former city council had been planning to build 400 km more for the year 2024 despite a very vocal opposition to the construction of segregated infrastructure by a significant part of the local cycling community. However now with the new right wing mayor elected in 2019 the city is set to be the only capital in the world where bicycle lanes are being removed again.

== Cycling by-laws ==
Madrid's cycling law was approved by the council of Madrid 5 October 2018. This law introduced several changes in all the city of Madrid, some of them modifying the previous status of the bicycle. The most important changes were:

This traffic sign marks the start of a living street in Spain.

The signal R-407, because of being circle shaped and blue, can mislead to think that the bicycleway is mandatory. Because of that, the signal S-35 was created.
- Bicyclists must ride in the middle of the lane. Before, bicyclists may ride in the middle of the lane.
- Bicyclists are allowed to travel in the opposite direction of the other traffic in living streets.
- Bicyclists may use whichever lane on the road they want, although the rightest one is preferred.
- Bicyclists are not allowed to use bus lanes, unless there are explicit signs to do so. In addition, cyclists must ride on the left side of the bus lane. Note that in Madrid, taxis and motorcycles are allowed to drive on all bus lanes, except motorcycles on the la Castellana bus lane.
- Two bicycles may ride parallel in the same lane, unless this behaviour places in danger another cyclists or in bus lanes authorized to cyclists.
- It is not mandatory that cyclists ride through bicycle ways, unless it exists a mandatory cycleway sign.
- It is forbidden to ride on the pavement, on pedestrian streets and on pedestrian zones.
- Turn on red is allowed to bicycles if there is a traffic sign allowing that.

== Infrastructure ==
In Spain's Spanish, all kind of bicycle infrastructure segregated from cars are called informally carril bici, which means bicycle lane. The Madrid's sustainable mobility law defines 8 types of bicycle ways.

Nevertheless, other argue that there are up to 16 types of bikeways in Madrid.

=== Shared lanes ===
Car-shared lanes are lanes marked with shared-lane markings or sharrows. In Spanish there are called ciclocarril. This kind of infrastructure is marked with the drawing of a bicycle on the pavement and two "corporal" arrows (chevrons) that spans all the width of the lane. This is by far the most usual kind of infrastructure that can be found in Madrid and the defining character of cycling in the city. This lane has a speed limit of 30 km/h (19 mph) and is marked on the road, except in one lane streets, because in Madrid street with only one lane in a direction are de facto limited to 30 km/h (19 mph).

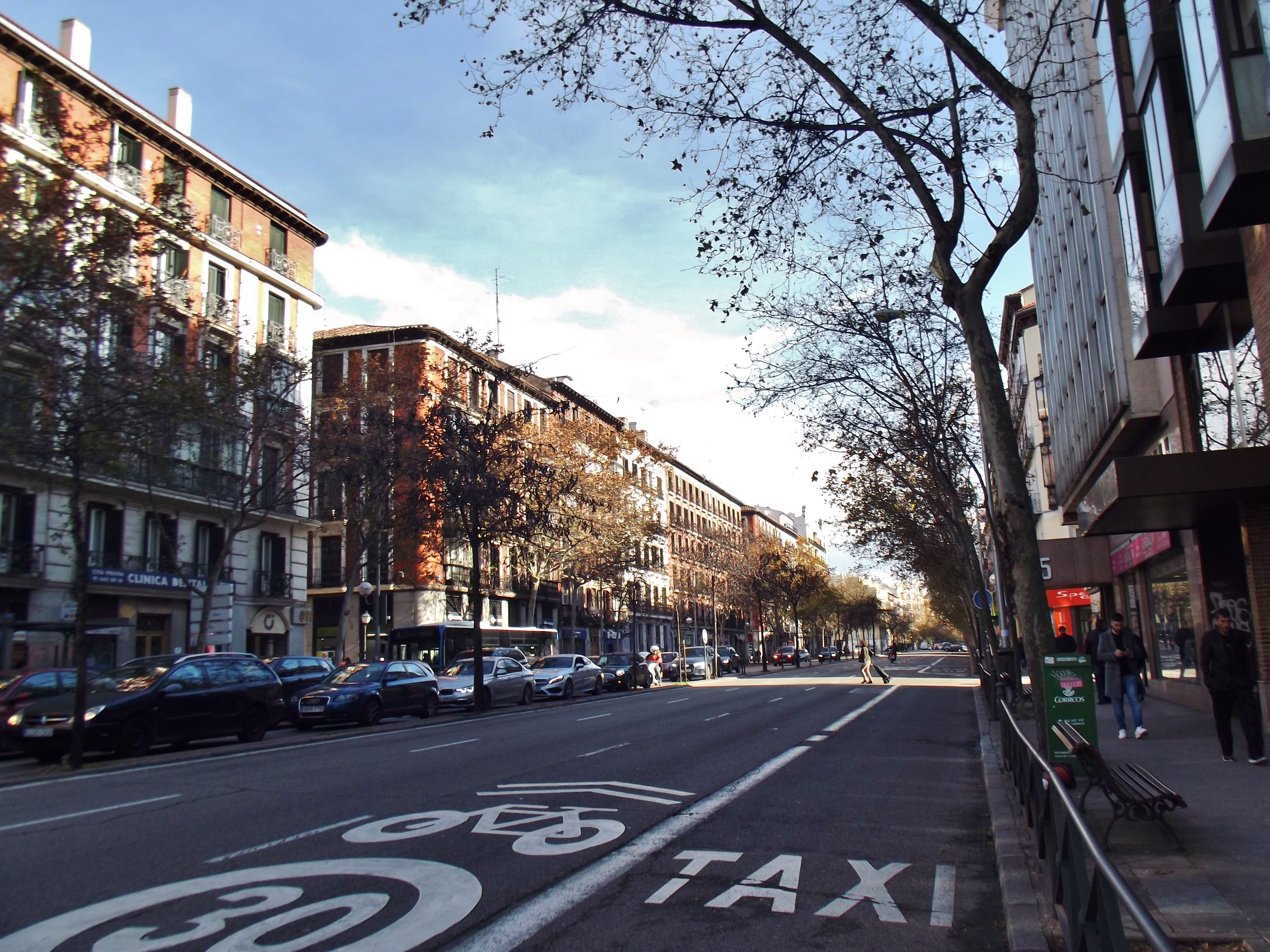
This ancient photo of Carranza Street is an example of car-shared lane (see in the middle lane the bicycle sign). Here is actually a bicycle lane between the bus lane and the other lanes

=== Sidewalk cycle-path ===
This is a bicycle path at the same level of the sidewalk. In Spanish is called acera-bici. This means that the segregation between pedestrians and cyclists doesn't exist or there is a difference of less than 3 cm (1.2 in) between the height of the cycleway and the pavement. In this kind of infrastructure, cyclists must yield to pedestrians when crossing transversely the cycleway. There is a speed limit of 10 km/h (6.2 mph) to cyclist. Examples of sidewalk cycle-paths can be found in O'Donnell Street or Serrano Street.

=== Bicycle lane ===
This is a lane of the road that can be only used by bicycles. In Spanish is called carril-bici. It can have rumble strips as lane line. Examples of this type of infrastructure can be found at Toledo Street, Alcalá Street, Mayor Street, Oporto Avenue or Mayorazgo Avenue. There are also some bicycle lanes that run between a bus lane and other lanes, as in Carranza Street, Atocha Street or Gran Vía.

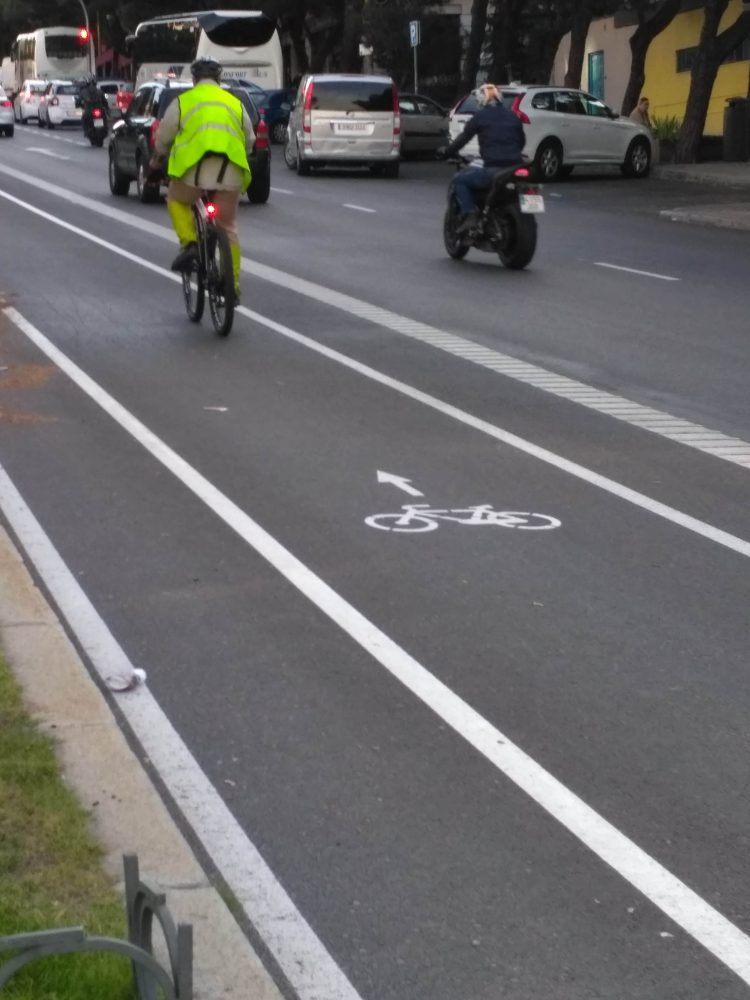
Bike lane in Toledo Street. It is segregated from the roadway by a white line.

=== Protected bicycle lane ===
This is also a lane of the road than can be only used by bicycle, but is protected with parked vehicles, bollards, kerbs or armadillos. It is called carril-bici protegido in Spanish. This bicycle infrastructure can be found in Santa Engracia Street, Camino de los Vinateros, Chopera Promenade or Francisco Largo Caballero Street.

=== Shared-use paths ===
Shared-use paths, which are calle senda-bici in Spanish, are ways for pedestrians and cycles that run through open spaces, parks, gardens or forests, separated from road with motorized traffic. In those paths pedestrians have always priority and cyclists have a speed limit of 20 km/h (12 mph). Usually, if not marked by a sign, all parks with paved paths of more than 3 metres (9 feet 10 inches) are considered shared use paths. If there are a lot of crowding and no separation between bicycles and pedestrians, maximum speed will be 5 km/h (3.1 mph). In forest zones and suburban parks, bicycles can ride through inner paths.

The most important shared-use path is Madrid Río, a park located in the banks of the Manzanares River and opened in 2011.

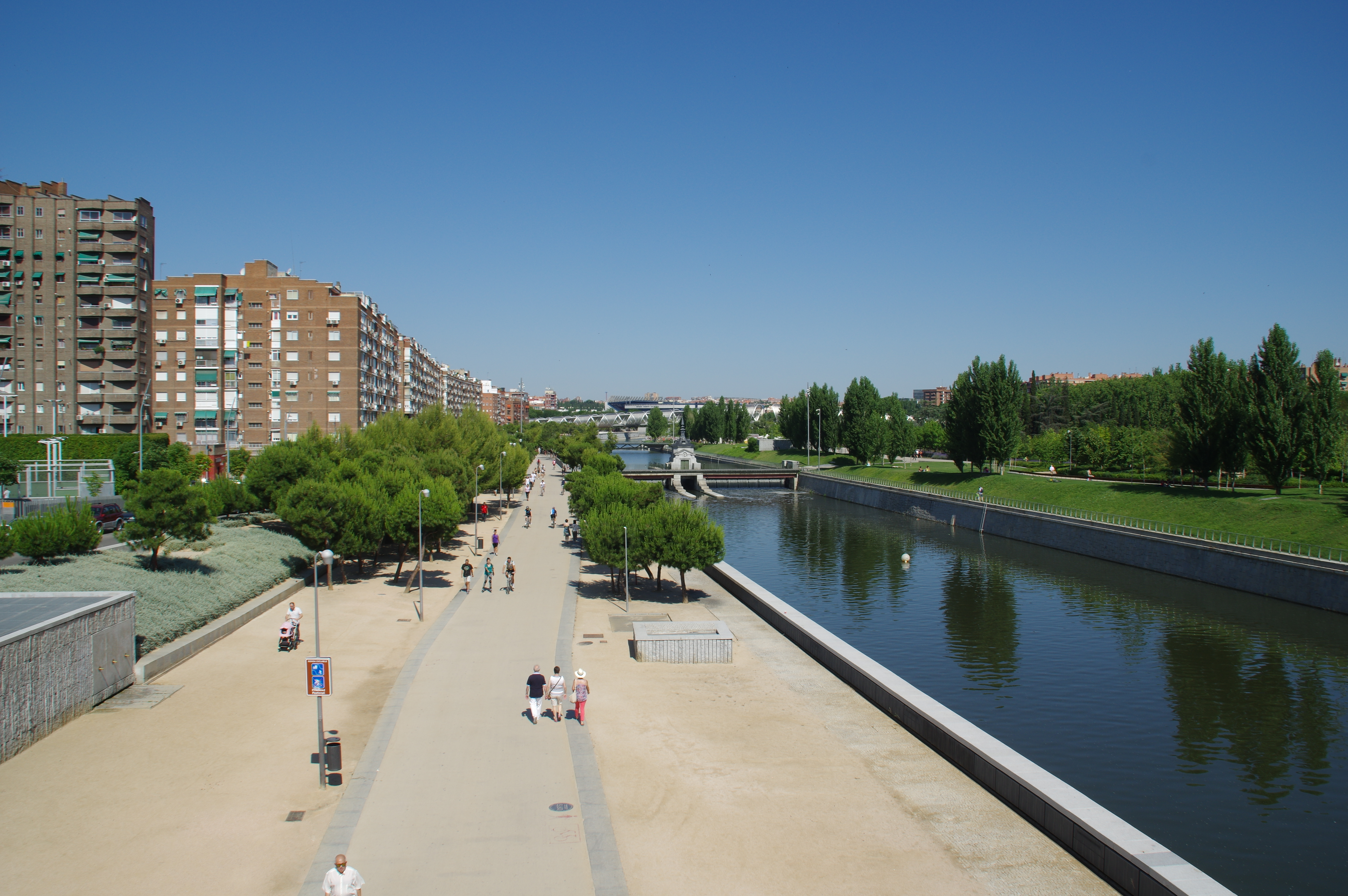
Madrid Río in 2015. In the centre, the shared use path can be seen

=== Cycle street ===
A cycle street is a street exclusive or preferential for bicycles in both ways. If other vehicles can access to this street, they must be explicitly authorized by a signal. As of 2019, the only cycle street in Madrid is at Puerta del Sol.

=== Bicycle path ===
A bicycle path are a cycleway that has its own platform, segregated both from the road and the pavement. This is called in Spanish pista bici. This segregations must be accomplished by a 3 cm (1.2 in) difference in height between the pavement and the cycleway (the law doesn't say anything about the difference in height between the road and the cycleway) or by a continuous segregation. Some examples of bicycle paths are in some sections of the Complutense Avenue, in some sections of Anillo Verde Ciclista and in the Juan Antonio Vallejo-Nájera Botas Promenade.

=== Advanced stop lights ===
Advances stop line are road markings near junction lights with the pictogram of a bicycle and a motorbike. Both cyclists and motorcyclists may use it. Advanced stop lines in Madrid doesn't have a feeder lane, so cyclists have to filter through cars in order to arrive there. However, if there is a bus lane, it is allowed to cyclists to use it to arrive at the front.

== BiciMAD ==
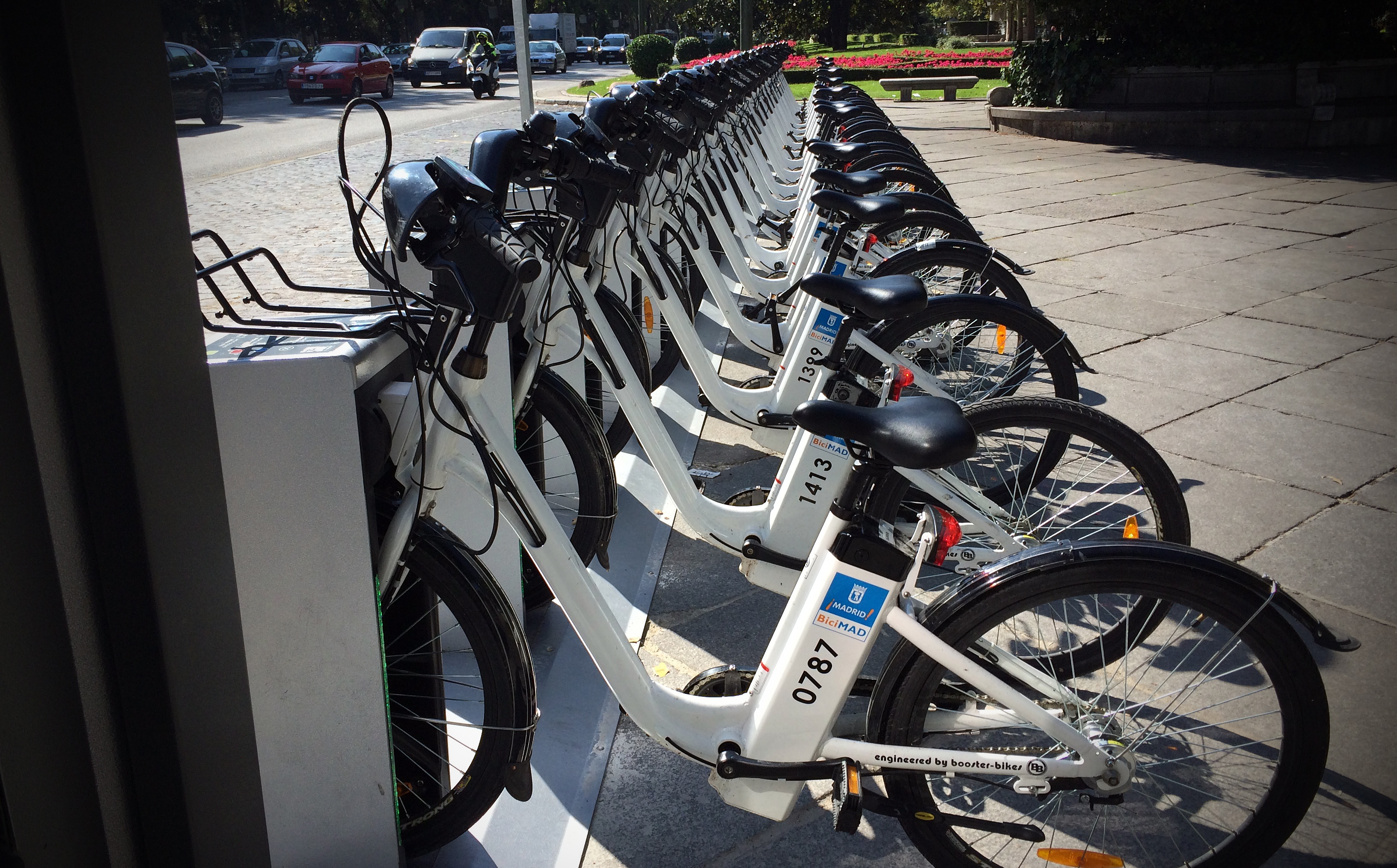
BiciMAD electric bicycles.

BiciMAD is a public service of bicycle-sharing. It began operations in 2014 and it comprises with 123 stations and 1580 bicycles.

== Bicycle Racing ==
La Vuelta a España, Spain's most popular cycling competition, always ends in Madrid.

== Anillo Verde Ciclista ==
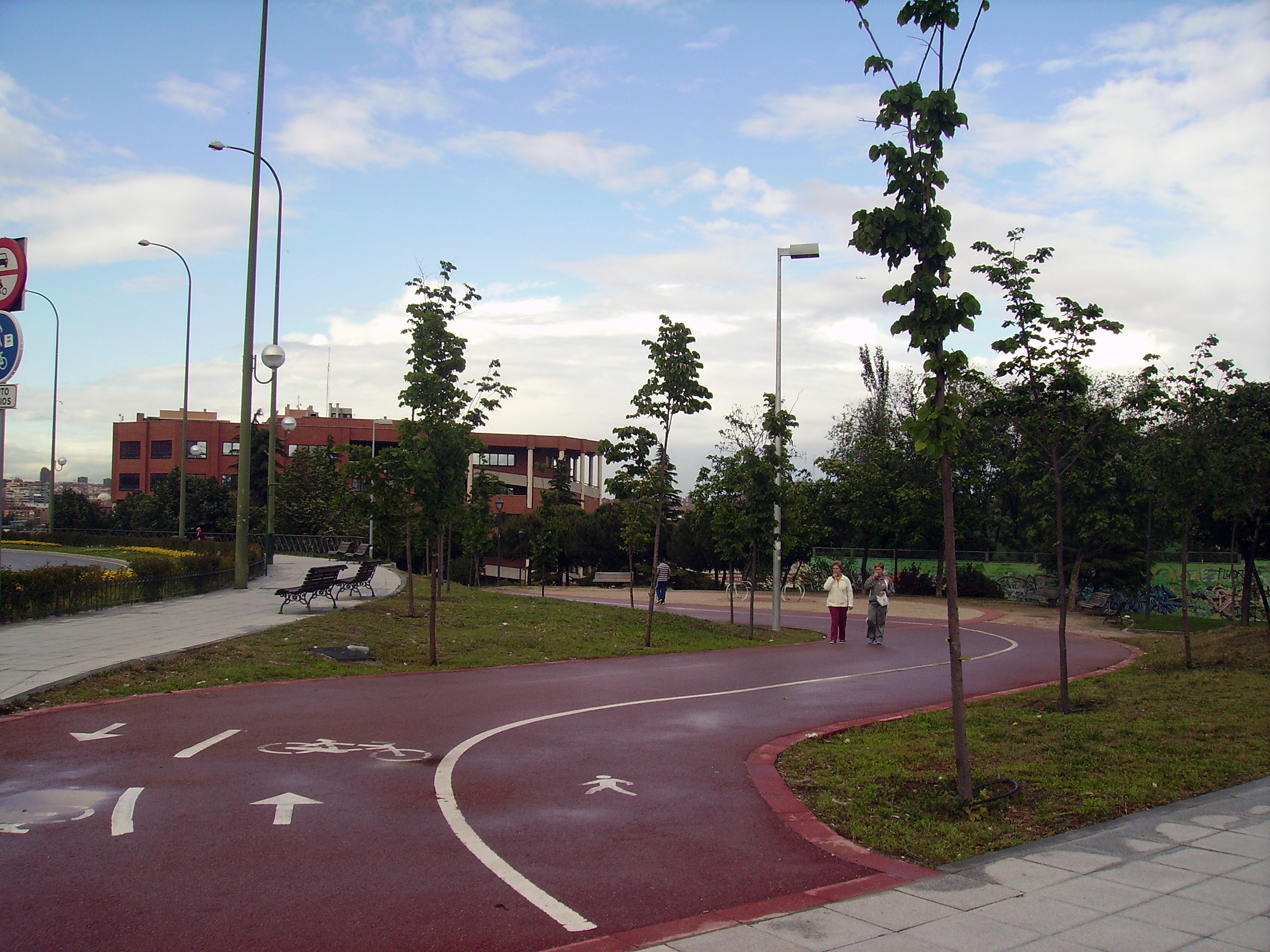
Anillo Verde Ciclista at the beginning of La Paz Avenue.

The Anillo Verde Ciclista (Cyclist Green Ring) is a bikeway that surrounds the city of Madrid. It is 64 kilometres long, and the average time to go across it is 4 hours and a half. It was built by phases, between the year 1995 and 2007.

== Madrid Río ==
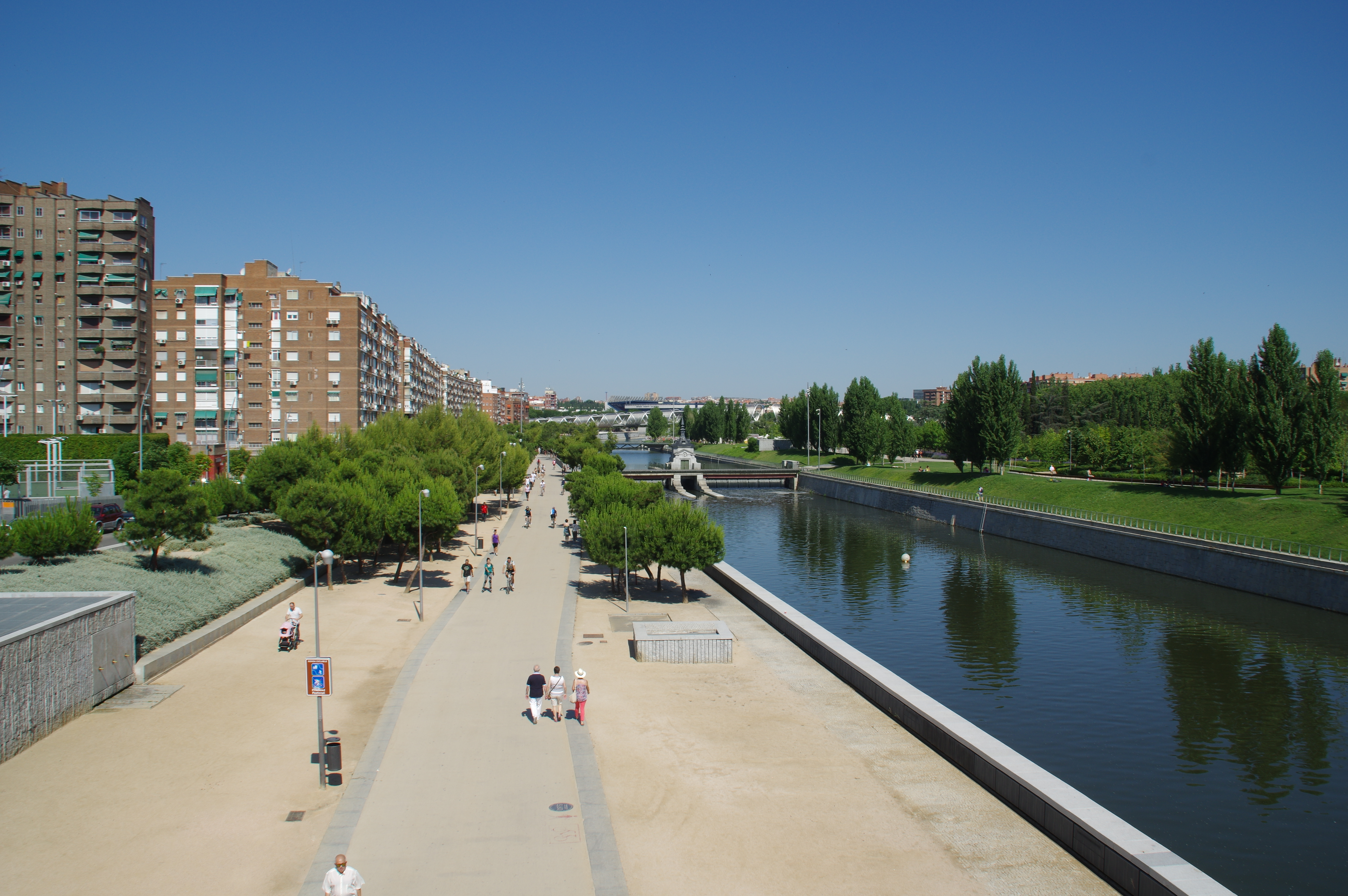
Madrid Río park.

Madrid Río (literally: Madrid River) is a park located in the banks of the Manzanares River. It opened in 2011, and it is crossed by a cycle route shared with pedestrians.
