= Tatiana Jaseková =

Slovak cyclist

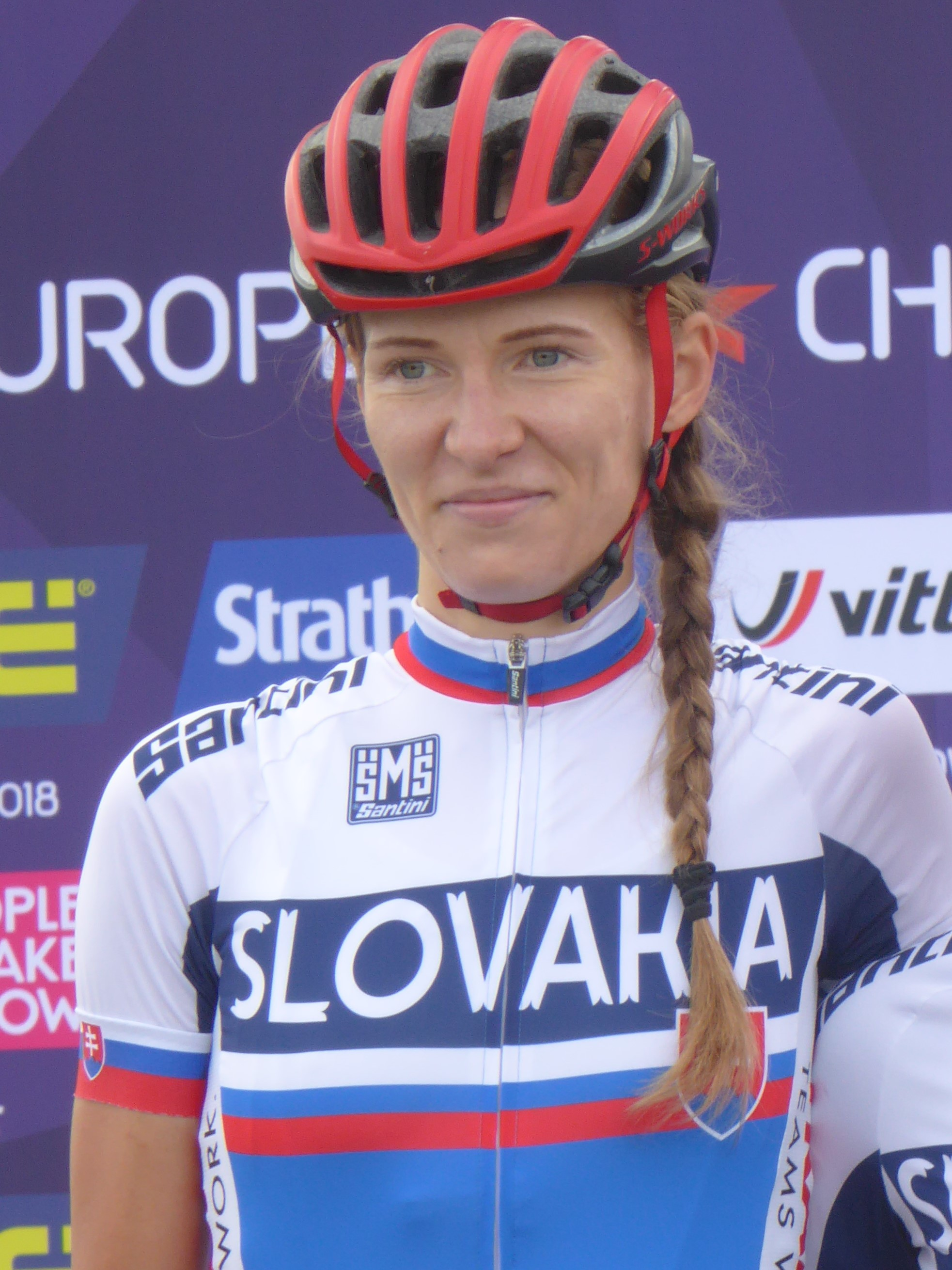
- Jaseková at the 2018 European Road Cycling Championships.

Personal information
- Born: 27 March 1988 (age 38)

Cycling career
- Sport: Cycling
- Role: Rider

Tatiana Jaseková (born 27 March 1988) is a Slovak racing cyclist. She rode in the women's time trial event at the 2018 UCI Road World Championships.
