= Lucia Valachová =

Slovak cyclist

Personal information
- Born: 31 December 1997 (age 28)

Cycling career
- Sport: Cycling
- Role: Rider

Lucia Valachová (born 31 December 1997) is a Slovak professional racing cyclist who rides for CyS Akadémia Petera Sagana.

== See also ==
- List of 2016 UCI Women's Teams and riders
