= Lenka Ilavská =

Slovak cyclist

Personal information
- Full name: Lenka Ilavská
- Born: 5 May 1972 (age 54) Liptovský Mikuláš, Czechoslovakia

Cycling career
- Sport: Cycling
- Current team: retired

Major wins
- Giro d'Italia Femminile (1993)

Lenka Ilavská (born 5 May 1972 in Liptovský Mikuláš, Žilina Region) is a retired female racing cyclist from Slovakia. She represented her native country at the 1996 Summer Olympics in Atlanta, Georgia. Her biggest achievement was winning the 1993 Giro d'Italia Femminile.

== Major results ==
1992
1st Overall Emakumeen Bira
2nd Overall Internationale Thüringen Rundfahrt Der Frauen
2nd Overall Tour de Feminin-O cenu Českého Švýcarska
1993
1st Overall Giro d'Italia Femminile
1st Overall Internationale Thüringen Rundfahrt Der Frauen
1st Time trial, National Road Championships
1st Stage 3 Emakumeen Bira
1994
1st Time trial, National Road Championships
1st Stage 7 Giro d'Italia Femminile
1st Stage 1 Volta a Portugal WE
1995
1st Overall Tour de Feminin-O cenu Českého Švýcarska
1st Time trial, National Road Championships
1996
1st Time trial, National Road Championships
1st Stage 3
7th Overall Giro d'Italia Femminile
1997
1st Time trial, National Road Championships
3rd Overall Tour de Feminin-O cenu Českého Švýcarska
10th Overall Tour Cycliste Féminin
1998
1st Time trial, National Road Championships
1st Stage 2a Emakumeen Bira
2000
1st Time trial, National Road Championships
2001
1st Time trial, National Road Championships
