= Róbert Nagy (cyclist) =

Slovak cyclist

Personal information
- Born: 4 November 1972 (age 53): Bratislava, Czechoslovakia; (now Slovakia)

Cycling career
- Sport: Cycling
- Current team: Retired
- Discipline: Road
- Role: Rider

Professional teams
- 2001: PSK–Remerx
- 2005: Sky Plastic-Kruschitz
- 2010–2011: Dukla Trenčín–Merida

Róbert Nagy (born 4 November 1972 in Bratislava) is a Slovak former cyclist.

== Major results ==
1999
1st Stage 4 Tour of Yugoslavia
2000
1st Road race, National Road Championships
2001
3rd Time trial, National Road Championships
2002
1st Stage 2 Paths of King Nikola
2nd Road race, National Road Championships
3rd Overall Grand Prix Cycliste de Gemenc

1st Stage 2

2003
1st Time trial, National Road Championships
2004
3rd Time trial, National Road Championships
2007
1st Stage 3 Tour de Hongrie
2008
2nd Time trial, National Road Championships
3rd Völkermarkter Radsporttage
2010
2nd Overall Paths of King Nikola
3rd Time trial, National Road Championships
2011
3rd Time trial, National Road Championships
3rd Central European Tour Miskolc GP
