= Abraham Olano =

Spanish cyclist (born 1970)

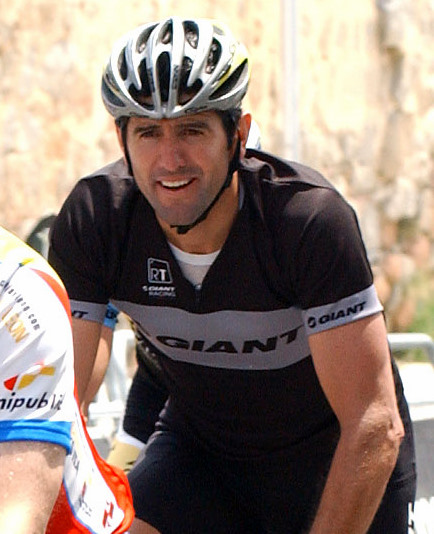
- Olano in 2006

Personal information
- Full name: Abraham Olano Manzano
- Born: 22 January 1970 (age 56) Anoeta, Spain
- Height: 1.81 m (5 ft 11 1/2 in)
- Weight: 70 kg (154 lb; 11 st 0 lb)

Cycling career
- Sport: Cycling
- Discipline: Road
- Role: Rider
- Rider type: Time trialist

Amateur team
- –: Kaiku, AVSA

Professional teams
- 1992: CHCS
- 1992: Lotus–Festina
- 1993: CLAS–Cajastur
- 1994–1997: Mapei–CLAS
- 1997–1998: Banesto
- 1999–2002: ONCE–Deutsche Bank

Major wins
- Grand Tours Tour de France 1 individual stage (1997) 2 TTT stages (2000, 2002) Vuelta a España General classification (1998) 6 individual stages (1995, 1998, 1999, 2000) Stage races Tour de Romandie (1996) Tirreno–Adriatico (2000) One-day races and Classics World Road Race Championships (1995) World Time Trial Championships (1998) National Road Race Championships (1994) National Time Trial Championships (1994, 1998)
Medal record
Men's road bicycle racing
Representing Spain
Olympic Games
Silver medal – second place	1996 Atlanta	Individual Time Trial
World Championships
Gold medal – first place	1995 Duitama	Elite Men's Road Race
Gold medal – first place	1998 Valkenburg	Elite Men's Time Trial
Silver medal – second place	1995 Duitama	Elite Men's Time Trial

Abraham Olano Manzano (Note: In this Spanish name, the first or paternal surname is Olano and the second or maternal family name is Manzano.) (born 22 January 1970) is a Spanish retired professional road racing cyclist, who raced as a professional from 1992 to 2002. He won the World Road Championship in 1995, and the World Time Trial Championship in 1998, becoming the first male cyclist to win both.

He won Vuelta a España in 1998, was second in 1995, made it twice to the final podium at Giro d'Italia (third in 1996 and second in 2001), and placed three times in the top-ten at Tour de France, with the fourth place in 1997 as his personal best. In total he won six stages in the Vuelta and one in the Tour, all of them time trials.

Olano was also double Spanish Champion in both road (1994) and time trial (1994 and 1998), olympic silver medalist in time trial in Atlanta 1996 and winner of several shorter stage races, like Tour of Romandie in 1996 and Critérium International and Tirreno–Adriatico in 2000.

== Amateur career ==
Olano started racing 11 years old at the Oria Cycling school, and already at junior level he won several races. Later, Olano went to track racing. He became Spanish Champion in pursuit (together with Etxegoyen, Pérez and Juárez), in the 1 km with standing start and in sprint. In road racing, he started as an amateur for Kaiku and AVSA. He was specialized in sprinting.

== Professional career ==
In 1992, Olano started his professional career at CHCS. This team shortly after disbanded, and he moved to Lotus. With Lotus, Olano won his first professional race, the Gran Premio de Villafranca de Ordizia in Gipuzkoa.

In 1993, Olano switched to CLAS Cajastur, which was later merged with Mapei. Here, he started to win important races, such as the Vuelta a Asturias and the Spanish National Road Race Championships, both in road race and time trial.

In 1995, Olano won three stages in the Vuelta a España, finishing second in overall classification to Laurent Jalabert. Later in the year Olano was a vital part of a hugely successful Spanish team at the World Cycling Championship in Colombia. In the time trial, Olano took silver, finishing second to Miguel Induráin. In the road race, the top two positions was reversed, with Olano taking the championship and Indurain silver. The route for the road race was one of the hardest courses ever for a World Championship, and Olano showed his stamina by riding the last kilometer solo with a flat tyre.

Olano established his abilities in stage races in 1996; he won the Tour de Romandie, finished third in the Giro d'Italia (leading the race at the second to last day), and finished ninth in the Tour de France. He also won the silver medal in the time trial at the 1996 Olympic Games, losing out to Miguel Induráin by a margin of only 12 seconds.

Amongst the pre-race favourites, Olano finished fourth in the 1997 Tour de France, taking 1 stage win – a long time trial on the penultimate day in Disneyland, finishing the stage 45 seconds ahead of the eventual Tour winner Jan Ullrich, and the performance moving him ahead of compatriot Fernando Escartin in the overall standings as the top-finishing Spaniard.

In 1998, Olano won his only grand tour, the Vuelta a España, fighting off furious challenges from mountain specialists Fernando Escartín and Roberto Heras as well as fellow all-rounders Laurent Jalabert and Alex Zülle, all at the height of their careers. Despite the victory, Olano was reportedly not happy with the support from the Banesto team and management. Banesto's own mountain specialist José María Jiménez took 4 stage wins, on several occasions leaving Olano alone on the climbs, and even taking the Yellow Jersey from his team captain. Olano won back the jersey on the second time trial, but the events and subsequent media speculation soured his relationship with Banesto, and he decided for a switch to the ONCE team for the following season.

Olano finished 1998 in style, winning the World Championship time trial in Valkenburg, ahead of compatriot Melcior Mauri. Olano was the first male rider of the modern era to win the World Championship in both the road race (1995) and the time trial (1998).

In 1999, Olano was back to defend the Vuelta title. In the prologue, severe rains put the late starters (including most of the GC contenders) at a big disadvantage, but Olano nevertheless managed to take 2nd place. In the stage 7 time trial, Olano won with a clear margin to main challenger Jan Ullrich, taking the top spot on the GC and the Yellow Jersey. Olano defended his lead through several mountain stages, but a crash on the stage to Alto de Angliru cost him a broken rib, and he was eventually forced to abandon the race.

In 2000, Olano made a shift in focusing on shorter stage races, and won Tirreno–Adriatico and Critérium International, among others. He would make his last mark at the grand Tours with a 2nd place in the 2001 Giro d'Italia. He retired from racing in 2002.

On account of results early in his career, a Basque background and some physical similarities, Olano was seen by many supporters as the successor to five-times Tour de France winner Miguel Induráin. The comparison would haunt Olano for all of his career, as he went on to have a career that was very successful by almost any other standard. Olano was one of the very best time trialists of his generation, and a rider with enormous stamina. However, he was a reluctant climber, and a tendency to lose valuable time to the specialists on the steepest and highest climbs, would keep his number of Grand Tour wins to one.

== Doping revelations ==
Olano is one of the people responsible for designing stages for the Vuelta a España. He was fired from this position after a report from the French senate revealed that he had delivered a suspicious sample during the 1998 Tour de France, indicating use of EPO. In 2013, the International Olympic Committee chose not to upgrade his fourth place finish in the 2000 Olympic Games time trial after the bronze medalist Lance Armstrong had returned his medal for doping offences, with the bronze medal left vacant in Olympic records.

== Later life ==
In November 2006 Olano ran the San Sebastián marathon in a time of 2:39:19. In October 2015, he took over as new national coach for Gabon, with the task of building the national team "from scratch".

== Major results ==
1992
1st Prueba Villafranca de Ordizia
3rd Clásica de Almería
6th Circuito de Getxo
1993
2nd Overall Vuelta a Castilla y León
7th Trofeo Luis Puig
1994
National Road Championships

1st Road race
1st Time trial

1st Overall Clásica Internacional de Alcobendas
1st Overall Vuelta a Asturias

1st Stage 2 (ITT)

2nd Trofeo Foral de Navarra
5th Time trial, UCI Road World Championships
~~6th Overall Volta a Catalunya~~

~~1st Stage 1 (ITT)~~

7th Trofeo Masferrer
1995
UCI Road World Championships

1st Road race
2nd Time trial

2nd Overall Vuelta a España

1st Prologue, Stages 7 (ITT) & 20 (ITT)
Held after Prologue & Stage 1
Held after Prologue

3rd Overall Volta a la Comunitat Valenciana
4th Overall Paris–Nice
5th Overall Setmana Catalana de Ciclisme
9th Overall Euskal Bizikleta
10th Overall Tour of Galicia
1996
1st Overall Tour de Romandie

1st Prologue & Stage 6 (ITT)

1st Overall Tour of Galicia

1st Stage 5b (ITT)

1st Circuit de l'Aulne
2nd Time trial, Olympic Games
2nd Road race, National Road Championships
2nd Grand Prix of Aargau Canton
3rd Overall Giro d'Italia

Held after Stage 20

3rd Overall Tour of the Basque Country

1st Points classification

3rd Grand Prix des Nations
4th Telekom Grand Prix (with Johan Museeuw)
6th Grand Prix Eddy Merckx
7th Overall Setmana Catalana de Ciclisme
8th Time trial, UCI Road World Championships
9th Overall Tour de France
1997
1st Overall Euskal Bizikleta

1st Stage 4b (ITT)

1st Grand Prix Eddy Merckx
2nd Overall Critérium du Dauphiné Libéré
2nd Overall Vuelta a Burgos

1st Points classification
1st Stage 4 (ITT)

2nd Overall Vuelta a Asturias

1st Prologue

2nd Gran Premio de Llodio
3rd Overall Vuelta a Aragón
4th Overall Tour de France

1st Stage 20 (ITT)

4th Trofeo Foral de Navarra
4th Classique des Alpes
5th Road race, National Road Championships
8th Overall Tour of the Basque Country
1998
1st Time trial, UCI Road World Championships
1st Time trial, National Road Championships
1st Overall Vuelta a España

1st Stage 9 (ITT)

1st Overall Vuelta a Burgos

1st Stage 1 (ITT)

1st Overall Euskal Bizikleta

1st Stage 4b (ITT)

1st Overall Vuelta a La Rioja
1st Grand Prix Eddy Merckx
2nd Overall Tour of Galicia

1st Stage 2

2nd Overall Escalada a Montjuïc
6th Overall Volta a Catalunya
1999
1st Overall Vuelta a Burgos

1st Points classification
1st Stage 1 (ITT)

Vuelta a España

1st Stage 6 (ITT)
Held after Stages 5–11

1st Stage 2b (ITT) Vuelta a Asturias
1st Stage 4b (ITT) Euskal Bizikleta
2nd Grand Prix Breitling (with Laurent Jalabert)
3rd Overall Tour of Galicia
6th Overall Tour de France
2000
1st Overall Tirreno–Adriatico

1st Stage 5 (ITT)

1st Overall Volta a la Comunitat Valenciana

1st Stage 5b (ITT)

1st Overall Critérium International
Vuelta a España

1st Stage 9 (ITT)
Held after Stage 9

1st Stage 4 (TTT) Tour de France
4th Time trial, Olympic Games
5th Time trial, UCI Road World Championships
8th Overall Tour Méditerranéen
8th Grand Prix EnBW (with Laurent Jalabert)
2001
1st Overall Clásica de Alcobendas
2nd Overall Giro d'Italia
7th GP Primavera
2002
1st Stage 4 (TTT) Tour de France
2nd Road race, National Road Championships

=== General classification results timeline ===
Grand Tour general classification results
Grand Tour	1993	1994	1995	1996	1997	1998	1999	2000	2001	2002
Giro d'Italia	—	—	—	3	—	—	—	—	2	—
Tour de France	DNF	30	—	9	4	DNF	6	34	—	78
/ Vuelta a España	—	20	2	—	DNF	1	DNF	19	64	—
Major stage race general classification results
Race	1993	1994	1995	1996	1997	1998	1999	2000	2001	2002
/ Paris–Nice	28	—	4	24	—	—	—	—	—	—
Tirreno–Adriatico	—	—	—	—	—	—	68	1	31	52
Tour of the Basque Country	97	13	DNF	3	8	DNF	40	DNF	13	37
/ Tour de Romandie	—	—	—	1	—	—	—	—	—	—
Critérium du Dauphiné	—	—	—	—	2	—	—	18	—	—
Volta a Catalunya	—	21	DNF	—	—	6	11	—	—	—
Tour de Suisse	29	—	—	—	—	—	—	—	—	—

Legend
—	Did not compete
DNF	Did not finish
