= 1998 UCI Road World Championships =

Cycling world championships

- Venue: Valkenburg, Netherlands
- Date: 4–11 October 1998
- Coordinates: 50°52′N 5°50′E
- Nations participating: 52
- Events: 10

The 1998 UCI Road World Championships took place in Valkenburg aan de Geul, Netherlands, between 4 and 11 October 1998. The event consisted of a road race and a time trial for men, women, men under 23, junior men and junior women.

== Competitors ==
A total of 52 nations competed at the 1998 UCI Road World Championships.

== Summary ==
Event	Gold		Silver		Bronze	
Men's events
Men's road race	Oskar Camenzind; Switzerland	6h01'30"	Peter van Petegem; Belgium	+ 23"	Michele Bartoli; Italy	+ 24"
Men's time trial	Abraham Olano; Spain	54'32"	Melcior Mauri; Spain	+ 37"	Serhiy Honchar; Ukraine	+ 47"
Women's events
Women's road race	Diana Žiliūtė; Lithuania	2h35'35"	Leontien Zijlaard-van Moorsel; Netherlands	s.t.	Hanka Kupfernagel; Germany	s.t.
Women's time trial	Leontien Zijlaard-van Moorsel; Netherlands	31'51"	Zulfiya Zabirova; Russia	s.t.	Hanka Kupfernagel; Germany	+ 2"
Men's Under-23 Events
Men's under-23 road race	Ivan Basso; Italy	4h30"	Rinaldo Nocentini; Italy	+ 16"	Danilo Di Luca; Italy	s.t.
Men's under-23 time trial	Thor Hushovd; Norway	43'19"	Frédéric Finot; France	+ 11"	Gianmario Ortenzi; Italy	+ 16"
Men's Junior Events
Men's Junior Road Race	Mark Scanlon; Ireland	2h54'36"	Filippo Pozzato; Italy	s.t.	Eduard Kiwischow; Russia	s.t.
Men's Junior Time Trial	Fabian Cancellara; Switzerland	29'39"	Torsten Hiekmann; Germany	+ 2"	Filippo Pozzato; Italy	+ 7"
Women's Junior Events
Women's Junior Road Race	Tina Liebig; Germany	1h46'51"	Olga Zabelinskaya; Russia	s.t.	Nathalie Bates; Australia	s.t.
Women's Junior Time Trial	Trixi Worrack; Germany	23'22"	Olga Zabelinskaya; Russia	+ 6"	Geneviève Jeanson; Canada	+ 24"
