= Miroslav Lipták =

Slovak cyclist

Personal information
- Born: 7 October 1968 (age 58) Trenčín, Czechoslovakia

Cycling career
- Sport: Cycling

Miroslav Lipták (born 7 October 1968) is a Slovak former cyclist. He competed at the 1992 Summer Olympics for Czechoslovakia and at the 1996 Summer Olympics for Slovakia.

== Major results ==
1986
1st Overall Course de la Paix Juniors
1988
10th Overall Tour de la Communauté Européenne
1989
1st Stage 8 Okolo Slovenska
1990
1st Overall Okolo Slovenska
1991
3rd Overall Peace Race
1997
1st Time trial, National Road Championships
1998
2nd Time trial, National Road Championships
2000
1st Stage 2 Tour de Serbie
