= 1995 UCI Road World Championships =

Cycling world championships

- Venue: Duitama, Colombia
- Date: 4–8 October 1995
- Coordinates: 5°50′N 73°1′W
- Events: 5

The 1995 UCI Road World Championships took place in Duitama, Colombia from October 4 to October 8, 1995. It was the last world championship that had an amateur road race: in 1996 this was replaced by an event for cyclists under 23 years.

In the same period, the 1995 UCI Track Cycling World Championships were organized in Bogotá, Colombia.

== Events summary ==
Event	Gold		Silver		Bronze	
Men's Events
Men's road race	Abraham Olano; Spain	7h09'55"	Miguel Indurain; Spain	+ 0'35"	Marco Pantani; Italy	s.t.
Men's time trial	Miguel Indurain; Spain	55'30"4	Abraham Olano; Spain	+ 0'48"97	Uwe Peschel; Germany	+ 2'03"5
Amateur road race	Danny Nelissen; Netherlands	4h52'39"	Daniele Sgnaolin; Italy	+ 0'13"	Víctor Becerra; Colombia	+ 0'46"
Women's Events
Women's road race	Jeannie Longo; France	2h37'45"	Catherine Marsal; France	+ 0'38"	Edita Pučinskaitė; Lithuania	+ 1'56"
Women's time trial	Jeannie Longo; France	44'27"3	Clara Hughes; Canada	+ 1'11"4	Kathryn Watt; Australia	+ 1'25"
