= 2014 UCI Road World Championships – Men's team time trial =

Men's team time trial
2014 UCI Road World Championships

Race details
- Dates: 21 September 2014
- Stages: 1
- Distance: 57.12 km (35.49 mi)
- Winning time: 1h 03' 29.85"

Medalists
	Gold	BMC Racing Team
	Silver	Orica–GreenEDGE
	Bronze	Omega Pharma–Quick-Step

The Men's team time trial of the 2014 UCI Road World Championships was a cycling event that took place on 21 September 2014 in Ponferrada, Spain. It was the 30th edition of the championship, and the 3rd since its reintroduction in 2012. Belgian team Omega Pharma–Quick-Step were the defending champions, having won in both 2012 and 2013.

The world title was won by BMC Racing Team, finishing 31 seconds ahead of nearest competitors Orica–GreenEDGE, with Omega Pharma–Quick-Step completing the podium in third place.

== Course ==
The course of the race was 57.1 km (35.5 mi) long. The team time trial started in the centre of Ponferrada and passed through La Martina, Posada del Bierzo, Carracedelo and Cacabelos before returning to Ponferrada. The men faced a few small climbs during the course with a total of 386 m (1,266 ft) of climbing and a maximum incline of 10%.

== Qualification ==
It was an obligation for all 2014 UCI ProTeams to participate. As well as this, invitations were sent to the 20 leading teams of the 2014 UCI Europe Tour, the top 5 leading teams of the 2013–14 UCI America Tour and 2013–14 UCI Asia Tour and the leading teams of the 2013–14 UCI Africa Tour and 2014 UCI Oceania Tour on 15 August 2014. Teams that accepted the invitation within the deadline had the right to participate. Every participating team were allowed to register nine riders from its team roster, with the exception of stagiaires, and had to select six riders to compete in the event. In total, 29 teams competed in the event.

== Schedule ==
All times are in Central European Time (UTC+1).

Date	Time	Event
21 September 2014	14:00–17:05	Men's team time trial
21 September 2014	17:25	Victory ceremony

== Prize money ==
The UCI assigned premiums for the top 5 finishers, with a total prize money of €107,198.

Position	1st	2nd	3rd	4th	5th	Total
Amount	€33,333	€20,833	€16,666	€8,333	€4,166	€107,198

== Final classification ==
Rank	Team	Riders	Time
1	(United States) BMC Racing Team	Rohan Dennis (AUS); Silvan Dillier (SUI); Daniel Oss (ITA); Manuel Quinziato (ITA); Tejay van Garderen (USA); Peter Velits (SVK)	1h 03' 29.85"
2	(Australia) Orica–GreenEDGE	Luke Durbridge (AUS); Michael Hepburn (AUS); Damien Howson (AUS); Brett Lancaster (AUS); Jens Mouris (NED); Svein Tuft (CAN)	+ 31.84"
3	(Belgium) Omega Pharma–Quick-Step	Tom Boonen (BEL); Michał Kwiatkowski (POL); Tony Martin (DEU); Pieter Serry (BEL); Niki Terpstra (NED); Julien Vermote (BEL)	+ 35.22"
4	(United Kingdom) Team Sky	Dario Cataldo (ITA); Vasil Kiryienka (BLR); Salvatore Puccio (ITA); Kanstantsin Sivtsov (BLR); Geraint Thomas (GBR); Bradley Wiggins (GBR)	+ 37.29"
5	(Russia) Tinkoff–Saxo	Daniele Bennati (ITA); Manuele Boaro (ITA); Christopher Juul-Jensen (DEN); Nicolas Roche (IRL); Michael Rogers (AUS); Michael Valgren (DEN)	+ 46.59"
6	(Spain) Movistar Team	Andrey Amador (CRC); Alex Dowsett (GBR); Imanol Erviti (ESP); Jon Izagirre (ESP); Adriano Malori (ITA); Jasha Sütterlin (DEU)	+ 51.37"
7	(United States) Trek Factory Racing	Fabian Cancellara (SUI); Markel Irizar (ESP); Yaroslav Popovych (UKR); Jesse Sergent (NZL); Jasper Stuyven (BEL); Kristof Vandewalle (BEL)	+ 1' 01.47"
8	(Netherlands) Giant–Shimano	Nikias Arndt (DEU); Tom Dumoulin (NED); Chad Haga (USA); Marcel Kittel (DEU); Tobias Ludvigsson (SWE); Georg Preidler (AUT)	+ 1' 26.60"
9	(Italy) Cannondale	Maciej Bodnar (POL); Alessandro De Marchi (ITA); Michel Koch (DEU); Kristijan Koren (SLO); Alan Marangoni (ITA); Peter Sagan (SVK)	+ 1' 28.56"
10	(United States) Garmin–Sharp	Jack Bauer (NZL); Tyler Farrar (USA); Sebastian Langeveld (NED); Ramūnas Navardauskas (LTU); Andrew Talansky (USA); Dylan van Baarle (NED)	+ 1' 44.80"
11	(France) FDJ.fr	William Bonnet (FRA); David Boucher (BEL); Mathieu Ladagnous (FRA); Johan Le Bon (FRA); Laurent Pichon (FRA); Jérémy Roy (FRA)	+ 2' 05.08"
12	(Kazakhstan) Astana	Daniil Fominykh (KAZ); Jacopo Guarnieri (ITA); Andriy Hryvko (UKR); Tanel Kangert (EST); Alexey Lutsenko (KAZ); Lieuwe Westra (NED)	+ 2' 12.38"
13	(Russia) Team Katusha	Maxim Belkov (RUS); Pavel Brutt (RUS); Vladimir Gusev (RUS); Vladimir Isaichev (RUS); Vyacheslav Kuznetsov (RUS); Gatis Smukulis (LAT)	+ 2' 14.35"
14	(Netherlands) Belkin Pro Cycling	Stef Clement (NED); Rick Flens (NED); Martijn Keizer (NED); Wilco Kelderman (NED); Maarten Tjallingii (NED); Robert Wagner (DEU)	+ 2' 28.16"
15	(Italy) Lampre–Merida	Winner Anacona (COL); Mattia Cattaneo (ITA); Roberto Ferrari (ITA); Nelson Oliveira (POR); José Serpa (COL); Rafael Valls (ESP)	+ 2' 30.08"
16	(Russia) RusVelo	Ivan Balykin (RUS); Sergey Klimov (RUS); Sergey Lagutin (RUS); Artem Ovechkin (RUS); Andrei Solomennikov (RUS); Ilnur Zakarin (RUS)	+ 2' 44.81"
17	(Belgium) Topsport Vlaanderen–Baloise	Victor Campenaerts (BEL); Pieter Jacobs (BEL); Yves Lampaert (BEL); Edward Theuns (BEL); Gijs Van Hoecke (BEL); Jelle Wallays (BEL)	+ 2' 45.29"
18	(Poland) CCC–Polsat–Polkowice	Tomasz Kiendyś (POL); Jarosław Marycz (POL); Nikolay Mihaylov (BUL); Marek Rutkiewicz (POL); Branislau Samoilau (BLR); Mateusz Taciak (POL)	+ 3' 36.90"
19	(France) Team Europcar	Jérôme Cousin (FRA); Dan Craven (NAM); Jimmy Engoulvent (FRA); Romain Guillemois (FRA); Christophe Kern (FRA); Yannick Martinez (FRA)	+ 3' 52.06"
20	(France) Ag2r–La Mondiale	Maxime Bouet (FRA); Damien Gaudin (FRA); Alexis Gougeard (FRA); Patrick Gretsch (DEU); Matteo Montaguti (ITA); Sébastien Turgot (FRA)	+ 4' 05.91"
21	(Belgium) Wanty–Groupe Gobert	Francis De Greef (BEL); Tim De Troyer (BEL); Thomas Degand (BEL); Jan Ghyselinck (BEL); Kevin Van Melsen (BEL); Frederik Veuchelen (BEL)	+ 4' 07.49"
22	(Belgium) Lotto–Belisol	Lars Bak (DEN); Vegard Breen (NOR); Adam Hansen (AUS); Greg Henderson (NZL); Pim Ligthart (NED); Maxime Monfort (BEL)	+ 4' 11.15"
23	(Spain) Caja Rural–Seguros RGA	Javier Aramendia (ESP); Pello Bilbao (ESP); Karol Domagalski (POL); Omar Fraile (ESP); Lluís Mas (ESP); Antonio Piedra (ESP)	+ 4' 29.70"
24	(Ukraine) Kolss Cycling Team	Oleksandr Golovash (UKR); Mykhaylo Kononenko (UKR); Oleksandr Kvachuk (UKR); Sergiy Lagkuti (UKR); Oleksandr Polivoda (UKR); Andriy Vasylyuk (UKR)	+ 4' 57.99"
25	(Italy) MG Kvis–Wilier	Liam Bertazzo (ITA); Matteo Busato (ITA); Riccardo Donato (ITA); Mattia Frapporti (ITA); Andrei Nechita (ROM); Lorenzo Rota (ITA)	+ 5' 36.95"
26	(Netherlands) Rabobank Development Team	Piotr Havik (NED); Lennard Hofstede (NED); Merijn Korevaar (NED); Sam Oomen (NED); Ivar Slik (NED); Martijn Tusveld (NED)	+ 6' 01.11"
27	(Slovenia) Adria Mobil	Kristjan Fajt (SLO); Bruno Maltar (CRO); Matej Mugerli (SLO); Radoslav Rogina (CRO); Primož Roglič (SLO); Klemen Štimulak (SLO)	+ 6' 12.23"
28	(Poland) BDC-Marcpol	Paweł Bernas (POL); Kamil Gradek (POL); Błażej Janiaczyk (POL); Piotr Kirpsza (POL); Jarosław Kowalczyk (POL); Adam Stachowiak (POL)	+ 6' 51.56"
29	Team Ecuador	Isaac Carbonell (ESP); Higinio Fernández (ESP); Segundo Navarrete (ECU); Jaume Rovira (ESP); Jordi Simón (ESP); Albert Torres (ESP)	+ 8' 08.46"
