= 2014 UCI Road World Championships – Men's time trial =

Men's time trial
2014 UCI Road World Championships
- Time trial Rainbow jersey

Race details
- Dates: 24 September 2014
- Stages: 1
- Distance: 47.1 km (29.27 mi)
- Winning time: 56' 25.52"

Medalists
	Gold	Bradley Wiggins (GBR)
	Silver	Tony Martin (DEU)
	Bronze	Tom Dumoulin (NED)

The Men's time trial of the 2014 UCI Road World Championships was a cycling event that took place on 24 September 2014 in Ponferrada, Spain. The 21st edition of the championship was won by reigning Olympic time trial champion, Bradley Wiggins. Germany's Tony Martin – the three-time defending champion – claimed silver, and Tom Dumoulin of the Netherlands claimed bronze.

== Qualification ==
All National Federations were allowed to enter four riders for the race, with a maximum of two riders to start. In addition to this number, the outgoing World Champion and the current continental champions were also able to take part.

Champion	Name	Participation
Outgoing World Champion	Tony Martin (DEU)	Participated; silver medal
African Champion	Daniel Teklehaymanot (ERI)	Did not participate
Pan American Champion	Pedro Herrera (COL)	Did not participate
Asian Champion	Dmitriy Gruzdev (KAZ)	Did not participate
Oceanian Champion	Joseph Cooper (NZL)	Did not participate

== Course ==
The initial plan was to have a time trial finishing uphill. This idea was discarded because it was required to have two finish sections which was not possible from a logistical and financial point of view.

The length of the individual time trial was 47.10 km (29.27 mi). The time trial started in the centre of Ponferrada and passed through La Martina, Posada del Bierzo and Carracedelo before returning to Ponferrada. A short stretch before riding into Ponferrada was made for the championships. The total elevation over the elite men's course was 458 m (1,503 ft) with a few hills in the last 15 km (9.3 mi) with a maximum inclination of 10%. The course started with a flat section of 30 km (19 mi) through the valley of Bierzo, before the parcours rose slightly. In a little under 10 km (6.2 mi) the riders rose from 550 m (1,800 ft) to an altitude of 700 m (2,300 ft). The ascent overlapped partly with the road race for men, which meant that the steepest part had a negative gradient of 16%. After 40 km (25 mi) there was another climb; in a few kilometres the riders reached the highest point in the route, located at 709 m (2,326 ft) after 43 km (27 mi), before a downhill run to the finish.

== Schedule ==
All times are in Central European Time (UTC+1).

Date	Time	Event
24 September 2014	13:30–17:00	Men's time trial
24 September 2014	17:20	Victory ceremony

== Participating nations ==
64 cyclists from 38 nations took part in the men's time trial. The number of cyclists per nation is shown in parentheses.

- Argentina (1)
- Australia (1)
- Austria (2)
- Azerbaijan (1)
- Belgium (2)
- Belarus (2)
- Canada (1)
- Chile (1)
- Colombia (1)
- Czech Republic (2)
- Denmark (2)
- Ecuador (1)
- Estonia (2)
- France (2)
- (United Kingdom) Great Britain (2)
- Germany (3)
- Hungary (2)
- (Republic of Ireland) Ireland (1)
- Italy (2)
- Kazakhstan (2)
- Latvia (2)
- Lithuania (2)
- Moldova (1)
- (North Macedonia) Macedonia (2)
- Netherlands (1)
- New Zealand (1)
- Norway (2)
- Paraguay (1)
- Poland (2)
- Portugal (2)
- Romania (2)
- Russia (2)
- Slovenia (2)
- Spain (2) (host)
- Sweden (2)
- Switzerland (1)
- Ukraine (2)
- United States (2)

== Prize money ==
The UCI assigned premiums for the top 3 finishers with a total prize money of €7,766.

Position	1st	2nd	3rd	Total
Amount	€3,833	€2,300	€1,633	€7,766

== Final classification ==
Rank	Rider	Time
1	(United Kingdom) Bradley Wiggins (GBR)	56' 25.52"
2	(Germany) Tony Martin (DEU)	+ 26.23"
3	(Netherlands) Tom Dumoulin (NED)	+ 40.64"
4	(Belarus) Vasil Kiryienka (BLR)	+ 47.92"
5	(Australia) Rohan Dennis (AUS)	+ 57.74"
6	(Italy) Adriano Malori (ITA)	+ 1' 11.62"
7	(Portugal) Nelson Oliveira (POR)	+ 1' 21.63"
8	(Russia) Anton Vorobyev (RUS)	+ 1' 29.66"
9	(Czech Republic) Jan Bárta (CZE)	+ 1' 43.41"
10	(Spain) Jonathan Castroviejo (ESP)	+ 1' 44.20"
11	(Portugal) Tiago Machado (POR)	+ 1' 52.37"
12	(New Zealand) Jesse Sergent (NZL)	+ 1' 57.02"
13	(Denmark) Rasmus Quaade (DEN)	+ 2' 16.28"
14	(Russia) Artem Ovechkin (RUS)	+ 2' 18.27"
15	(United States) Andrew Talansky (USA)	+ 2' 20.88"
16	(Poland) Maciej Bodnar (POL)	+ 2' 22.28"
17	(France) Sylvain Chavanel (FRA)	+ 2' 28.39"
18	(Switzerland) Silvan Dillier (SUI)	+ 2' 30.77"
19	(Estonia) Tanel Kangert (EST)	+ 2' 32.62"
20	(United Kingdom) Alex Dowsett (GBR)	+ 2' 35.10"
21	(Moldova) Alexandre Pliușchin (MDA)	+ 2' 47.90"
22	(Germany) Nikias Arndt (DEU)	+ 2' 48.60"
23	(Chile) Carlos Oyarzun (CHI)	+ 2' 52.80"
24	(Belgium) Kristof Vandewalle (BEL)	+ 3' 06.67"
25	(France) Jérôme Coppel (FRA)	+ 3' 08.64"
26	(Kazakhstan) Alexsandr Dyachenko (KAZ)	+ 3' 11.21"
27	(Austria) Riccardo Zoidl (AUT)	+ 3' 15.71"
28	(Canada) Svein Tuft (CAN)	+ 3' 18.18"
29	(Czech Republic) Petr Vakoč (CZE)	+ 3' 18.47"
30	(Italy) Dario Cataldo (ITA)	+ 3' 25.26"
31	(Belgium) Pieter Serry (BEL)	+ 3' 30.13"
32	(Poland) Mateusz Taciak (POL)	+ 3' 31.78"
33	(Sweden) Tobias Ludvigsson (SWE)	+ 3' 33.30"
34	(Spain) Markel Irizar (ESP)	+ 3' 39.23"
35	(Austria) Matthias Brändle (AUT)	+ 3' 39.69"
36	(Estonia) Rein Taaramäe (EST)	+ 3' 40.36"
37	(United States) Tejay van Garderen (USA)	+ 3' 44.16"
38	(Kazakhstan) Daniil Fominykh (KAZ)	+ 3' 48.05"
39	(Lithuania) Ignatas Konovalovas (LTU)	+ 3' 49.51"
40	(Slovenia) Kristijan Koren (SLO)	+ 3' 50.32"
41	(Republic of Ireland) Nicolas Roche (IRL)	+ 3' 50.39"
42	(Belarus) Kanstantsin Sivtsov (BLR)	+ 3' 52.16"
43	(Ukraine) Andriy Vasylyuk (UKR)	+ 3' 54.96"
44	(Romania) Serghei Tvetcov (ROU)	+ 3' 56.62"
45	(Norway) Vegard Breen (NOR)	+ 4' 00.51"
46	(Colombia) Winner Anacona (COL)	+ 4' 01.56"
47	(Latvia) Gatis Smukulis (LAT)	+ 4' 10.83"
48	(Germany) Lars Teutenberg (DEU)	+ 4' 12.81"
49	(Lithuania) Ramūnas Navardauskas (LTU)	+ 4' 32.05"
50	(Latvia) Aleksejs Saramotins (LAT)	+ 4' 33.65"
51	(Argentina) Eduardo Sepúlveda (ARG)	+ 5' 11.23"
52	(Romania) Andrei Nechita (ROU)	+ 5' 33.44"
53	(Denmark) Lasse Norman Hansen (DEN)	+ 5' 50.45"
54	(Norway) Reidar Borgersen (NOR)	+ 5' 58.32"
55	(Hungary) Žsolt Der (HUN)	+ 6' 27.65"
56	(Slovenia) Matej Mohorič (SLO)	+ 6' 46.48"
57	(Hungary) Gábor Fejes (HUN)	+ 6' 49.32"
58	(Ukraine) Oleksandr Golovash (UKR)	+ 8' 05.49"
59	(Azerbaijan) Elchin Asadov (AZE)	+ 9' 03.77"
60	(Paraguay) Gustavo Miño (PAR)	+ 9' 46.54"
61	(Ecuador) Segundo Navarrete (ECU)	+ 10' 48.63"
62	(North Macedonia) Veli Sadiki (MKD)	+ 13' 37.86"
63	(North Macedonia) Gorgi Popstefanov (MKD)	+ 14' 33.34"
	(Sweden) Alexander Gingsjö (SWE)	DNF
