= 2015 UCI Road World Championships – Qualification =

This page is an overview of the qualification criteria for the 2015 UCI Road World Championships.

== Elite events ==
=== Elite men's road race ===
Qualification was based on performances on the UCI run tours during 2015. Results from January to the middle of August counted towards the qualification criteria on both the 2015 UCI World Tour and the UCI Continental Circuits across the world, with the rankings being determined upon the release of the numerous tour rankings on August 15, 2015.

The following 51 nations qualified.

Number of riders	Nations
14 to enter, 9 to start	Australia, Belgium, Colombia, France, Germany, Great Britain, Italy, Netherlands, Spain
9 to enter, 6 to start	Algeria, Canada, Czech Republic, Denmark, Iran, Norway, Poland, Russia, Slovenia, Ukraine, United States, Venezuela
5 to enter, 3 to start	Argentina, Austria, Belarus, Brazil, Costa Rica, Croatia, Estonia, Ireland, Japan, Kazakhstan, Lithuania, Luxembourg, Morocco, New Zealand, Portugal, Slovakia, South Africa, South Korea, Switzerland, Turkey
2 to enter, 1 to start	Azerbaijan, Chile, Ecuador, Eritrea, Greece, Guatemala, Latvia, Romania, Serbia, Tunisia

=== Elite women's road race ===
Qualification was based mainly on the 2015 UCI Nation Ranking as of 15 August 2015. The first five nations in this classification qualified seven riders to start, the next ten nations qualified six riders to start and the next five nations qualified five riders to start. Other nations and non ranked nations had the possibility to send three riders to start.

- Netherlands (7)
- Italy (7)
- United States (7)
- Germany (7)
- Australia (7)
- France (6)
- Belgium (6)
- Great Britain (6)
- Sweden (6)
- Poland (6)
- Canada (6)
- South Africa (6)
- Belarus (6)
- Ukraine (6)
- Russia (6)
- Luxembourg (5)
- New Zealand (5)
- Finland (5)
- Brazil (5)
- Norway (5)
- Other nations (3)

Moreover, the outgoing World Champion and continental champions were also able to take part in the race on top of the nation numbers.

Champion	Name	Note
Outgoing World Champion	Pauline Ferrand-Prévot (FRA)	
African Champion	Ashleigh Moolman (RSA)	
European Champion (under-23)	Katarzyna Niewiadoma (POL)	
Pan American Champion	Marlies Mejías (CUB)	Did not participate
Asian Champion	Ting Ying Huang (TPE)	Did not participate
Oceanian Champion	Lauren Kitchen (AUS)	

=== Elite men's time trial ===
All National Federations were allowed to enter four riders for the race, with a maximum of two riders to start. In addition to this number, the outgoing World Champion and the current continental champions were also able to take part.

Champion	Name	Participation
Outgoing World Champion	Bradley Wiggins (GBR)	Will not participate
African Champion	Tsgabu Grmay (ETH)	Will not participate
Pan American Champion	Carlos Oyarzun (CHI)	Will not participate
Asian Champion	Hossein Askari (IRI)	Will not participate
Oceanian Champion	Michael Hepburn (AUS)	Scheduled to participate

=== Elite women's time trial ===
All National Federations were allowed to enter four riders for the race, with a maximum of two riders to start. In addition to this number, the outgoing World Champion and the current continental champions were also able to take part.

Champion	Name	Note
Outgoing World Champion	Lisa Brennauer (GER)	
Pan American Champion	Carmen Small (USA)	
European Champion (under-23)	Mieke Kröger (GER)	
African Champion	Ashleigh Moolman (RSA)	Did not participate
Asian Champion	Na Ah-reum (KOR)	Did not participate
Oceanian Champion	Katrin Garfoot (AUS)	

=== Men's team time trial ===
It was an obligation for all 2015 UCI ProTeams to participate. As well as this, invitations were sent to the 20 leading teams of the 2015 UCI Europe Tour, the top 5 leading teams of the 2015 UCI America Tour and 2015 UCI Asia Tour and the leading teams of the 2015 UCI Africa Tour and 2015 UCI Oceania Tour on August 15, 2015. Teams that accepted the invitation within the deadline had the right to participate. Every participating team were allowed to register nine riders from its team roster, with the exception of stagiaires, and had to select six riders to compete in the event.

=== Women's team time trial ===
Invitations were sent to the 25 leading UCI Women's Teams in the UCI Team Ranking as of August 15, 2015. Teams that accepted the invitation within the deadline had the right to participate. Every participating team had the opportunity to register nine riders from its team roster, with the exception of stagiaires, and had to select six riders to compete in the event.

Also a few lower ranked American UCI teams were invited.

Teams that did not accept the invitation are listed below in italics.

#	Nat	Team
1	(Netherlands)	Rabobank-Liv Woman Cycling Team
2	(Netherlands)	Boels–Dolmans
3	(United Kingdom)	Wiggle–Honda
4	(Germany)	Velocio–SRAM
5	(Australia)	Orica–AIS
6	(Switzerland)	Bigla Pro Cycling Team
7	(Norway)	Team Hitec Products
8	(Netherlands)	Team Liv–Plantur
9	(Italy)	Alé–Cipollini
10	(United States)	UnitedHealthcare
11	(United States)	Optum–Kelly Benefit Strategies
12	(France)	Poitou-Charentes.Futuroscope.86
13	(United States)	Team TIBCO–SVB
14	(Belgium)	Lotto–Soudal Ladies
15	(Italy)	BePink–La Classica
16	(Italy)	Inpa Sottoli Giusfredi
17	(Slovenia)	BTC City Ljubljana
18	(Belgium)	Topsport Vlaanderen–Pro-Duo
19	(Netherlands)	Parkhotel Valkenburg Continental Team
20	(Spain)	Lointek
21	(United States)	Twenty16 p/b Sho-Air
22	(Italy)	Servetto Footon
23	(Belgium)	Lensworld.eu–Zannata
24	(Italy)	S.C. Michela Fanini Rox
25	(Italy)	Aromitalia Vaiano
	(United States)	BMW p/b Happy Tooth Dental
	(United States)	Pepper Palace p/b The Happy Tooth

== Qualification ==
Qualification was based on performances on the UCI run tours and the Men Under 23 Nations' Cup during 2015. Results from January to the middle of August counted towards the qualification criteria. In addition to this number, the current continental champions were also able to take part. The outgoing World Champion, Matej Mohorič, did not compete as he was no longer eligible – he moved to the UCI ProTeam Cannondale–Garmin for the 2015 season. If a nation is included in the final classification of the Men Under 23 Nations’ Cup, but that nation is not yet qualified, it may register 6 riders, 3 of whom will be a starters. The first 5 nations of the final classification of the Men Under 23 Nations’ Cup are entitled to an extra rider.

Number of riders	Nations
10 to enter, 5 to start	Algeria, Colombia, Chile, Argentina, Kazakhstan, South Korea, France, Italy, Denmark, Netherlands, Germany, Belgium, Norway, Austria, United Kingdom, Turkey, Russia, Estonia, Switzerland, Belarus, Slovakia, Australia
8 to enter, 4 to start	Eritrea, United States, Canada, Mexico, Iran, Japan, Spain, Israel, Czech Republic, Sweden, Portugal
6 to enter, 3 to start	Morocco, South Africa, Rwanda, Venezuela, El Salvador, Ecuador, Lebanon, Hong Kong, Philippines, Ukraine, Slovenia, Serbia, Moldova, Bosnia and Herzegovina, Croatia, Greece, New Zealand
2 to enter, 1 to start	Aruba, Bermuda, Latvia, Georgia

In addition to this number the current continental champions were also able to take part.

Champion	Name
Asian Champion	Yuma Koishi (JPN)
Pan American Champion	Jhonatan Restrepo (COL)
European Champion	Erik Baška (SVK)

=== Men's under-23 time trial ===
All National Federations were allowed to enter four riders for the race, with a maximum of two riders to start. In addition to this number, the outgoing World Champion and the current continental champions were also able to take part. The outgoing world champion Campbell Flakemore did not compete, as he was no longer eligible to contest under-23 races.

Champion	Name
Pan American Champion	Ignacio Prado (MEX)
Asian Champion	Sang-Hoon Park (KOR)
European Champion	Steven Lammertink (NED)
Oceanian Champion	Harry Carpenter (AUS)

== Junior events ==
=== Women's junior road race ===
All National Federations were allowed to enter eight riders for the race, with a maximum of four riders to start. In addition to this number, the outgoing World Champion and the current continental champions were also able to take part. The outgoing World Champion, Amalie Dideriksen, did not compete as she was no longer eligible to contest junior races.

Champion	Name
African Champion	Helen Mitchell (RSA)
Pan American Champion	Karen Flores (MEX)
Asian Champion	Yumi Kajihara (JPN)
European Champion	Nadia Quagliotto (ITA)
Oceanian	Kristina Clonan (AUS)

=== Men's junior time trial ===
All National Federations were allowed to enter four riders for the race, with a maximum of two riders to start. In addition to this number, the outgoing World Champion and the current continental champions were also able to take part.

Champion	Name	Note
Outgoing World Champion	Lennard Kämna (GER)	Did not participate
African Champion	Gregory De Vink (RSA)	
European Champion	Nikolay Ilichev (GER)	
Oceanian Champion	Michael Storer (AUS)	
Pan American Champion	Julian Cardona (COL)	
Asian Champion	Ka Hoo Fung (HKG)	Did not participate

=== Women's junior time trial ===
All National Federations were allowed to enter four riders for the race, with a maximum of two riders to start. In addition to this number the current continental champions were also able to take part. The outgoing World Champion, Séverine Eraud, did not compete as she was no longer eligible to contest junior races.

Champion	Name
African Champion	Frances Du Toit (RSA)
Asian Champion	Yumi Kajihara (JPN)
Pan American Champion	Camila Valbuena (COL)
European Champion	Agnieszka Skalniak (POL)
Oceanian Champion	Anna-Leeza Hull (AUS)
