= 2014 UCI Road World Championships – Men's junior time trial =

Men's junior time trial
2014 UCI Road World Championships
- Time trial Rainbow jersey

Race details
- Dates: 23 September 2014
- Stages: 1
- Distance: 29.50 km (18.33 mi)
- Winning time: 36' 13.49"

Medalists
	Gold	Lennard Kämna (DEU)
	Silver	Adrien Costa (USA)
	Bronze	Michael Storer (AUS)

The Men's junior time trial of the 2014 UCI Road World Championships took place in and around Ponferrada, Spain on 23 September 2014. The course of the race was 29.50 km (18.33 mi) with the start and finish in Ponferrada.

Lennard Kämna became the first German rider to win the world title since Marcel Kittel in 2006, with a winning margin of almost 45 seconds over his nearest competitor. The silver medal went to American rider Adrien Costa, with the bronze medal going to Australia's Michael Storer; Costa and Storer were the only riders to get within a minute of Kämna's time.

== Qualification ==
All National Federations were allowed to enter four riders for the race, with a maximum of two riders to start. In addition to this number, the outgoing World Champion and the current continental champions were also able to take part.

For the event, competing riders used numbers 2 to 70, as number 1 was left unused. Number 1 was scheduled to be worn by the defending World Champion, Igor Decraene, but three weeks prior to the championships – on 30 August 2014 – Decraene was killed in Zulte, Belgium, while returning from a house party.

Champion	Name	Note
Outgoing World Champion	Igor Decraene (BEL)	Did not participate (deceased)
African Champion	Ivan Venter (RSA)	
European Champion	Lennard Kämna (DEU)	
Oceanian Champion	Michael Storer (AUS)	
Pan American Champion	Jaime Restrepo (COL)	
Asian Champion	Kim Ji-Hun (KOR)	Did not participate

== Course ==
The course of the men's junior time trial was 29.50 km (18.33 mi); it was held over the same course as the women's time trial. The time trial started in the centre of Ponferrada and passed through La Martina, Posada del Bierzo and Carracedelo before returning to Ponferrada. The total incline of the course was 172 m (564 ft). A few kilometres before the finish there was a climb, with an incline of over 100 m (330 ft) and a maximum inclination of 7%. A short stretch before riding into Ponferrada was made for the championships.

== Schedule ==
All times are in Central European Time (UTC+1).

Date	Time	Event
23 September 2014	10:00–12:40	Men's junior time trial
23 September 2014	13:00	Victory ceremony

== Participating nations ==
69 cyclists from 40 nations took part in the men's junior time trial. The number of cyclists per nation is shown in parentheses.

- Algeria (2)
- Argentina (1)
- Australia (1)
- Azerbaijan (2)
- Belgium (2)
- Belarus (2)
- Brazil (1)
- Canada (1)
- Colombia (2)
- Denmark (2)
- Ecuador (1)
- Egypt (2)
- Estonia (2)
- France (2)
- (United Kingdom) Great Britain (1)
- Germany (3)
- Hungary (1)
- (Republic of Ireland) Ireland (2)
- Italy (2)
- Japan (1)
- Kazakhstan (2)
- Luxembourg (2)
- Morocco (2)
- (North Macedonia) Macedonia (1)
- Norway (2)
- Poland (2)
- Portugal (2)
- Romania (1)
- Russia (2)
- Slovakia (1)
- Slovenia (2)
- South Africa (2)
- Spain (2) (host)
- Sweden (2)
- Switzerland (2)
- Turkey (2)
- Ukraine (2)
- Uruguay (1)
- United States (2)
- Uzbekistan (2)

== Prize money ==
The UCI assigned premiums for the top 3 finishers with a total prize money of €1,380.

Position	1st	2nd	3rd	Total
Amount	€767	€383	€230	€1,380

== Final classification ==
Rank	Rider	Time
1	(Germany) Lennard Kämna (DEU)	36' 13.49"
2	(United States) Adrien Costa (USA)	+ 44.66"
3	(Australia) Michael Storer (AUS)	+ 58.11"
4	(Italy) Filippo Ganna (ITA)	+ 1' 05.94"
5	(United States) Zeke Mostov (USA)	+ 1' 19.13"
6	(Luxembourg) Tom Wirtgen (LUX)	+ 1' 29.86"
7	(Germany) Sven Reutter (DEU)	+ 1' 34.27"
8	(Republic of Ireland) Michael O'Loughlin (IRL)	+ 1' 42.81"
9	(Colombia) Jaime Restrepo (COL)	+ 1' 43.89"
10	(United Kingdom) Matthew Gibson (GBR)	+ 1' 46.81"
11	(Germany) Jan Tschernoster (DEU)	+ 1' 47.53"
12	(Denmark) Niklas Larsen (DEN)	+ 1' 51.55"
13	(Poland) Mikołaj Gutek (POL)	+ 1' 58.45"
14	(France) Corentin Ermenault (FRA)	+ 2' 01.63"
15	(Norway) Tobias Foss (NOR)	+ 2' 01.77"
16	(Ukraine) Mark Padun (UKR)	+ 2' 10.57"
17	(Poland) Szymon Sajnok (POL)	+ 2' 17.32"
18	(Russia) Nikolay Ilichev (RUS)	+ 2' 21.66"
19	(Switzerland) Gino Mäder (SUI)	+ 2' 22.71"
20	(Belgium) Senne Leysen (BEL)	+ 2' 22.99"
21	(Italy) Edoardo Affini (ITA)	+ 2' 34.67"
22	(Ukraine) Vitaliy Novakovskyi (UKR)	+ 2' 36.20"
23	(Kazakhstan) Alisher Zhumakan (KAZ)	+ 2' 37.00"
24	(Belgium) Martin Palm (BEL)	+ 2' 45.51"
25	(France) Jérémy Defaye (FRA)	+ 2' 46.05"
26	(Denmark) Anders Hardahl (DEN)	+ 2' 55.93"
27	(Belarus) Anton Ivashkin (BLR)	+ 2' 56.25"
28	(South Africa) Gustav Basson (RSA)	+ 2' 56.35"
29	(Sweden) Hampus Anderberg (SWE)	+ 2' 56.92"
30	(Portugal) Ivo Oliveira (POR)	+ 3' 00.96"
31	(Slovenia) Izidor Penko (SLO)	+ 3' 03.41"
32	(Ecuador) Adrián Jaramillo (ECU)	+ 3' 03.54"
33	(Norway) Erlend Blikra (NOR)	+ 3' 07.45"
34	(Republic of Ireland) Mark Downey (IRL)	+ 3' 09.49"
35	(Switzerland) Martin Schäppi (SUI)	+ 3' 10.48"
36	(North Macedonia) Andrej Petrovski (MKD)	+ 3' 27.13"
37	(Colombia) Daniel Martínez (COL)	+ 3' 27.46"
38	(Kazakhstan) Yuriy Natarov (KAZ)	+ 3' 28.71"
39	(Luxembourg) Kevin Geniets (LUX)	+ 3' 30.05"
40	(Belarus) Ilya Volkau (BLR)	+ 3' 30.94"
41	(Turkey) Onur Balkan (TUR)	+ 3' 34.33"
42	(Argentina) Facundo Crisafulli (ARG)	+ 3' 35.36"
43	(Russia) Petr Rikunov (RUS)	+ 3' 36.42"
44	(South Africa) Ivan Venter (RSA)	+ 3' 36.84"
45	(Portugal) Tiago Antunes (POR)	+ 3' 38.71"
46	(Sweden) Gustaf Andersson (SWE)	+ 3' 40.94"
47	(Canada) Pier-André Côté (CAN)	+ 3' 41.33"
48	(Brazil) André Gohr (BRA)	+ 3' 44.80"
49	(Slovenia) Jon Božič (SLO)	+ 3' 50.26"
50	(Estonia) Ekke-Kaur Vosman (EST)	+ 3' 54.03"
51	(Turkey) Alihan Demirbağ (TUR)	+ 3' 55.35"
52	(Slovakia) David Zverko (SVK)	+ 3' 57.09"
53	(Spain) Diego López (ESP)	+ 4' 00.15"
54	(Algeria) Islam Mansouri (ALG)	+ 4' 15.59"
55	(Spain) Xavier Cañellas (ESP)	+ 4' 18.54"
56	(Japan) Keigo Kusaba (JPN)	+ 4' 24.98"
57	(Estonia) Norman Vahtra (EST)	+ 4' 34.99"
58	(Morocco) Abderrahim Zahiri (MAR)	+ 4' 48.48"
59	(Morocco) El Mehdi Chokri (MAR)	+ 4' 52.87"
60	(Romania) Emil Dima (ROU)	+ 5' 19.51"
61	(Algeria) Zoheir Benyoub (ALG)	+ 5' 21.21"
62	(Uruguay) Brian Carro (URU)	+ 5' 23.26"
63	(Uzbekistan) Roman Shukurov (UZB)	+ 5' 30.31"
64	(Azerbaijan) Elgun Alizada (AZE)	+ 5' 40.09"
65	(Hungary) Dávid Karl (HUN)	+ 6' 16.39"
66	(Azerbaijan) Kanan Gahramanli (AZE)	+ 6' 46.04"
67	(Egypt) Ayman Elsayed Imam (EGY)	+ 7' 07.40"
68	(Egypt) Mohamed Eleiwa Helal (EGY)	+ 7' 35.12"
69	(Uzbekistan) Ulugbek Saidov (UZB)	+ 8' 38.99"
