= 2014 UCI Road World Championships – Men's junior road race =

Men's junior road race
2014 UCI Road World Championships
- Rainbow jersey

Race details
- Dates: 27 September 2014
- Stages: 1
- Distance: 127.40 km (79.16 mi)
- Winning time: 3h 07' 00"

Medalists
	Gold	Jonas Bokeloh (DEU)
	Silver	Alexandr Kulikovskiy (RUS)
	Bronze	Peter Lenderink (NED)

The Men's junior road race of the 2014 UCI Road World Championships took place in and around Ponferrada, Spain on 27 September 2014. The course of the race was 127.40 km (79.16 mi) with the start and finish in Ponferrada.

In a sprint finish of 32 riders, Jonas Bokeloh became the first German rider since Holger Loew in 1996, to win the junior world title. He out-sprinted Russia's Alexandr Kulikovskiy and Peter Lenderink of the Netherlands for the gold medal.

== Qualification ==
Qualification was based mainly on the final UCI Juniors Nations' Cup ranking as of 15 August 2014. The first ten nations in this classification qualified six riders to start, the next five nations qualified five riders to start and the next five nations qualified four riders to start. Spain, as the organising nation, were entitled to five riders to start. Other nations and non ranked nations had the opportunity to send three riders to start. Moreover, continental champions were qualified to take part in the race, on top of the nation numbers. The outgoing World Champion, Mathieu van der Poel, did not compete as he was no longer eligible to contest junior races.

Tour	Position	Number of riders	Nations
UCI Juniors Nations' Cup ranking	1–10	12 to enter, 6 to start	France; Denmark; Belgium; Germany; United States; Russia; Italy; Norway; Slovenia; Netherlands
UCI Juniors Nations' Cup ranking	11–15	10 to enter, 5 to start	Switzerland; United Kingdom; Australia; Sweden; Ireland
UCI Juniors Nations' Cup ranking	16–20	8 to enter, 4 to start	Kazakhstan; Canada; Czech Republic; Japan; Slovakia
Organizing nation	—N/a	10 to enter, 5 to start	Spain
Other nations	—N/a	6 to enter, 3 to start	TBD
Champion	Name		
African Champion	Abderrahim Zahiri (MAR)		
Pan American Champion	Wilmar Paredes (COL)		
Asian Champion	Grigoriy Shtein (KAZ)		
European Champion (under-23)	Edoardo Affini (ITA)		
Oceanian Champion	Lucas Hamilton (AUS)		

== Course ==
The race was held on the same circuit as the other road races and consisted of seven laps. The circuit was 18.20 km (11.31 mi) long and included two hills. The total climbing was 306 m (1,004 ft) per lap and the maximum incline was 10.7%.

The first 4 km (2.5 mi) were flat, after which the climb to Alto de Montearenas started, with an average gradient of 8%. After a few hundred metres the ascent flattened and the remaining 5.1 km (3.2 mi) were at an average gradient of 3.5%. Next was a descent, with the steepest point after 11 km (6.8 mi) at a 16% negative gradient.

The Alto de Compostilla was a short climb of 1.1 km (0.68 mi), at an average gradient is 6.5% with some of the steepest parts at 11%. The remaining distance of 4.5 km (2.8 mi) was downhill thereafter, prior to the finish in Ponferrada.

== Schedule ==
All times are in Central European Time (UTC+1).

Date	Time	Event
27 September 2014	09:00–12:15	Men's junior road race
27 September 2014	12:35	Victory ceremony

== Participating nations ==
187 cyclists from 55 nations took part in the men's junior road race. The number of cyclists per nation is shown in parentheses.

- Albania (2)
- Algeria (3)
- Argentina (2)
- Australia (4)
- Austria (3)
- Azerbaijan (2)
- Belgium (6)
- Belarus (3)
- Brazil (2)
- Canada (4)
- Chile (1)
- Colombia (4)
- Croatia (1)
- Czech Republic (1)
- Denmark (6)
- Ecuador (1)
- Egypt (2)
- El Salvador (1)
- Estonia (3)
- Finland (3)
- France (6)
- (United Kingdom) Great Britain (5)
- Germany (6)
- Hungary (2)
- (Republic of Ireland) Ireland (5)
- Israel (3)
- Italy (7)
- Japan (4)
- Kazakhstan (5)
- Latvia (3)
- Liechtenstein (1)
- Luxembourg (3)
- Morocco (4)
- Mexico (3)
- (North Macedonia) Macedonia (1)
- Netherlands (6)
- Norway (6)
- Poland (3)
- Portugal (3)
- Romania (2)
- Russia (6)
- Serbia (2)
- Slovakia (4)
- Slovenia (6)
- South Africa (3)
- Spain (5) (host)
- Sweden (4)
- Switzerland (5)
- Turkey (3)
- Ukraine (3)
- Uruguay (1)
- United States (6)
- Uzbekistan (3)
- Venezuela (3)
- Vietnam (1)

== Prize money ==
The UCI assigned premiums for the top 3 finishers with a total prize money of €3,450.

Position	1st	2nd	3rd	Total
Amount	€1,533	€1,150	€767	€3,450

== Results ==
=== Final classification ===
Of the race's 187 entrants, 110 riders completed the full distance of 127.4 km (79.2 mi).

Rank	Rider	Country	Time
1	Jonas Bokeloh	Germany	3h 07' 00"
2	Alexandr Kulikovskiy	Russia	s.t.
3	Peter Lenderink	Netherlands	s.t.
4	Edoardo Affini	Italy	s.t.
5	Magnus Klaris	Denmark	s.t.
6	Izidor Penko	Slovenia	s.t.
7	Lucas Eriksson	Sweden	s.t.
8	Lorenzo Fortunato	Italy	s.t.
9	Leo Danes	France	s.t.
10	Sjoerd Bax	Netherlands	s.t.
11	Jordi Warlop	Belgium	s.t.
12	Wilmar Paredes	Colombia	s.t.
13	Emiel Planckaert	Belgium	s.t.
14	Gino Mäder	Switzerland	s.t.
15	Moritz Fußnegger	Germany	s.t.
16	James Shaw	Great Britain	s.t.
17	Masahiro Ishigami	Japan	s.t.
18	Mitchell Cornelisse	Netherlands	s.t.
19	Christian Koch	Germany	s.t.
20	Martin Schäppi	Switzerland	s.t.
21	Aurélien Paret-Peintre	France	s.t.
22	Pascal Eenkhoorn	Netherlands	s.t.
23	Jonas Gregaard	Denmark	s.t.
24	Jai Hindley	Australia	s.t.
25	Senne Leysen	Belgium	s.t.
26	Benjamin Brkić	Austria	s.t.
27	Michael Storer	Australia	s.t.
28	Mark Padun	Ukraine	s.t.
29	Ward Jaspers	Belgium	s.t.
30	Stepan Kurianov	Russia	s.t.
31	Andrej Petrovski	North Macedonia	s.t.
32	Vincenzo Albanese	Italy	s.t.
33	Hampus Anderberg	Sweden	+ 8"
34	James Thompson	Australia	+ 12"
35	Tamirlan Tassymov	Kazakhstan	+ 16"
36	Zeno Caminada	Switzerland	+ 20"
37	Kevin Geniets	Luxembourg	+ 37"
38	Øyvind Skog	Norway	+ 38"
39	Pavel Sivakov	Russia	+ 38"
40	Jaime Restrepo	Colombia	+ 1' 10"
41	Filippo Ganna	Italy	+ 1' 10"
42	Maxim Satlikov	Kazakhstan	+ 1' 33"
43	Rayane Bouhanni	France	+ 1' 44"
44	Michael O'Loughlin	Ireland	+ 1' 44"
45	Alexander Faglum Karlsson	Sweden	+ 1' 44"
46	Aleksander Vlasov	Russia	+ 1' 44"
47	Patrick Haller	Germany	+ 1' 44"
48	Yuriy Chsherbinin	Kazakhstan	+ 1' 44"
49	Mario Spengler	Switzerland	+ 1' 44"
50	Phil O'Donnell	United States	+ 1' 44"
51	Jan Maas	Netherlands	+ 1' 44"
52	Zeke Mostov	United States	+ 1' 44"
53	Sasu Halme	Finland	+ 1' 44"
54	Miguel Ángel Ballesteros	Spain	+ 1' 44"
55	Pierre Idjouadiene	France	+ 1' 44"

Rank	Rider	Country	Time
56	Riccardo Verza	Italy	+ 1' 48"
57	Gotzon Martin	Spain	+ 3' 36"
58	Juraj Bellan	Slovakia	+ 3' 36"
59	Rocco Fuggiano	Italy	+ 3' 38"
60	Eddie Dunbar	Ireland	+ 3' 51"
61	Nicola Conci	Italy	+ 3' 57"
62	Zan Jerkic	Slovenia	+ 4' 23"
63	Ivan Venter	South Africa	+ 4' 23"
64	Erlend Blikra	Norway	+ 4' 44"
65	Rodrigo Quirino	Brazil	+ 4' 46"
66	Hartthijs de Vries	Netherlands	+ 4' 55"
67	Matt Gibson	Great Britain	+ 5' 04"
68	José Gerardo Ulloa	Mexico	+ 5' 41"
69	Diego Sevilla	Spain	+ 5' 44"
70	Jesper Schultz	Denmark	+ 6' 19"
71	Pavlo Bondarenko	Ukraine	+ 6' 33"
72	Anders Hardahl	Denmark	+ 6' 36"
73	Gustaf Andersson	Sweden	+ 7' 05"
74	Gustav Basson	South Africa	+ 7' 05"
75	Marcel Neuhauser	Austria	+ 7' 05"
76	Javier Montoya	Colombia	+ 7' 05"
77	Niklas Larsen	Denmark	+ 7' 05"
78	Tom Wirtgen	Luxembourg	+ 7' 05"
79	Keigo Kusaba	Japan	+ 8' 22"
80	David Gaudu	France	+ 8' 27"
81	Casper Pedersen	Denmark	+ 8' 40"
82	Jean-Simon D'Anjou	Canada	+ 9' 44"
83	Patrick Gamper	Austria	+ 9' 48"
84	Grigoriy Shtein	Kazakhstan	+ 9' 48"
85	Peeter Pung	Estonia	+ 9' 48"
86	Abderrahim Zahiri	Morocco	+ 9' 48"
87	Petr Rikunov	Russia	+ 9' 48"
88	Gorazd Per	Slovenia	+ 9' 48"
89	Matic Veber	Slovenia	+ 9' 48"
90	Martin Palm	Belgium	+ 9' 48"
91	Adrien Costa	United States	+ 9' 56"
92	Stephen Shanahan	Ireland	+ 9' 56"
93	Will Barta	United States	+ 10' 14"
94	Syver Wærsted	Norway	+ 11' 35"
95	Tobias Foss	Norway	+ 11' 35"
96	Derek Gee	Canada	+ 12' 09"
97	Patryk Soliński	Poland	+ 12' 09"
98	El Mehdi Chokri	Morocco	+ 12' 54"
99	Graeme Ockhuis	South Africa	+ 15' 01"
100	Xavier Cañellas	Spain	+ 15' 22"
101	Konstyantyn Ashurov	Ukraine	+ 15' 22"
102	Torjus Sleen	Norway	+ 15' 22"
103	Alisher Zhumakan	Kazakhstan	+ 15' 22"
104	Juan Francisco Villalobos	Mexico	+ 15' 24"
105	Sven Reutter	Germany	+ 15' 24"
106	Artūrs Belēvičs	Latvia	+ 16' 56"
107	Emil Dima	Romania	+ 18' 10"
108	Jack Maddux	United States	+ 18' 23"
109	Onur Balkan	Turkey	+ 19' 33"
110	Stephen Williams	Great Britain	+ 23' 45"

=== Riders who failed to finish ===
77 riders failed to finish the race.

Rider	Country
Jonathan Brown	United States
Ben Ganon	Israel
Pier-André Côté	Canada
Aleksandrs Rubļevskis	Latvia
Valters Cakss	Latvia
Islam Mansouri	Algeria
Zoheir Benyoub	Algeria
Daniel Martínez	Colombia
Jaume Sureda	Spain
Lennard Kämna	Germany
Keisuke Nakamura	Japan
David Zverko	Slovakia
Orluis Aular	Venezuela
Dilmurdjon Siddikov	Uzbekistan
Nathan Draper	Great Britain
Rui Oliveira	Portugal
Ridion Kopshti	Albania
Facundo Crisafulli	Argentina
Gabriel Cullaigh	Great Britain
Dzmitry Zhyhunou	Belarus
Roman Lehký	Czech Republic
Ladislav Kniha	Slovakia
Huynh Thanh Tung	Vietnam
Adrián Jaramillo	Venezuela
Dawid Adamczyk	Poland
Lucian Buga	Romania
Marco-Tapio Niemi	Finland
Damien Touzé	France
André Carvalho	Portugal
Dušan Rajović	Serbia
Dylan O'Brien	Ireland
Ismael Cárdenas	Venezuela
Damian Sławek	Poland
Salvador Martínez	El Salvador
Kristian Zimany	Slovakia
Ahmed Amine Galdoune	Morocco
Nico Selenati	Switzerland
Yam Poliak	Israel
Ed Walsh	Canada

Rider	Country
Brian Carro	Uruguay
Alizada Elgün	Azerbaijan
Luka Čotar	Slovenia
Alexei Piashkun	Belarus
Itamar Einhorn	Israel
Daniel Moricz	Hungary
Tiago Antunes	Portugal
Bruno Kristić	Croatia
Daiki Magosaki	Japan
Ayman Elsayed Imam	Egypt
Akramjon Sunnatov	Uzbekistan
André Gohr	Brazil
Ekke-Kaur Vosman	Estonia
Norman Vahtra	Estonia
Kanan Gahramanli	Azerbaijan
José Yustiz	Venezuela
Ismail Bouricha	Algeria
Jon Božič	Slovenia
Gergő Gönczi	Hungary
Marius Skjolden	Norway
Nikolay Ilichev	Russia
Ilyass Rabihi	Morocco
Daire Feeley	Ireland
Niklas Henttala	Finland
Alihan Demirbağ	Turkey
Francisco Lara	Mexico
Mohamed Eleiwa Helal	Egypt
Enzo Luján	Argentina
Larry Valvasori	Luxembourg
Gordian Banzer	Liechtenstein
Alexis Alarcón	Chile
Mustafa Erikçi	Turkey
Dmitriy Ponkratov	Uzbekistan
Anton Ivashkin	Belarus
Lucas Hamilton	Australia
Realdo Ramaliu	Albania
Steff Cras	Belgium
Dušan Kalaba	Serbia
