= 2014 UCI Road World Championships =

Cycling world championships

- Venue: Ponferrada, Spain
- Date: 21–28 September 2014
- Coordinates: 42°33′N 6°35′W
- Nations participating: 68
- Events: 12

The 2014 UCI Road World Championships took place in Ponferrada, Spain, from 21 to 28 September 2014. The cycling championships consisted of 12 events for elite, under-23 and junior cyclists. It was the 81st UCI Road World Championships and the seventh time that Spain had hosted the championships; they were previously held in Lasarte in 1965, Montjuïc in 1973, Barcelona in 1984, Benidorm in 1992, San Sebastián in 1997 and Madrid in 2005.

== Bidding process ==
The UCI announced on 4 April 2011 that the city of Ponferrada had the best candidature file to host the Championships. The candidature file of Ponferrada had the best score on the important sporting and economic elements. Ponferrada had unsuccessfully bid for the 2013 World Championships, which were awarded to Tuscany. Other candidates for the 2014 Championships were Hooglede-Gits in Belgium, Chihuahua in Mexico and the Vendée region in France.

== Preparations ==
Sponsors of the Championships
Main event partners:

- Mapei
- Junta de Castilla y León

- Tissot
- Shimano
- Movistar
- Santini SMS
- Tacx
- Loterias y Apuestas del Estado
- Nautalia

- Gadis
- Coca-Cola
- Santander
- Kyocera
- Embutidos Pajariel

Media partners:

- Marca
- Televisión Española
- El Mundo
- Ciclismo a Fondo
- Expansión

- RFEC
- Ayuntamiento de Ponferrada
- CSD
- Fundacion Mundial Ciclismo Ponferrada 2014
- Diputación de León
- Aemet

The original plan was to have two different finish sections, one for the road races and one for an uphill time trial. The idea was later discarded because it was not possible from a logistical and financial point of view.

Unpaid volunteers will perform a variety of tasks before and during the Championships. A target of 1000 volunteers was set with a maximum of 1400. When recruitment started begin April 2014, 200 applications were received within the first day. As of 16 September 1186 volunteers were recruited.

On 11 July the official anthem of the Championships was announced titled Song-G Ponferrada 2014 written by Bierzo band Rapabestas. Tickets for the Championships to sit near the finish line could be bought in advance. Day passes were available for €60–80 and special packages were available for more days. The Italian company Erreà was made responsible to develop and distribute the official merchandising, from which a percentage of sales will go towards funding the event.

=== Costs ===
The city council of Ponferrada estimated that at the end of April, €12.42 million had been spent on organizing the championships, an amount that could reach €14 million by the end of September. About €4.8 million comes from sponsors, merchandising and contributing hotels and several more millions will come from other contracts. The organization of championships has an overall budget of €11 million; organisers have to pay €5 million to the UCI for organizing the championships and €6 million are used for the organization and logistics. The Provincial Council of León invested €323,181 to upgrade Ponferrada and make the city ready for the championships.

According to media reports in March 2015, the championships failed to make a profit, with estimates for losses ranging from €2.7 to €9 million.

== Qualification ==
Main qualification was based on performances on the UCI events during 2014. Results from January to the middle of August counted towards the qualification criteria, with the rankings being determined upon the release of the numerous tour rankings on 15 August 2014.

== Participating nations ==
Cyclists from 68 national federations competed. Apart from these nations, one rider from Namibia competed in the men's team time trial. Rider from the Dominican Republic and Turkmenisten were registered but did not compete. The number of cyclists per nation that competed, excluding riders in the team time trials, is shown in parentheses.

Participating national federations
Click on a nation to go to the nations' UCI Road World Championships page
- Albania (4)
- Algeria (7)
- Argentina (7)
- Australia (29)
- Austria (18)
- Azerbaijan (6)
- Belarus (11)
- Belgium (35)
- Brazil (12)
- Canada (16)
- Chile (4)
- Colombia (23)
- Costa Rica (2)
- Croatia (7)
- Czech Republic (7)
- Denmark (23)
- Ecuador (2)
- Egypt (4)
- El Salvador (1)
- Eritrea (7)
- Estonia (11)
- Finland (6)
- France (37)
- Germany (38)
- Great Britain (32)
- Greece (3)
- Honduras (1)
- Hungary (7)
- Ireland (13)
- Israel (5)
- Italy (37)
- Japan (11)
- Kazakhstan (20)
- Latvia (10)
- Liechtenstein (1)
- Lithuania (9)
- Luxembourg (8)
- North Macedonia (3)
- Mauritius (1)
- Mexico (11)
- Moldova (2)
- Morocco (12)
- Netherlands (34)
- New Zealand (10)
- Norway (21)
- Paraguay (1)
- Poland (31)
- Portugal (15)
- Qatar (1)
- Romania (9)
- Russia (32)
- Rwanda (3)
- Saint Kitts and Nevis (1)
- Serbia (4)
- Singapore (1)
- Slovakia (12)
- Slovenia (23)
- South Africa (16)
- Spain (32) (host)
- Sweden (17)
- Switzerland (24)
- Turkey (11)
- Ukraine (15)
- United States (29)
- Uruguay (1)
- Uzbekistan (6)
- Venezuela (12)
- Vietnam (1)

== Schedule ==
All events will start and finish in Ponferrada. All times are in Central European Time (UTC+1).

Date	Timings		Event	Distance	
Team time trial events
21 September	10:00	11:25	Women's teams	36.15 km (22.46 mi)	
21 September	14:00	17:05	Men's teams	57.10 km (35.48 mi)	
Individual time trial events
22 September	10:00	11:30	Junior women	13.90 km (8.64 mi)	
22 September	14:00	16:35	Under-23 men	36.15 km (22.46 mi)	
23 September	10:00	12:40	Junior men	29.50 km (18.33 mi)	
23 September	14:00	16:45	Elite women	29.50 km (18.33 mi)	
24 September	13:30	17:00	Elite men	47.10 km (29.27 mi)	
Road race events					Laps
26 September	09:00	11:10	Junior women	72.80 km (45.24 mi)	4
26 September	13:00	17:40	Under-23 men	182.00 km (113.09 mi)	10
27 September	09:00	12:15	Junior men	127.40 km (79.16 mi)	7
27 September	14:00	17:20	Elite women	127.40 km (79.16 mi)	7
28 September	10:00	16:35	Elite men	254.80 km (158.33 mi)	14

== Events summary ==
=== Elite events ===
Event	Gold		Silver		Bronze	
Men's Events
Men's road race	(Poland) Michał Kwiatkowski (POL)	6h 29' 07"	(Australia) Simon Gerrans (AUS)	+ 1"	(Spain) Alejandro Valverde (ESP)	+ 1"
Men's time trial	(United Kingdom) Bradley Wiggins (GBR)	56' 25.52"	(Germany) Tony Martin (DEU)	+ 26.23"	(Netherlands) Tom Dumoulin (NED)	+ 40.64"
Men's team time trial	(United States) BMC Racing Team	1h 03' 29.85"	(Australia) Orica–GreenEDGE	+ 31.84"	(Belgium) Omega Pharma–Quick-Step	+ 35.22"
Men's team time trial	(Australia) Rohan Dennis (AUS) (Switzerland) Silvan Dillier (SUI) (Italy) Daniel Oss (ITA) (Italy) Manuel Quinziato (ITA) (United States) Tejay van Garderen (USA) (Slovakia) Peter Velits (SVK)	1h 03' 29.85"	(Australia) Luke Durbridge (AUS) (Australia) Michael Hepburn (AUS) (Australia) Damien Howson (AUS) (Australia) Brett Lancaster (AUS) (Netherlands) Jens Mouris (NED) (Canada) Svein Tuft (CAN)	+ 31.84"	(Belgium) Tom Boonen (BEL) (Poland) Michał Kwiatkowski (POL) (Germany) Tony Martin (DEU) (Belgium) Pieter Serry (BEL) (Netherlands) Niki Terpstra (NED) (Belgium) Julien Vermote (BEL)	+ 35.22"
Women's Events
Women's road race	(France) Pauline Ferrand-Prévot (FRA)	3h 29' 21"	(Germany) Lisa Brennauer (DEU)	s.t.	(Sweden) Emma Johansson (SWE)	s.t.
Women's time trial	(Germany) Lisa Brennauer (DEU)	38' 48.16"	(Ukraine) Hanna Solovey (UKR)	+ 18.68"	(United States) Evelyn Stevens (USA)	+ 21.25"
Women's team time trial	(United States) Specialized–lululemon	43' 33.35"	(Australia) Orica–AIS	+ 1' 17.56"	(Italy) Astana BePink	+ 2' 19.64"
Women's team time trial	(Netherlands) Chantal Blaak (NED) (Germany) Lisa Brennauer (DEU) (Canada) Karol-Ann Canuel (CAN) (United States) Carmen Small (USA) (United States) Evelyn Stevens (USA) (Germany) Trixi Worrack (DEU)	43' 33.35"	(Australia) Annette Edmondson (AUS) (Australia) Melissa Hoskins (AUS) (Sweden) Emma Johansson (SWE) (Australia) Jessie MacLean (AUS) (Italy) Valentina Scandolara (ITA) (Australia) Amanda Spratt (AUS)	+ 1' 17.56"	(Belarus) Alena Amialiusik (BLR) (Italy) Simona Frapporti (ITA) (Switzerland) Doris Schweizer (SUI) (United States) Alison Tetrick (USA) (Italy) Silvia Valsecchi (ITA) (Italy) Susanna Zorzi (ITA)	+ 2' 19.64"

=== Under-23 events ===
Event	Gold		Silver		Bronze	
Men's Under-23 Events
Men's under-23 road race	(Norway) Sven Erik Bystrøm (NOR)	4h 32' 39"	(Australia) Caleb Ewan (AUS)	+ 7"	(Norway) Kristoffer Skjerping (NOR)	+ 7"
Men's under-23 time trial	(Australia) Campbell Flakemore (AUS)	43' 49.94"	(Republic of Ireland) Ryan Mullen (IRL)	+ 0.48"	(Switzerland) Stefan Küng (SUI)	+ 9.22"

=== Junior events ===
Event	Gold		Silver		Bronze	
Men's Juniors Events
Men's junior road race	(Germany) Jonas Bokeloh (DEU)	3h 07' 00"	(Russia) Alexandr Kulikovskiy (RUS)	s.t.	(Netherlands) Peter Lenderink (NED)	s.t.
Men's junior time trial	(Germany) Lennard Kämna (DEU)	36' 13.49"	(United States) Adrien Costa (USA)	+ 44.66"	(Australia) Michael Storer (AUS)	+ 58.11"
Women's Juniors Events
Women's junior road race	(Denmark) Amalie Dideriksen (DEN)	2h 02' 59"	(Italy) Sofia Bertizzolo (ITA)	s.t.	(Poland) Agnieszka Skalniak (POL)	s.t.
Women's junior time trial	(Australia) Macey Stewart (AUS)	20' 08.39"	(Denmark) Pernille Mathiesen (DEN)	+ 10.79"	(Australia) Anna-Leeza Hull (AUS)	+ 13.31"

== Medal table ==
Place	Nation	1st place, gold medalist(s)	2nd place, silver medalist(s)	3rd place, bronze medalist(s)	Total
1	Germany	3	2	0	5
2	Australia	2	4	2	8
3	United States	2	1	1	4
4	Denmark	1	1	0	2
5	Norway	1	0	1	2
5	Poland	1	0	1	2
7	France	1	0	0	1
7	Slovakia	1	0	0	1
7	Great Britain	1	0	0	1
9	Italy	0	1	1	2
10	Ireland	0	1	0	1
10	Russia	0	1	0	1
10	Ukraine	0	1	0	1
13	Netherlands	0	0	2	2
14	Spain	0	0	1	1
14	Sweden	0	0	1	1
14	Switzerland	0	0	1	1
14	Belgium	0	0	1	1
Total		12	12	12	36

== Courses ==
=== Team time trial ===
The course for the Women's Race is 36.15 km (22.46 mi) and 57.10 km (35.48 mi) for the Men's Race. The team time trial starts in the centre of Ponferrada and will go via La Martina, Posada del Bierzo, Carracedelo and Cacabelos back to Ponferrada. The total incline of the women's course is 198 m (650 ft). A few kilometres before the finish there is a climb with an elevation of over 100 m (330 ft) and a maximum inclination of 7%. The men face a few small climbs during the course with a total of 386 m (1,266 ft) of climbing and a maximum incline of 10%.

=== Individual time trial ===
The initial plan was to have a time trial finishing uphill. This idea was discarded because it was required to have two finish sections which was not possible from a logistical and financial point of view.

The length of the individual time trials varies between 13.90 km (8.64 mi) for junior women and 47.10 km (29.27 mi) for elite men. All courses will start and finish in Ponferrada and will run through La Martina, Posada del Bierzo and Carracedelo. A short stretch before riding into Ponferrada was made for the championships. Except for the elite men's course, all courses are quite flat until a steep climb a few kilometres before the finish with an incline of over 100 m (330 ft) and a maximum inclination of 7% a few kilometres before the finish line.

The total elevation over the elite men's course is 458 m (1,503 ft) with a few hills in the last 15 km (9.3 mi) with a maximum inclination of 10%. The course starts with a flat section of 30 km (19 mi) through the valley of Bierzo, before the parcours goes slightly up. In a little under 10 km (6.2 mi) the riders rise from 550 m (1,800 ft) to an altitude of 700 m (2,300 ft). The ascent overlaps partly with the road race for men, which means the steepest part has a negative gradient of 16%. After 40 km (25 mi) there is another climb. In a few kilometres the riders will reach the highest point in the route, located at 709 m (2,326 ft) after 43 km (27 mi). The rest of the course is going downhill.

=== Road race ===
The road races of all events will be on the same circuit. The circuit is 18.20 km (11.31 mi) and includes two hills. The total climbing is 306 m (1,004 ft) per lap and the maximum incline is 10.7%.

The first 4 km (2.5 mi) are flat, after which starts the climb to Alto de Montearenas with an average gradient of 8%. After a few hundred metres the ascent flattens and the remaining 5.1 km (3.2 mi) are at an average gradient of 3.5%. Next is a descent, with the steepest after 11 km (6.8 mi) with a 16% negative gradient.

Alto de Compostilla is a short climb of 1.1 km (0.68 mi), at an average gradient is 6.5% with some of the steepest parts are 11%. The remaining distance of 4.5 km (2.8 mi) is almost completely going down.

== Prize money ==
The UCI assigned premiums in all of the twelve events, with a total prize money of €179,805. In the individual time trials and road races the top 3 finishers win prize money and in the team time trials the top 5 teams.

The prize money in the road races is about twice as high as in the time trials for each category. About 60% of the prize money goes to the three elite men events and 28% to the elite women's. 61% of the prize money is awarded in the team time trials, 26% in the road races and 13% in the time trials.

	Rank	Men elites	Women elites	Men U23	Men juniors	Women juniors	Total
Road races	1	€7,667	€7,667	€3,833	€1,533	€1,533	€22,233
Road races	2	€5,367	€5,367	€2,683	€1,150	€1,150	€15,717
Road races	3	€3,067	€3,067	€1,533	€767	€767	€9,201
Road races	Total	€16,101	€16,101	€8,049	€3,450	€3,450	€47,151
Time trials	1	€3,833	€3,833	€3,067	€767	€767	€12,267
Time trials	2	€2,300	€2,300	€1,533	€383	€383	€6,899
Time trials	3	€1,633	€1,633	€767	€230	€230	€4,493
Time trials	Total	€7,766	€7,766	€5,367	€1,380	€1,380	€23,659
Team time trials	1	€33,333	€10,666	N/A			€43,999
Team time trials	2	€20,833	€6,666	N/A			€27,499
Team time trials	3	€16,666	€4,166	N/A			€20,832
Team time trials	4	€8,333	€2,500	N/A			€10,833
Team time trials	5	€4,166	€1,666	N/A			€5,832
Team time trials	Total	€83,331	€25,664	N/A			€108,995
Total		€107,198	€49,531	€13,416	€4,830	€4,830	€179,805

== Broadcasting ==
- Africa (French speaking): BeIN Sports
- Andorra: BeIN Sports
- Australia: SBS Australia
- Austria: ORF
- Belgium: RTBF, VRT
- Bosnia: SportKlub
- Brazil: Globosat
- Canada: RDS, Rogers Sportsnet
- Croatia: SportKlub
- Czech Republic: Czech TV
- Denmark: Viasat
- Estonia: Viasat
- Finland: Viasat
- France: France TV, BeIN Sports
- Germany: Das Erste
- Hungary: Sport 1
- India: Sport 1
- Israel: Charlton
- Italy: RAI
- Japan: NHK
- Kosovo: SportKlub
- Latvia: Viasat
- Lithuania: Viasat
- Macedonia: SportKlub
- Malaysia: ASTRO
- Mexico: SKY México
- Middle East: Al Jazeera
- Monaco: BeIN Sports
- Montenegro: SportKlub
- Netherlands: NOS
- New-Zealand: Sky New-Zealand
- Norway: Viasat
- PAN Africa: SuperSport
- PAN South America: Direct TV
- Poland: Polsat
- Portugal: RTP 2
- Romania: Pro TV
- Serbia: SportKlub
- Slovakia: Slovak TV
- Slovenia: SportKlub
- Spain: TVE (international broadcast signal)
- Sweden: Viasat
- Switzerland: SRG SSR
- United Kingdom: BBC Television
- United States: Universal Sports
- Worldwide: SNTV, Perform

== See also ==
- 2014 in men's road cycling
- 2014 in women's road cycling
