= 2014 UCI Road World Championships – Women's time trial =

Women's time trial
2014 UCI Road World Championships
- Time trial Rainbow jersey

Race details
- Dates: 23 September 2014
- Stages: 1
- Distance: 29.50 km (18.33 mi)
- Winning time: 38' 48"

Medalists
	Gold	Lisa Brennauer (GER)
	Silver	Hanna Solovey (UKR)
	Bronze	Evelyn Stevens (USA)

The Women's time trial of the 2014 UCI Road World Championships took place in and around Ponferrada, Spain on 23 September 2014. The course of the race is 29.50 km (18.33 mi) with the start and finish in Ponferrada. Ellen van Dijk was the defending champion, after winning her first world time trial title in 2013.

Germany's Lisa Brennauer won the world title, becoming the third German rider to do so after Judith Arndt and Hanka Kupfernagel. Brennauer was victorious by 18.68 seconds over the Ukraine's Hanna Solovey, with Evelyn Stevens a further 2.57 seconds behind in the bronze medal position for the United States. Van Dijk, the defending champion, could do no better than seventh place in the final standings, over a minute in arrears of Brennauer.

== Qualification ==
All National Federations were allowed to enter four riders for the race, with a maximum of two riders to start. In addition to this number, the outgoing World Champion and the current continental champions were also able to take part.

Champion	Name	Note
Outgoing World Champion	Ellen van Dijk (NED)	
Pan American Champion	Evelyn Stevens (USA)	
European Champion (under-23)	Mieke Kröger (GER)	
African Champion	Ashleigh Moolman (RSA)	Did not participate
Asian Champion	Na Ah-reum (KOR)	Did not participate
Oceanian Champion	Shara Gillow (AUS)	Did not participate

== Course ==
The course of the women's time trial was 29.50 km (18.33 mi) in length. The time trial started in the centre of Ponferrada and passed through La Martina, Posada del Bierzo and Carracedelo before returning to Ponferrada. The total incline of the course was 172 m (564 ft). A few kilometres before the finish there was a climb, with an incline of over 100 m (330 ft) and a maximum inclination of 7%. A short stretch before riding into Ponferrada was made for the championships.

== Schedule ==
All times are in Central European Time (UTC+1).

Date	Time	Event
23 September 2014	14:00–16:45	Women's time trial
23 September 2014	17:05	Victory ceremony

== Participating nations ==
47 cyclists (from a start list of 49 riders) from 30 nations took part in the women's time trial. The number of cyclists per nation is shown in parentheses.

- Australia (1)
- Austria (2)
- Belgium (1)
- Brazil (1)
- Canada (2)
- Colombia (1)
- Croatia (1)
- Czech Republic (1)
- Denmark (1)
- Estonia (1)
- Finland (2)
- France (2)
- Germany (3)
- Greece (1)
- Italy (2)
- Japan (2)
- Latvia (2)
- Lithuania (2)
- Luxembourg (1)
- Mexico (2)
- Netherlands (2)
- New Zealand (1)
- Poland (2)
- Portugal (1)
- Russia (2)
- South Africa (1)
- Spain (2) (host)
- Switzerland (1)
- Ukraine (2)
- United States (2)

== Prize money ==
The UCI assigned premiums for the top 3 finishers, with a total prize money of €7,766.

Position	1st	2nd	3rd	Total
Amount	€3,833	€2,300	€1,633	€7,766

== Final classification ==
Rank	Rider	Country	Time
1	Lisa Brennauer	Germany	38' 48"
2	Hanna Solovey	Ukraine	+ 18"
3	Evelyn Stevens	United States	+ 21"
4	Mieke Kröger	Germany	+ 38"
5	Ann-Sophie Duyck	Belgium	+ 45"
6	Karol-Ann Canuel	Canada	+ 51"
7	Ellen van Dijk	Netherlands	+ 1' 11"
8	Alison Powers	United States	+ 1' 14"
9	Linda Villumsen	New Zealand	+ 1' 14"
10	Trixi Worrack	Germany	+ 1' 15"
11	Katrin Garfoot	Australia	+ 1' 23"
12	Martina Sáblíková	Czech Republic	+ 1' 25"
13	Chantal Blaak	Netherlands	+ 1' 35"
14	Eri Yonamine	Japan	+ 2' 06"
15	Elisa Longo Borghini	Italy	+ 2' 14"
16	Tatiana Antoshina	Russia	+ 2' 27"
17	Sérika Gulumá	Colombia	+ 2' 29"
18	Mayuko Hagiwara	Japan	+ 2' 30"
19	Eugenia Bujak	Poland	+ 2' 33"
20	Tatyana Riabchenko	Ukraine	+ 2' 37"
21	Julie Leth	Denmark	+ 2' 42"
22	Rossella Ratto	Italy	+ 2' 57"
23	Audrey Cordon	France	+ 3' 01"
24	Doris Schweizer	Switzerland	+ 3' 09"
25	Christine Majerus	Luxembourg	+ 3' 30"
26	Lija Laizāne	Latvia	+ 3' 34"
27	Leah Kirchmann	Canada	+ 3' 35"
28	Lotta Lepistö	Finland	+ 3' 40"
29	Mia Radotić	Croatia	+ 3' 48"
30	Martina Ritter	Austria	+ 3' 59"
31	Sari Saarelainen	Finland	+ 4' 04"
32	Belén López	Spain	+ 4' 11"
33	Daiva Tušlaitė	Lithuania	+ 4' 16"
34	Lourdes Oyarbide	Spain	+ 4' 27"
35	Dana Rožlapa	Latvia	+ 4' 35"
36	Aude Biannic	France	+ 4' 38"
37	Ana Teresa Casas	Mexico	+ 4' 39"
38	Jacqueline Hahn	Austria	+ 4' 40"
39	Kataržina Sosna	Lithuania	+ 4' 49"
40	Alexandra Burchenkova	Russia	+ 4' 55"
41	Liisi Rist	Estonia	+ 5' 03"
42	Katarzyna Pawłowska	Poland	+ 5' 14"
43	Heidi Dalton	South Africa	+ 5' 43"
44	Verónica Leal	Mexico	+ 5' 44"
45	Varvara Fasoi	Greece	+ 6' 04"
46	Clemilda Fernandes	Brazil	+ 6' 15"
47	Daniela Reis	Portugal	+ 7' 48"
DNS	An-Li Kachelhoffer	South Africa	-
DNS	Carmen Small	United States	-
