= Gábor Fejes =

Hungarian cyclist

Personal information
- Born: 25 May 1989 (age 37) Hungary

Cycling career
- Sport: Cycling
- Current team: CK Spartak Tlmače
- Discipline: Road
- Role: Rider

Amateur teams
- 2011–2012: Bátorfi–Agria KTK
- 2013: Spirit Hotel Freeriderz
- 2014–2017: Dr. Bátorfi–Agria KTK
- 2018–: CK Spartak Tlmače

Professional team
- 2010: Betonexpressz 2000–Universal Caffé

Gábor Fejes (born 25 May 1989) is a Hungarian racing cyclist. He rode at the 2014 UCI Road World Championships.

== Major results ==
2008
1st Time trial, National Under-23 Road Championships
2009
National Under-23 Road Championships

1st Time trial
2nd Road race

2010
1st Time trial, National Under-23 Road Championships
2011
1st Time trial, National Road Championships
1st Stage 1 Tour of Pécs
7th Memorial Davide Fardelli
2012
National Road Championships

1st Time trial
2nd Road race

7th Overall Tour de Serbie
2013
1st Time trial, National Road Championships
2014
National Road Championships

1st Time trial
5th Road race

2016
5th Time trial, National Road Championships
2017
4th Time trial, National Road Championships
2018
2nd Time trial, National Road Championships
2020
3rd Road race, National Road Championships
