= Sven Reutter =

German road cyclist

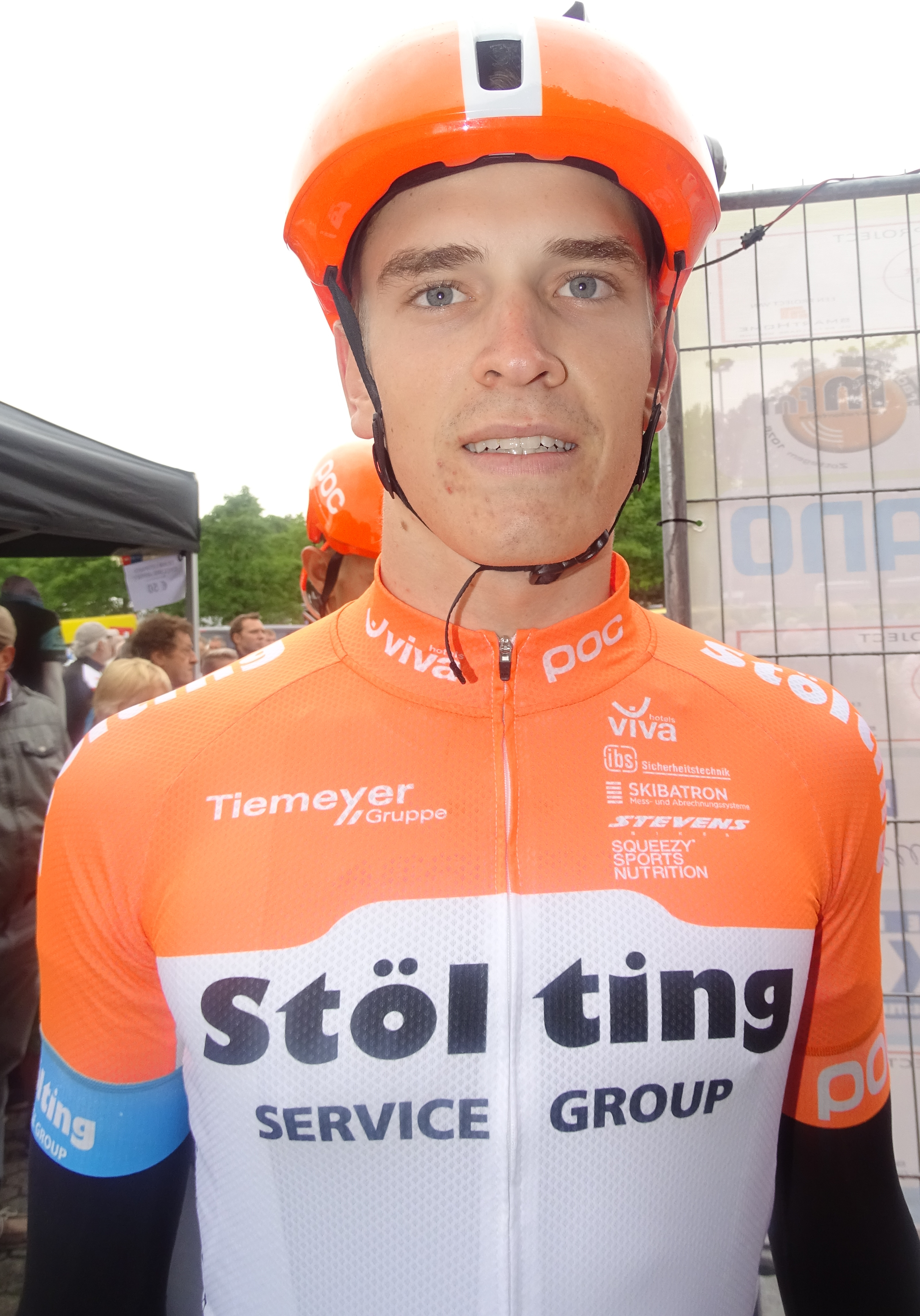
- Reutter in 2015

Personal information
- Full name: Sven Reutter
- Born: 13 August 1996 (age 30) Germany
- Height: 1.8 m (5 ft 11 in)
- Weight: 72 kg (159 lb)

Cycling career
- Sport: Cycling
- Current team: Retired
- Discipline: Road
- Role: Rider

Amateur teams
- 2009–2014: RWV Wendelsheim
- 2013: GHOST–Junior-Team Württemberg
- 2014: LV Württemberg-Junioren BL Team

Professional teams
- 2015–2016: Team Stölting
- 2017–2018: Rad-Net Rose Team

Sven Reutter (born 13 August 1996) is a German former professional cyclist, who rode professionally between 2015 and 2018.

== Major results ==
2014
1st Overall Internationale Niedersachsen-Rundfahrt der Radsport-Junioren
2nd Time trial, National Junior Road Championships
7th Time trial, UCI Junior Road World Championships
