= Peter Lenderink =

Dutch cyclist

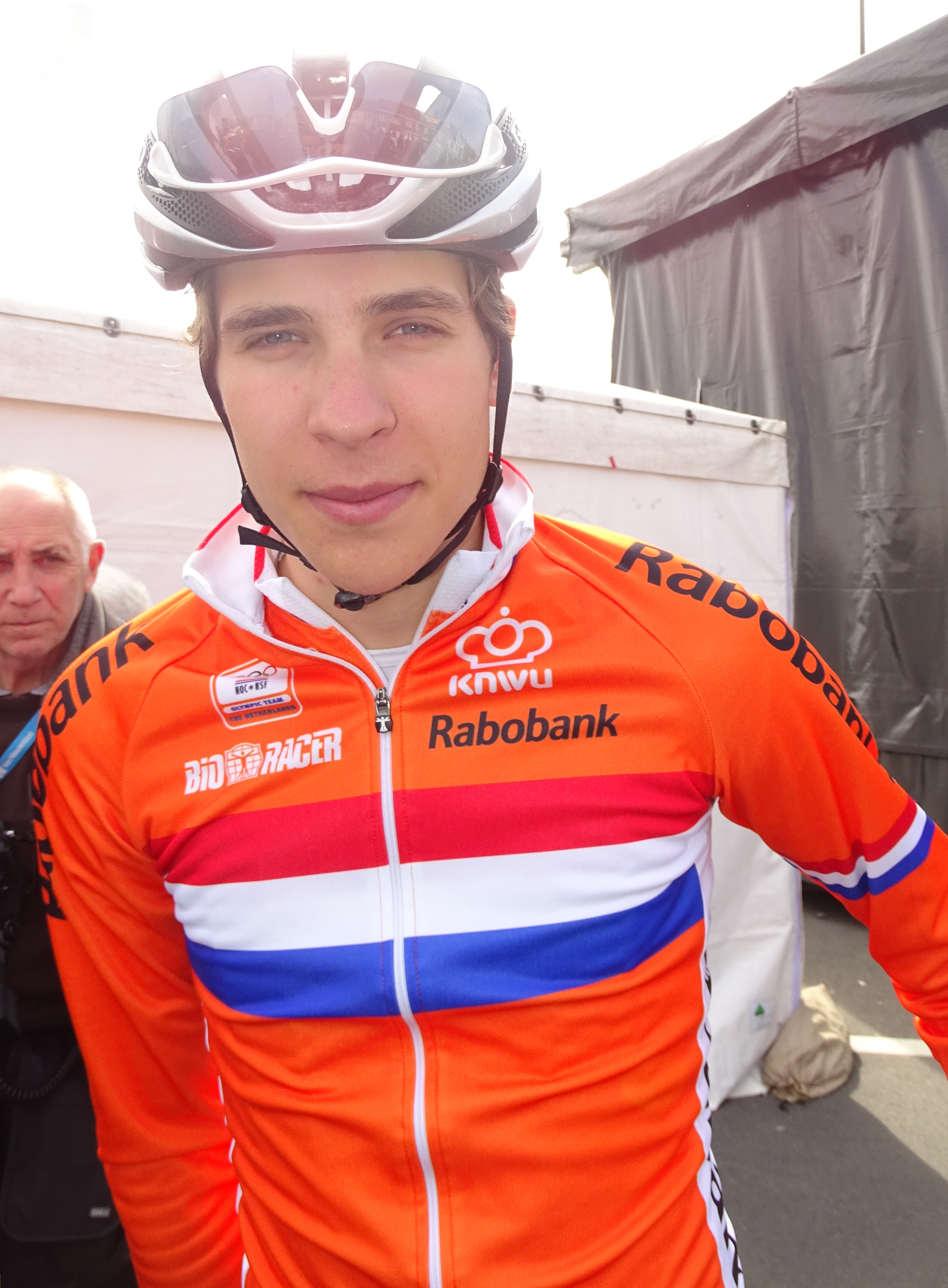
- Lenderink in 2016

Personal information
- Full name: Peter Lenderink
- Born: 11 February 1996 (age 30) Hardenberg, the Netherlands

Cycling career
- Sport: Cycling
- Current team: Retired
- Discipline: Road
- Role: Rider

Professional teams
- 2015–2016: Rabobank Development Team
- 2017–2018: SEG Racing Academy

Peter Lenderink (born 11 February 1996) is a Dutch former road cyclist. As a junior he won the bronze medal at the 2014 UCI Road World Championships in the Men's junior road race.

He retired from the sport in July 2018, after competing professionally for four years.

== Major results ==
2014
1st Overall Driedaagse van Axel
3rd Road race, UCI Junior Road World Championships
2016
6th Overall Paris–Arras Tour
