= Coppa dei Laghi-Trofeo Almar =

Italian cycling competition

Race details
- Date: July
- Region: Italy
- Discipline: Road race
- Competition: UCI Under 23 Nations' Cup
- Type: One day race
- Web site: cyclingsportpromotion.com/en/event/trofeo-almar/

History
- First edition: 2015
- Editions: 6
- Final edition: 2019
- First winner: Gianni Moscon (ITA)
- Most wins: No repeat winners
- Final winner: Alexandr Kulikovskiy (RUS)

The Coppa dei Laghi-Trofeo Almar was a one-day cycling race held in Italy from 2015 to 2019. It was on the UCI Under 23 Nations' Cup calendar as a category 1.Ncup event in 2015 and 0216, before dropping down to the national amateur calendar.

== Winners ==
Year	Country	Rider	Team
2015	Italy	Gianni Moscon	Italy (national team)
2016	Russia	Alexandr Kulikovskiy	Russia (national team)
2017	Italy	Simone Bevilacqua	Zalf–Euromobil–Désirée–Fior
2018	Italy	Edoardo Affini	SEG Racing Academy
2019	Italy	Alessandro Covi	Team Colpack
