= Grand Prix du Portugal =

Race details
- Date: March–April
- Region: Portugal
- Discipline: Road race
- Competition: UCI Europe Tour
- Type: Stage race
- Web site: web.archive.org/web/20111001191306/http://www.pad.pt/Site/

History
- First edition: 2007
- Editions: 4
- Final edition: 2010
- First winner: Vítor Rodrigues (POR)
- Most wins: Vítor Rodrigues (POR) (2 wins)
- Final winner: Tom Dumoulin (NED)

The Grand Prix du Portugal was a cycling race held annually in Portugal. It is part of the UCI Europe Tour in category 2.ncup, as it was part of the UCI Under 23 Nations' Cup.

== Winners ==
Year	Country	Rider	Team
2007	Portugal	Vítor Rodrigues	
2008	Portugal	Vítor Rodrigues	
2009	Colombia	Sergio Henao	
2010	Netherlands	Tom Dumoulin	
