= Silvan Dillier =

Swiss cyclist (born 1990)

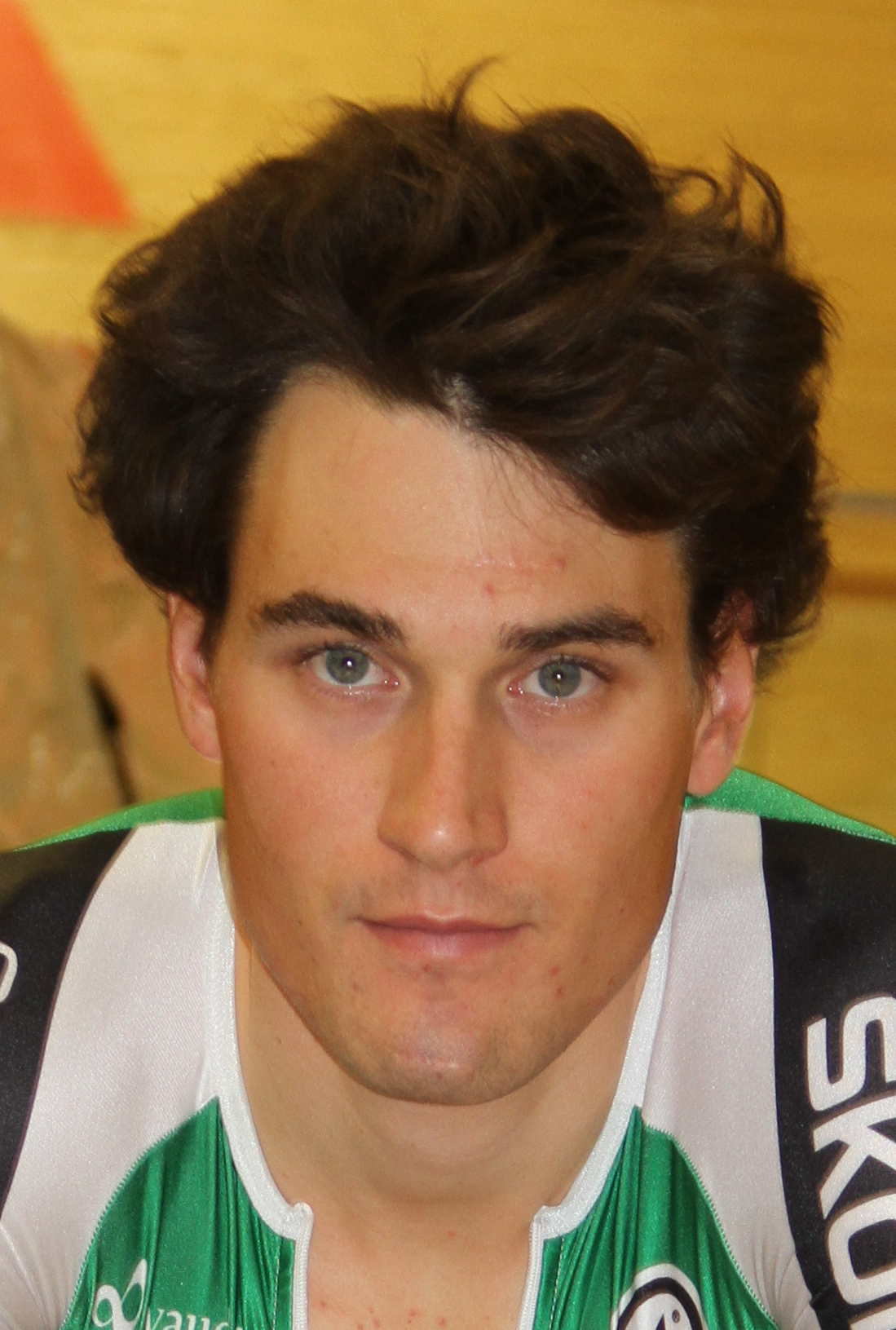
- Dillier at the 2015 UCI Track Cycling World Championships

Personal information
- Full name: Silvan Dillier
- Born: 3 August 1990 (age 36) Baden, Switzerland
- Height: 1.83 m (6 ft 0 in)
- Weight: 75 kg (165 lb; 11 st 11 lb)

Cycling career
- Sport: Cycling
- Current team: Alpecin–Premier Tech
- Disciplines: Road; Track
- Role: Rider
- Rider type: Classics specialist, domestique

Amateur teams
- 2010: Chambéry Cyclisme
- 2012: EKZ Racing
- 2013: BMC Development Team
- 2013: BMC Racing Team (stagiaire)

Professional teams
- 2011: Team Vorarlberg
- 2014–2017: BMC Racing Team
- 2018–2020: AG2R La Mondiale
- 2021–: Alpecin–Fenix

Major wins
- Grand Tours Giro d'Italia 1 individual stage (2017) One-day races and Classics National Road Race Championships (2017, 2021) National Time Trial Championships (2015)
Medal record
Men's road bicycle racing
Representing BMC Racing Team
World Championships
Gold medal – first place	2014 Ponferranda	Team time trial
Gold medal – first place	2015 Richmond	Team time trial
Silver medal – second place	2017 Bergen	Team time trial

Silvan Dillier (born 3 August 1990) is a Swiss cyclist, who currently rides for UCI WorldTeam Alpecin–Premier Tech.

== Career ==
=== Amateur career ===
Dillier was born in Baden, Switzerland. In 2008, he was the Swiss national junior time trial champion, Under-23 road champion in 2009, and Under-23 time trial champion in 2010 and 2011.

In 2012, he won a stage at the Tour de l'Avenir.

In the 2013 Tour of Alberta, he won stage 2 while riding with BMC Racing Team as a stagiaire. This prompted BMC to sign him to a contract for the 2014 cycling season.

=== BMC Racing Team (2014–17) ===
He was named in the startlist for the 2016 Vuelta a España. Dillier rode in the 2017 Giro d'Italia. and won Stage 6 in a two-man sprint against Jasper Stuyven (Trek–Segafredo) after the pair had been part of a five-man breakaway that rode clear of the peloton for almost all of the 217-kilometre (135-mile) stage. In June 2017, Dillier won his first stage race, the Route du Sud.

=== AG2R La Mondiale (2018–20) ===
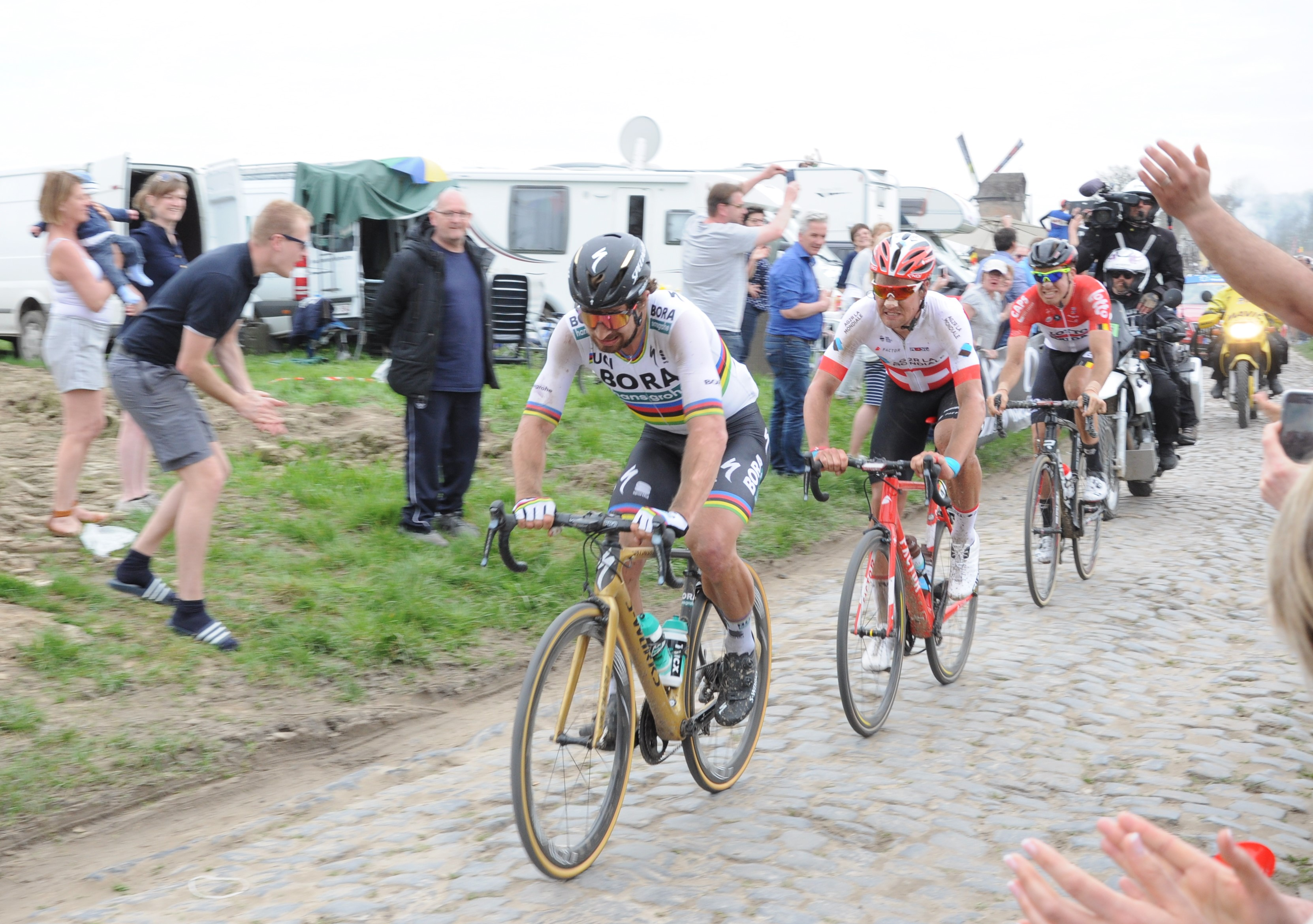
Dillier (centre) following Peter Sagan at the 2018 Paris–Roubaix; he ultimately finished second to Sagan in a sprint finish.

Dillier joined AG2R La Mondiale for the 2018 season to bolster the team's classics squad, but he suffered a broken thumb at Strade Bianche. He returned to racing in April 2018 and won his comeback race, Route Adélie. At Paris–Roubaix, Dillier was part of a nine-man early breakaway that escaped from the peloton after an hour of racing, and was leading with Jelle Wallays (Lotto–Soudal), until the pair were caught by world champion Peter Sagan (Bora–Hansgrohe), who had attacked from the group of favourites with around 53 kilometres (33 miles) remaining. Dillier was able to stay and work with Sagan all the way to the finish at Roubaix Velodrome, where Sagan won the two-up sprint finish. In July 2018, he was named in the start list for the Tour de France.

=== Alpecin–Fenix (2021–) ===
In November 2020, Dillier signed a one-year contract with the Alpecin–Fenix team, for the 2021 season. He extended his contract by a further two seasons in July 2021.

Diller became known as a reliable domestique for Mathieu van der Poel. At Milan-Sanremo, he would regularly ride approximately 200 km, often unassisted by other teams, at the front of the peloton.

== Personal life ==
Dillier resides in Schneisingen.

== Major results ==
=== Road ===
2006
1st Road race, National Novice Road Championships
2007
1st Stage 3 Kroz Istru
2nd Time trial, National Junior Road Championships
2nd Overall Tour du Pays de Vaud

1st Stage 3a

9th Overall Course de la Paix Juniors

1st Stage 4

2008
1st Time trial, National Junior Road Championships
8th Overall Tour du Pays de Vaud
2009
1st Road race, National Under-23 Road Championships
2010
1st Time trial, National Under-23 Road Championships
8th Overall Tour du Loir-et-Cher
2011
National Under-23 Road Championships

1st Time trial
2nd Road race

2012
National Under-23 Road Championships

1st Time trial
2nd Road race

1st Stage 1 Tour de l'Avenir
8th Overall Tour de Gironde
2013 (1 pro win)
1st Overall Tour de Normandie

1st Young rider classification

1st Flèche Ardennaise
1st Stage 2 Tour of Alberta
2nd Grand Prix des Marbriers
9th Internationale Wielertrofee Jong Maar Moedig
2014
1st Team time trial, UCI Road World Championships
2nd Grand Prix of Aargau Canton
3rd Time trial, National Road Championships
3rd Overall Tour de Wallonie

1st Young rider classification

6th Overall Driedaagse van West-Vlaanderen
9th Vattenfall Cyclassics
2015 (2)
1st Team time trial, UCI Road World Championships
1st Time trial, National Road Championships
2nd Overall Arctic Race of Norway

1st Young rider classification
1st Stage 4

2016
4th Overall Dubai Tour
8th Grand Prix of Aargau Canton
2017 (3)
National Road Championships

1st Road race
2nd Time trial

1st Overall Route du Sud

1st Points classification
1st Mountains classification

1st Stage 6 Giro d'Italia
2nd Team time trial, UCI Road World Championships
2nd Dwars door West-Vlaanderen
8th Overall Tour of Guangxi
8th Brabantse Pijl
2018 (1)
1st Route Adélie
1st Mountains classification, Tour of Guangxi
2nd Time trial, National Road Championships
2nd Paris–Roubaix
6th Tour du Doubs
9th Grand Prix of Aargau Canton
10th La Roue Tourangelle
2020
2nd Time trial, National Road Championships
10th Overall Tour Poitou-Charentes en Nouvelle-Aquitaine
2021 (1)
1st Road race, National Road Championships

==== Grand Tour general classification results timeline ====
Grand Tour	2015	2016	2017	2018	2019	2020	2021	2022	2023	2024	2025	2026
Giro d'Italia	52	DNF	67	—	—	—	—	—	—	—	—	
Tour de France	—	—	—	83	—	—	59	60	129	126	131	
Vuelta a España	—	79	—	—	72	—	—	—	—	—	—	

==== Monuments results timeline ====
Monument	2014	2015	2016	2017	2018	2019	2020	2021	2022	2023	2024	2025	2026
Milan–San Remo	—	38	—	125	—	—	—	—	102	100	163	DNF	154
Tour of Flanders	46	61	—	49	—	54	DNF	DNF	98	80	DNF	DNF	
Paris–Roubaix	DNF	—	—	—	2	57	NH	49	63	42	85	DNF	
Liège–Bastogne–Liège	—	—	123	—	—	—	—	—	—	—	—	—	
Giro di Lombardia	Has not yet contested during his career												

==== Major championships timeline ====
Event		2012	2013	2014	2015	2016	2017	2018	2019	2020	2021	2022
Olympic Games	Road race	—	Not held			—	Not held				—	NH
World Championships	Time trial	—	—	18	30	—	—	47	—	—	—	
World Championships	Road race	—	—	—	28	DNF	50	—	DNF	DNF	45	
World Championships	Team time trial	—	—	1	1	—	2	15	Not held			
National Championships	Time trial	—	—	3	1	DNS	2	2	—	2	—	—
National Championships	Road race	9	—	13	4	13	1	8	13	—	1	6

Legend
—	Did not compete
DNF	Did not finish
NH	Not held

=== Track ===
2008
1st Omnium, National Junior Championships
3rd Madison, UCI Junior World Championships
3rd Madison, National Championships
2009
National Championships

2nd Kilo
3rd Madison

2010
2nd Points race, National Championships
2011
UEC European Under-23 Championships

1st Madison (with Cyrille Thièry)
3rd Team pursuit

National Championships

1st Omnium
1st Madison (with Claudio Imhof)

2nd Points race, UEC European Championships
2nd Six Days of Zürich (with Glenn O'Shea)
2012
UEC European Under-23 Championships

1st Madison (with Jan Keller)
1st Individual pursuit
2nd Team pursuit

2nd Six Days of Berlin (with Franco Marvulli)
National Championships

3rd Individual pursuit
3rd Madison

3rd Six Days of Ghent (with Robert Bartko)
2013
1st Six Days of Zürich (with Iljo Keisse)
2014
2nd Six Days of Zürich (with Leif Lampater)
3rd Six Days of Ghent (with Leif Lampater)
2015
2nd Team pursuit, UEC European Championships
2nd Madison, National Championships
