= Isaac Carbonell =

Spanish cyclist

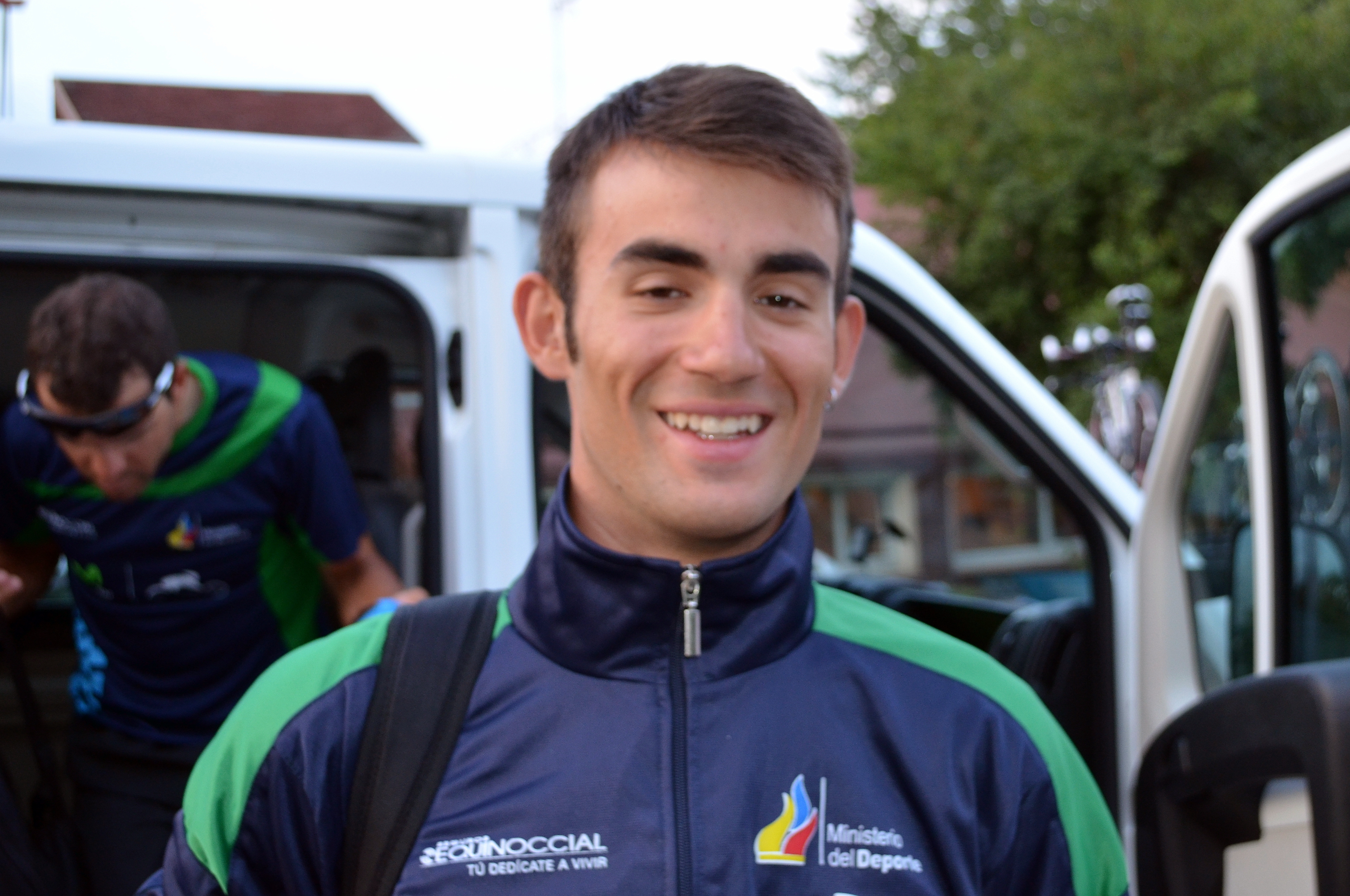
- Carbonell in 2014

Personal information
- Born: 6 August 1994 (age 32) Spain

Cycling career
- Sport: Cycling
- Discipline: Road
- Role: Rider

Professional teams
- 2014–2015: Team Ecuador
- 2016: Inteja–MMR Dominican Cycling Team

Isaac Carbonell (born 6 August 1994) is a Spanish racing cyclist. He rode at the 2014 UCI Road World Championships.
