= UCI Under 23 Nations' Cup =

- Sport: Road bicycle racing
- Founded: 2007
- Country: Europe, Asia and the Americas

The UCI Under 23 Nations' Cup is an annual, season-long competition for under-23 male road cyclists. It was created by the Union Cycliste Internationale in 2007 to aid in the development of young riders. It is the most important competition for under-23 riders.

== Races ==
=== Current ===
As of the 2022 edition, the following races were part of the Nations Cup:

- Tour de l'Avenir
- Orlen Nations Grand Prix
- Ghent–Wevelgem U23
- Course de la Paix-Grand Prix Jeseníky
- World Under-23 Championships
- European and Pan American continental championships

=== Former ===
- Ronde Van Vlaanderen U23
- Liège–Bastogne–Liège Espoirs
- La Côte Picarde
- Giro delle Regioni
- ZLM Roompot Tour
- Trofeo Almar
- Étoile d'Or
- Coupe des nations Ville Saguenay
- Toscana-Terra di Ciclismo
- Grand Prix Guillaume Tell
- Tour de l'Espoir
- Grand Prix du Portugal
- Oceanian, African and Asian continental cycling championships
