= Jonas Bokeloh =

German cyclist (born 1996)

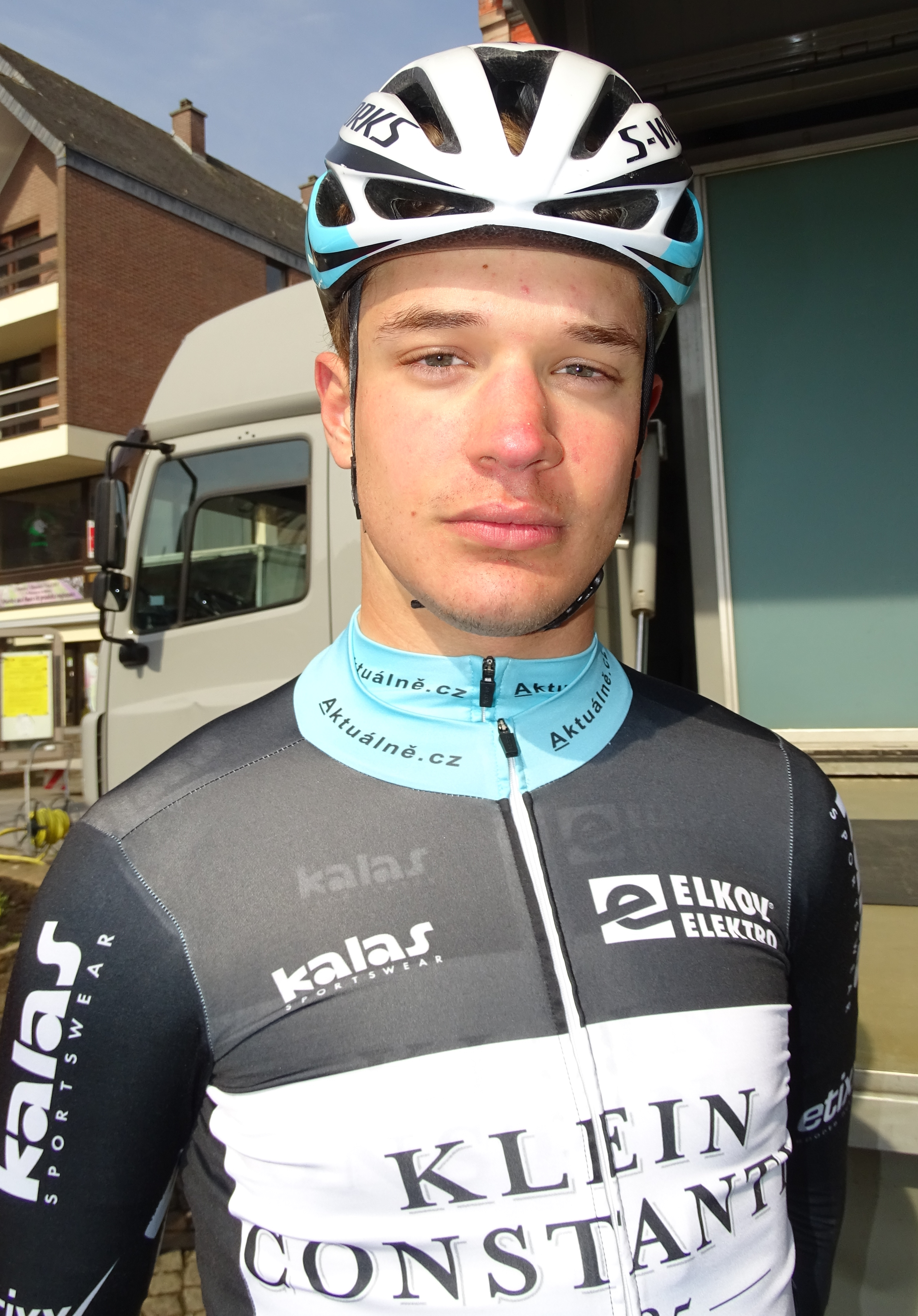
- Bokeloh in 2016

Personal information
- Full name: Jonas Bokeloh
- Born: 16 March 1996 (age 30) Frankfurt, Germany

Cycling career
- Sport: Cycling
- Current team: Retired
- Discipline: Road
- Role: Rider

Amateur teams
- 2008–2009: RC Blau-Gelb v. 1927 Langenhagen
- 2010–2014: HRC Hannover
- 2013: Saikl's–Cross-Juniorteam
- 2013–2014: LV Niedersachsen

Professional teams
- 2015: SEG Racing
- 2016: Klein Constantia
- 2017: An Post–Chain Reaction
- 2018: LKT Team Brandenburg
- 2019: Hrinkow Advarics Cycleang
Medal record
Representing Germany
World Championships
Gold medal – first place	2014 Ponferrada	Junior road race

Jonas Bokeloh (born 16 March 1996) is a German former professional road cyclist, who rode professionally between 2015 and 2019. He became junior world champion in 2014, winning in a bunch sprint finish. He had also won the German junior championship as well as the junior race of Rund um Köln the same year. In 2016, he won the 1.2 rated race Trofej Umag in Croatia.

== Major results ==
2014
1st Road race, UCI Junior Road World Championships
1st Road race, National Junior Road Championships
2015
9th Fyen Rundt
2016
1st Trofej Umag
4th Poreč Trophy
2017
1st Grote Prijs Beeckman-De Caluwé
2018
4th Trofej Umag
