= Alexandr Kulikovskiy =

Russian cyclist

Personal information
- Full name: Alexandr Kulikovskiy
- Born: 2 January 1997 (age 29)

Cycling career
- Sport: Cycling
- Discipline: Road
- Role: Rider
- Rider type: Sprinter

Amateur teams
- 2017–2018: Gazprom–RusVelo U23
- 2018: Gazprom–RusVelo (stagiaire)

Professional team
- 2019–2020: Gazprom–RusVelo

Alexandr Kulikovskiy (Russian: Александр Куликовский; born 2 January 1997) is a Russian cyclist, who most recently rode for UCI ProTeam Gazprom–RusVelo.

== Major results ==
2014
2nd Junior World Road Race Championships
2015
1st Stage 1 Peace Race Juniors
2016
1st Minsk Cup
1st Trofeo Almar
1st Stage 1 Baltic Chain Tour
4th Grand Prix Minsk
2017
2nd Under-23 National Road Race Championships
6th Grand Prix Minsk
2018
7th Trofeo Alcide Degasperi
7th Coppa della Pace
