= Jaume Sureda =

Spanish cyclist

Personal information
- Full name: Jaume Sureda Morey
- Born: 25 July 1996 (age 30) Son Servera, Spain

Cycling career
- Sport: Cycling
- Current team: Retired
- Discipline: Road
- Role: Rider

Amateur teams
- 2015–2016: Seguros Bilbao
- 2017–2018: Caja Rural–Seguros RGA Amateur

Professional team
- 2019–2021: Burgos BH

Jaume Sureda Morey (born 25 July 1996) is a Spanish former professional cyclist, who rode professionally between 2019 and 2021 for the Burgos BH team.

== Major results ==
2020
5th Overall Tour de Taiwan
