= Posada del Bierzo =

- Posada del Bierzo
- Location in Spain
- Coordinates: 42°33′N 6°44′W
- Autonomous community: Castile and León
- Province: León
- Comarca: El Bierzo
- Municipality: Carracedelo

Government
  - Type: Mayor
  - Mayor: Raul Valcarcel Diez (PP)

Area
  - Total: 4.4 km^{2} (1.70 sq mi)
  - Land: 3.7 km^{2} (1.41 sq mi)
  - Water: 0 km^{2} (0 sq mi)
  - Metro: 0.75 km^{2} (0.29 sq mi)
- Elevation: 450 m (1,480 ft)

Population
  - Estimate (2013): 150
- Demonym: Pouse
- Time zone: UTC+1 (CET)
  - Summer (DST): UTC+2 (CEST)
- Spanish postal code: 24390
- Climate: Csb

Posada del Bierzo is a village in the municipality of Carracedelo, in the region of El Bierzo, in the province of León, in Castile and León, Spain.

== History ==
In the late 1950s construction of the Barcena reservoir forced the relocation of the inhabitants of two villages which were to be inundated, ancient Barcena and Posada del Rio. The result was the construction of Posada del Bierzo.

== Demographic evolution ==
2000	2001	2002	2003	2004	2005	2006	2007	2008	2009	2010	2011	2012	2013
175	170	171	168	166	170	179	170	175	173	165	164	159	150

== Landmark buildings and interesting places ==
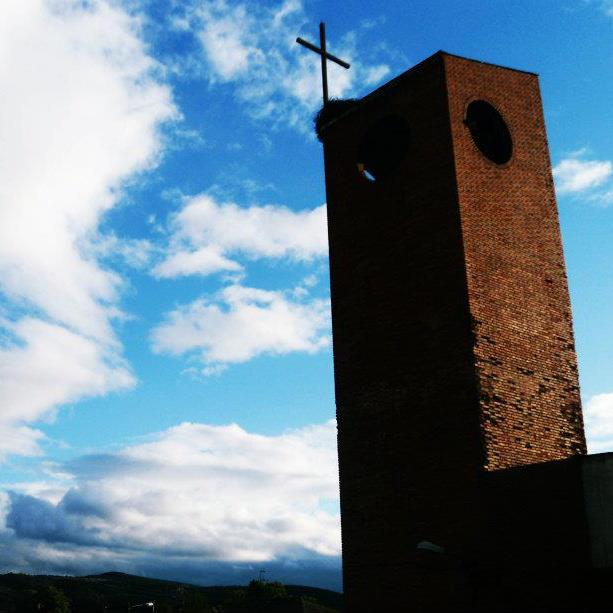
The Church.

- The Square Simón González Ferrando. Inaugurated by General Francisco Franco, on 16 September 1961.
- Saint Isidro's Church.
- The four spouts Fountain.

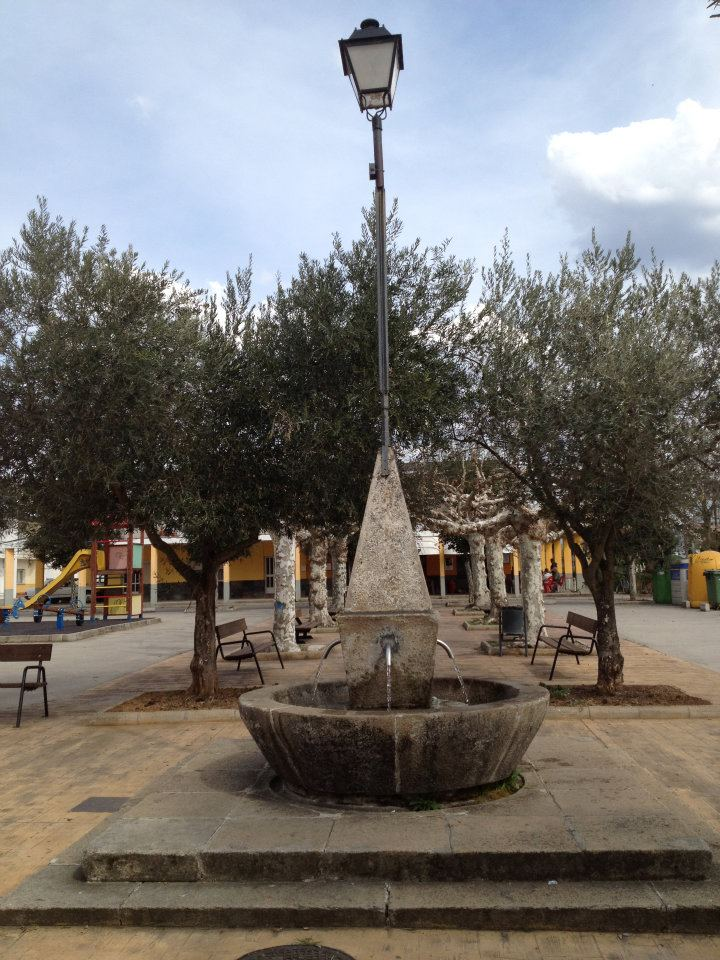
The fountain.

- San Isidro Museum, created by Mr. Dario Martinez.
- The Olde Oven, Ethnographic Heritage.

== Festivals and cultural activities ==
- January 5: Visit of the Three Wishes Kings and a chocolate party.
- February/March: Carnival.
- May 15: Saint Isidro Labrador (Village's Pattern).
- June 23: Bonfire of San Juan.
- July: Trip by the association.
- July–August: Summer parties.
- November: Magosto (chestnut party).
- December: Nativity scene in the village's church.

== Economy ==
=== Agriculture ===
In the village fruit production predominates, particularly pears and apples. They are shipped to cooperatives and exported to various cities of Europe.

== Climate ==
Climate data for Posada del Bierzo(period 2001–2013, Posada del Bierzo weather station )
Month	Jan	Feb	Mar	Apr	May	Jun	Jul	Aug	Sep	Oct	Nov	Dec	Year
Mean daily maximum °F	42.6	48.4	54.9	57.9	64.6	74.3	79.7	78.6	72.1	59.7	49.6	43.5	60.4
Daily mean °F	36.3	40.3	45.3	47.8	54.3	61.9	67.6	66.2	59.9	50.2	43.2	38.3	50.9
Mean daily minimum °F	28.0	30.0	34.0	36.0	43.2	49.6	54.7	52.5	47.1	38.5	37.2	29.3	39.9
Mean daily maximum °C	5.9	9.1	12.7	14.4	18.1	23.5	26.5	25.9	22.3	15.4	9.8	6.4	15.8
Daily mean °C	2.4	4.6	7.4	8.8	12.4	16.6	19.8	19.0	15.5	10.1	6.2	3.5	10.5
Mean daily minimum °C	−2.2	−1.1	1.1	2.2	6.2	9.8	12.6	11.4	8.4	3.6	2.9	−1.5	4.4
Mean monthly sunshine hours	82	98	156	187	196	268	307	287	217	156	99	63	2,116
