= La Martina =

Argentine sports and leisure clothing manufacturer

- Type: Private
- Industry: Retail
- Founded: 1985
- Founder: Michel Pieron
- Headquarters: Buenos Aires, Argentina
- Products: Apparel, Shoes
- Website: www.lamartina.com

La Martina is a luxury Argentine sports and leisure clothing manufacturer.

== History ==
La Martina was founded by Lando Simonetti, who was working in the fashion industry in the United States until 1985. That year he moved back to his native Argentina. The company originally created leather products such as saddles and boots for use in the sport of polo, and following this the company moved into the creation of other apparel such as shirts and caps. 65% of the materials used in the products are sourced locally in Argentina. In addition to La Martina, Simonetti also founded the Polo Management Group, which managed international polo tournaments in partnership with La Martina.

As of 2000 the company had sales of $1.2 million and its products could be purchased over the Internet. Over the 2000s sales for the company then increased to $200 million. At this point, the company began to refocus on polo equipment instead of pure fashion, rearranging its business operations in Europe in order to attempt the new direction. Sales slowed, though they did continue to grow at about twenty percent, in an effort to lessen the dilution of the "luxury" reputation of the brand. In 2015 La Martina opened its first store in London, and it has additional stores in North America, South America, and Asia. New clothing releases have occurred outside of Argentina, including at polo events in Dubai. Newsweek Magazine has stated of La Martina that it has, "changed the sport of kings by offering players more protection and comfort".

== Partnership ==
La Martina has been designated the official supplier of the Argentina polo teams by the Argentinean Polo Association, as well as the official supplier of Federation of International Polo, at all international tournaments. The countries for which La Martina designs its team polo shirts include the UK, Argentina, the United States, Brazil, and Dubai. In addition to the various national teams, La Martina also equips the university teams from Harvard, Yale, Oxford, Cambridge and the College of St. Xavier in Mumbai, as well as the England national team, Guards Polo Club, Polo de Paris and Milano Polo club. La Martina has partnered with luxury companies in the development of its lines as well. La Martina also produced Technical polo clothing and equipment for the Royal Salute team members.

== Events ==
La Martina was the co-sponsor of Maserati Centenary Polo Tour with Maserati, where 65 players from 12 countries participated. It has also been the sponsor of the Copa de La Martina polo championship. In 2014, La Martina polo created a luxury saddle for the event they co-sponsored together with Maserati.

== Anti-counterfeiting efforts ==
In January 2009, German police seized 20 tons of clothing after receiving complaints about La Martina holograms washing off shirts purchased on eBay.
