= Carracedelo =

- Municipality
- Coat of arms

- Location within Castile and León Location within Spain
- Coordinates: 42°33′17″N 6°44′2″W
- Country: Spain
- Autonomous community: Castile and León
- Province: León
- Comarca: El Bierzo

Government
  - Mayor: Raúl Valcarce Díez (PP)

Area
  - Total: 32.32 km^{2} (12.48 sq mi)
- Elevation: 456 m (1,496 ft)

Population (2025-01-01)
  - Total: 3,423
  - Density: 105.9/km^{2} (274.3/sq mi)
- Time zone: UTC+1 (CET)
  - Summer (DST): UTC+2 (CEST)
- Postal Code: 24549
- Telephone prefix: 987
- Climate: Csb
- Website: Ayto. de Carracedelo

Carracedelo (Spanish pronunciation: [karaθeˈðelo]) is a village and municipality located in the region of El Bierzo (province of León, Castile and León, Spain). According to the 2010 census (INE), the municipality has a population of 3,658 inhabitants. The partially restored ruins of the Monastery of Saint Mary of Carracedo are nearby.

The populated places of this municipality include Carracedo proper, Carracedo del Monasterio, Posada del Bierzo, Villadepalos, Villamartín de la Abadía and Villaverde de la Abadía.

It is one of the towns of El Bierzo where the population also speaks Leonese, but this language is extinguishing because the Junta of Castilla y León does not preserve Leonese culture in this zone. For these reasons Leonese is not taught in schools; it is an optional subject in the syllabus.
