= Greg LeMond =

American racing cyclist (born 1961)

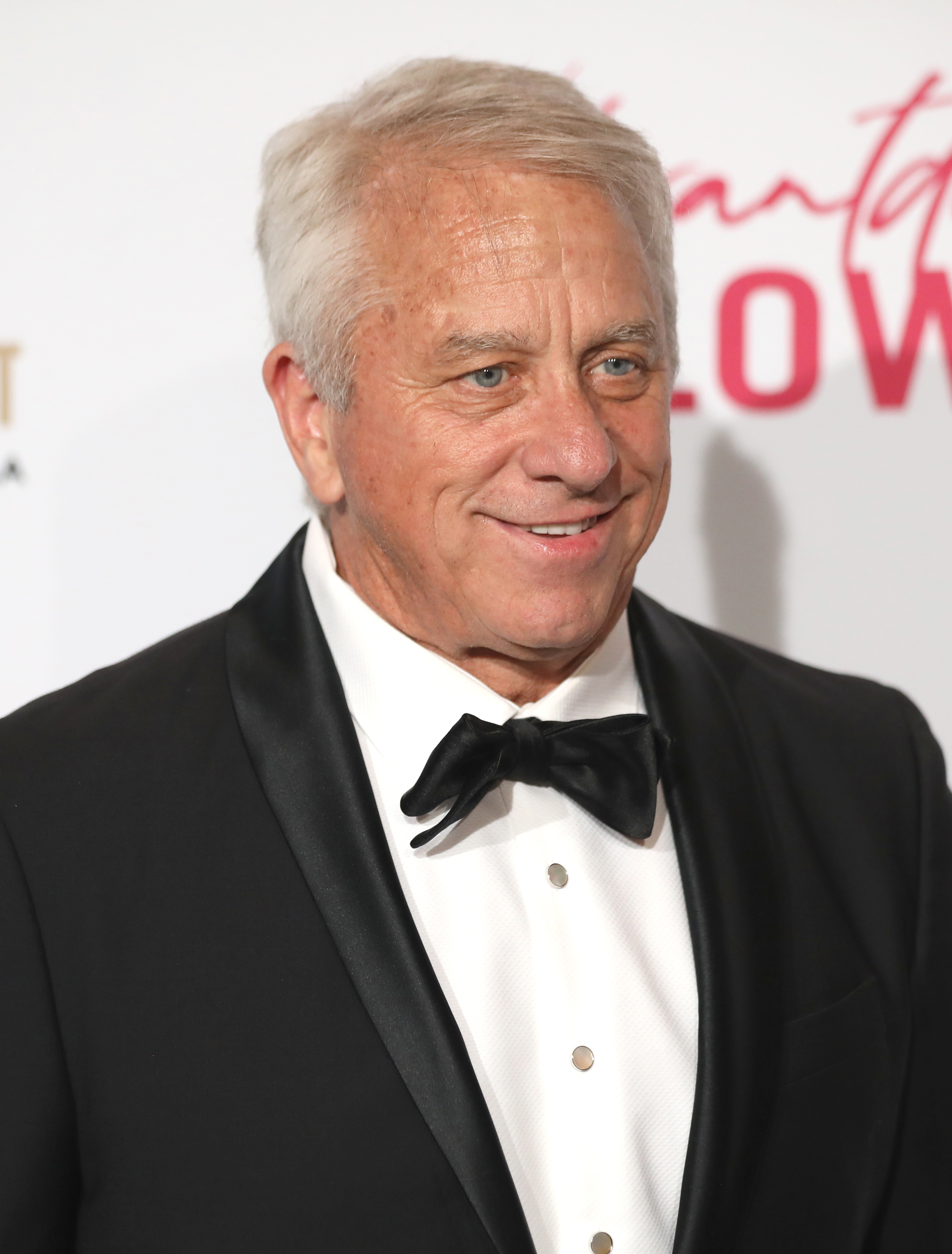
- LeMond in 2024

Personal information
- Full name: Gregory James LeMond
- Nicknames: L'Americain (The American); LeMonster
- Born: June 26, 1961 (age 65) Lakewood, California, U.S.
- Height: 1.78 m (5 ft 10 in)
- Weight: 67 kg (148 lb; 10 st 8 lb)

Cycling career
- Sport: Cycling
- Discipline: Road
- Role: Rider
- Rider type: All-rounder

Amateur team
- 1976–1980: U.S. National Team

Professional teams
- 1981–1984: Renault–Elf–Gitane
- 1985–1987: La Vie Claire
- 1988: PDM–Ultima–Concorde
- 1989: AD Renting–W-Cup–Bottecchia
- 1990–1994: Z–Tomasso

Major wins
- Grand Tours Tour de France General classification (1986, 1989, 1990) Young rider classification (1984) Combination classification (1985, 1986) 5 individual stages (1985, 1986, 1989) 2 TTT stages (1984, 1985) Giro d'Italia 1 individual stage (1986) Stage races Tour de l'Avenir (1982) Critérium du Dauphiné Libéré (1983) One-day races and Classics World Road Race Championships (1983, 1989) Other Super Prestige Pernod International (1983)
Medal record
Representing United States
Men's road bicycle racing
World Championships
Gold medal – first place	1979 Buenos Aires	Junior road race
Gold medal – first place	1983 Altenrhein	Road race
Gold medal – first place	1989 Chambéry	Road race
Silver medal – second place	1982 Goodwood	Road race
Silver medal – second place	1985 Giavera di Montello	Road race

Gregory James LeMond (born June 26, 1961) is an American former road racing cyclist. He won the Tour de France three times, and the Road Race World Championship twice, becoming the only American male to win the former.

LeMond began his professional cycling career in 1981. Two years later, LeMond became the first American male cyclist to win the Road World Championship. He won the Tour de France in 1986, becoming the first non-European professional cyclist to win the men's Tour. LeMond was accidentally shot with pellets and seriously injured while hunting in 1987. Following the shooting, he underwent two surgeries and missed the next two Tours. At the 1989 Tour, LeMond completed an improbable comeback to win in dramatic fashion on the race's final stage. He successfully defended his Tour title the following year, becoming one of only nine riders to win three or more Tours. LeMond retired from competition in December 1994 and was inducted into the United States Bicycling Hall of Fame in 1996. He was the first professional cyclist to sign a million-dollar contract and the first cyclist to appear on the cover of Sports Illustrated.

During his career, LeMond championed several technological advancements in pro cycling, including the introduction of aerodynamic "triathlon" handlebars and carbon fiber bicycle frames, which he later marketed through his company LeMond Bicycles. LeMond's other business interests have included restaurants, real estate, and consumer fitness equipment. He is also a vocal opponent of performance-enhancing drug use in cycling and is a founding board member of 1in6, a nonprofit charity that assists male victims of child sex abuse.

== Early life and amateur career ==
LeMond was born to Bob and Bertha LeMond on June 26, 1961, in Lakewood, California, and was raised in the Washoe Valley, a ranch country on the eastern slopes of the Sierra Nevada mountain range between Reno, and the family home about 2.5 mi (4.0 km) north of Carson City, Nevada. LeMond has two sisters, Kathy and Karen.

LeMond grew up living an active outdoor life. Hiking, hunting, skiing, and flyfishing were boyhood pastimes. The ranch country of the Sierra Nevada mountain range lent itself to such pursuits. A hyperactive youngster, LeMond believes that these outdoor activities helped keep him out of trouble. LeMond stated, "I was a boy who just could not sit still. I had trouble focusing in school. Parents and educators then did not have the skill set to diagnose and cope with what we know now was a classic case of attention deficit hyperactivity disorder (ADHD). ADHD certainly was not the frequently medicated childhood disease it is today. My triumph over the symptoms was found atop two thin tires over many dusty miles." He also said, "That's one of the traits. It's the inability to sit down [and listen] to something you are not really interested in and absorb it. If they are interested in it, people with ADD excel in really good ways. When I got into cycling, I would say the sport itself took a fog off my brain. I was able to absorb stuff I read. It changed my life."

LeMond attended Earl Wooster High School in Reno but lived too far away to participate in team sports. He soon biked almost daily to high school, often riding home from Wooster, taking a route over Mt. Rose, along to Incline Village, then south on Hwy 28, then downhill to Carson City, then to his home.

LeMond's introduction to cycling came in 1975, thanks to freestyle skiing pioneer Wayne Wong, who recommended the bike as an ideal off-season training aid. LeMond started competing the following year, and after dominating the Intermediate category (13–15) and winning the first 11 races he entered, LeMond received permission to ride against older, more seasoned competitors in the Junior (16–19) category.

In 1977, at age 15, LeMond finished second in the Tour of Fresno to John Howard, then the United States's top road cyclist and the 1971 Pan American Games champion. He caught the attention of Eddie Borysewicz, the US Cycling Federation's national team coach, who described LeMond as "a diamond, a clear diamond." LeMond represented the United States at the 1978 Junior World Championships in Washington, D.C., where he finished ninth in the road race, and again in the 1979 Junior World Championships in Argentina, winning gold, silver and bronze medals—the highlight being his victory in the road race. At age 18, LeMond was selected for the 1980 U.S. Olympic cycling team, the youngest ever to make the team. However, the U.S. boycott of the 1980 Summer Olympics in Moscow prevented him from competing there.

Borysewicz, whom LeMond described as his "first real coach," wanted to retain his protégé through the next Olympic cycle and discouraged him from turning pro, but LeMond was determined. Nevertheless, while he was the reigning Junior World Road Champion in 1980, LeMond received no professional offers, and so in the spring of 1980, he joined the U.S. National cycling team for a six-week European racing campaign. There, LeMond finished third overall in the Circuit des Ardennes before winning the 1980 Circuit de la Sarthe stage race in France, thereby becoming the first American and youngest rider of any nationality "in the history of the sport to win a major pro-am cycling event [in Europe]." That victory, and the subsequent press coverage, raised LeMond's profile in Europe and he was scouted at his next event (the Ruban Granitier Breton stage race) by Cyrille Guimard, the Renault–Elf–Gitane team's directeur sportif. Guimard said that he was impressed with LeMond's spirit, and told him, "You have the fire to be a great champion", before offering LeMond a professional contract for 1981 with Renault. After returning to the United States, LeMond won the 1980 Nevada City Classic, considered to be one of the most historic and challenging professional cycling races in the United States. Despite eventually receiving several other offers to turn professional besides Guimard's, LeMond did not consider them seriously, and he signed with Renault in Paris on the day the 1980 Tour de France finished.

== Professional career ==
LeMond was an "exceptionally gifted" amateur rider who quickly established himself as one of the most talented cyclists on the professional circuit. Respected cycling journalist John Wilcockson, who reported the Tour de France for more than 40 years, described LeMond as a rider who was a fuoriclasse. (Note: Quote: Fuoriclasse means much more than being gifted. In cycling, it is someone who has a slow pulse, large lungs, perfectly proportioned limbs, lean muscles, and, above all, the brain and mindset to utilize all those attributes to win the world's toughest races at the youngest possible age.)

=== 1981–1983: Early years ===
LeMond's first professional victory came three months into his 1981 debut when he won a stage of the French Tour de l'Oise. LeMond followed with a win in the Coors Classic in the United States, finishing ahead of Sergei Sukhoruchenkov, the 1980 Olympic Road champion. The major step forward in 1981 occurred in the Critérium du Dauphiné Libéré stage race, where LeMond placed third. The achievement is the more remarkable because he rode the race in support of team leader Bernard Hinault. LeMond missed standing on the podium with race winner Hinault, as Pascal Simon had finished ahead of him. Two weeks later, Simon was assessed a 10-minute penalty when it was discovered he had been doping. LeMond considered the race to have been a "major steppingstone" in his career. LeMond stated, "It showed me that I had the kind of climbing ability that you need to win the top European stage races." He won a total of five races in his rookie season of 1981.

On April 11, 1982, LeMond broke his collarbone while racing the cycling classic Liège–Bastogne–Liège. The injury forced LeMond to ride a reduced schedule before entering the World Championships, which were in Goodwood, England that year. In the men's road race competition, LeMond broke for the line but was out-sprinted by Italian Giuseppe Saronni. Following the race, LeMond's American teammate Jacques Boyer accused LeMond of chasing him down in the final 800 meters. Saronni was very strong at the end of the race and flew past Boyer and LeMond, winning by five seconds over LeMond, with another five seconds back to Kelly. Boyer placed tenth. Bronze medalist Sean Kelly, a favorite to win the race, was with Saronni when he caught LeMond with about 200 meters to go, but he could not hold his wheel. Said Kelly: "I don't think that Boyer was fading ... He got quite a good gap. Nobody wanted to go after him ... Yes, LeMond chased down Boyer. Boyer was the only man up the road."

"Boyer really did a good ride. He made a good move, but a move like that has about a five-percent chance of making it ... There's no way in the world that I could have helped Boyer in the last 400 meters. The only thing I could have done was throw on my brakes, crash in front of the pack, and hopefully hold off Saronni. I mean, what kind of tactics is that? At 400 meters to go you just don't put on your brakes, especially in the World Championships."

— Greg LeMond in response to the criticism he received for his performance in the men's road race at the 1982 World Championships.

LeMond was supported by his teammate George Mount, who observed, "What's LeMond going to do? Throw his bike down in front of everybody because Boyer is such a good buddy of everyone? ... Hell no—he's going to start sprinting because it's less than 200 meters to go and the sprint's already been going for a couple hundred meters. LeMond made a good move and a good sprint ... Boyer was not going to win that race. The best he could have got was fifth or sixth place."

LeMond did not apologize. The U.S. team was not as set up as the European teams, and did not have an independent race to determine the national champion. Instead, the highest finisher at the World's was considered the national champion. LeMond had argued for the team to compete as the European teams did, but team management and Boyer voted against him. Thus, unlike the other teams at the world championship, the US riders were competing against each other. (Note: Quote LeMond:"After the 1980 world championship, Jock had himself declared national champion because he was the best placed American in the world championships. The whole year he got to race in a star-spangled jersey, just like the American flag, as national champion. I had made it clear before going to Prague that I was not going to race the world championship as the national championship and have myself competing against other Americans instead of us all working together. The Dutch team didn't enter the race riding against each other to see who would become national champion. That's the spirit I wanted." US team officials called for a vote. Two riders sided with Boyer, two with LeMond. An official cast the deciding vote in favor of deciding the national champion as the highest placed American finisher at the world championship race. Said LeMond "Fine, but you race without me. If you want me to race, I'm racing for the world championship.") At age 21, LeMond was the first American pro to win a medal at the World's since Frank Kramer took silver in 1912. LeMond stated, "I'm racing for Renault and I'm racing for myself. It's a business, and it's my living. To me, that second place was almost as good as winning, especially at my age."

Two weeks later, on September 20, 1982, LeMond won the mountainous 12-day, 837-mile (1,347 km) Tour de l'Avenir by a record 10 minutes, 18 seconds. The victory, and the time advantage LeMond held at the end, stunned Europe and provided broad confirmation that LeMond was indeed fuoriclasse.

The following year in 1983, LeMond won the Road World Championship in Altenrhein, Switzerland outright, becoming the first American male cyclist to do so. (Audrey McElmury won in 1969 and Beth Heiden won in 1980.)

=== 1984–1986: Grand Tours ===
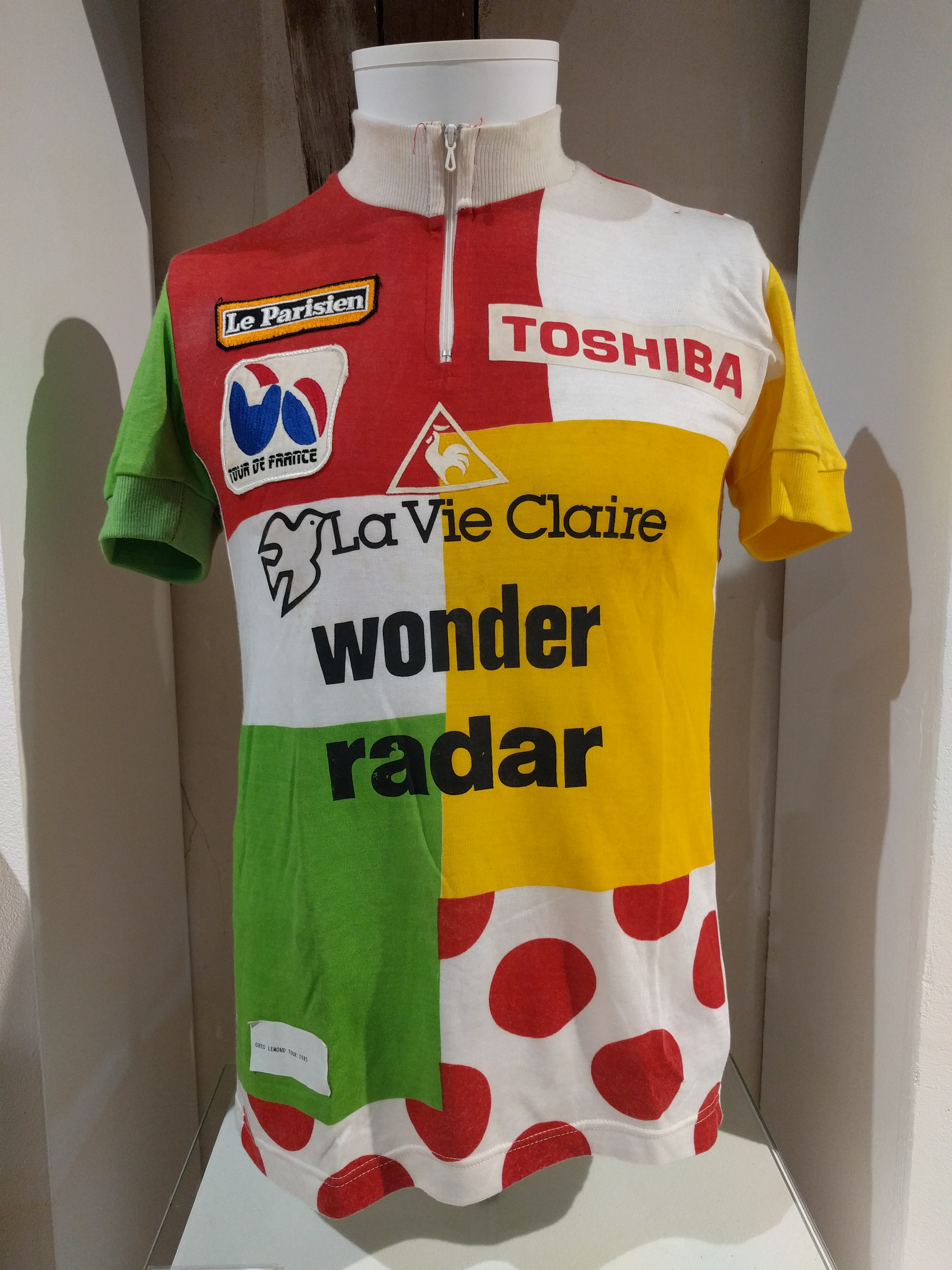
LeMond's combination classification jersey of the 1985 Tour de France

LeMond rode his first Tour de France in 1984, finishing third in support of team leader Laurent Fignon and winning the white jersey of the young rider classification. The following year, he was brought across to La Vie Claire to ride in support of team captain Bernard Hinault who had regained his form and was attempting to win his fifth Tour. French businessman and team owner Bernard Tapie signed LeMond with a $1 million contract over three years. In the race, Hinault led through the early mountain stages, but suffered a crash and came into difficulty. At this point, it was clear that LeMond was an elite rider capable of winning the Tour in his own right. LeMond possessed a natural talent for riding the Grand Tours and got stronger over the course of a three-week race. The injured Hinault was vulnerable, and his competitors knew it. Stage 17 included three major climbs in the Pyrenees. On the second, the Col du Tourmalet, LeMond followed Stephen Roche in an attack, but was not given permission to help build on the gap over the field. The managers of his La Vie Claire team ordered the 24-year-old LeMond not to ride with Roche, but to sit on his wheel, a tactic to use the rider in front as cover for wind resistance so the following rider uses less energy. (Note: Said Stephen Roche:"Greg was getting orders to attack me and not to ride. The main order was not to ride. That was frustrating. I think he felt he was stronger than me, and if he knew he had a better chance of beating me at the finish and in the time trial than why not ride? If we'd ridden at that point I think we'd have finished first and second in that Tour. Of course the team car was playing it down for Hinault. He was further back than they were letting on. They knew if we worked together Hinault wouldn't get back on, and LeMond would have won. They were looking after French interests.) The pace Roche could put out by himself eventually slowed, and other riders came up to join the two men. Hinault recovered as well, though he did not regain the lead group. At the end of the stage, LeMond was frustrated to the point of tears. He later revealed that team management and his own coach Paul Köchli had misled him as to how far back Hinault had dropped during the crucial Stage 17 mountain stage. Hinault won the 1985 Tour, with LeMond finishing second, 1:42 behind. LeMond had ridden as the dutiful lieutenant, and his support enabled Hinault to win his fifth Tour. (Note: The term "dutiful lieutenant" is a cycling term for a teammate who sacrifices his own placing in a race to support his team leader.) In repayment for his sacrifice, Hinault promised to help LeMond win the Tour the following year.

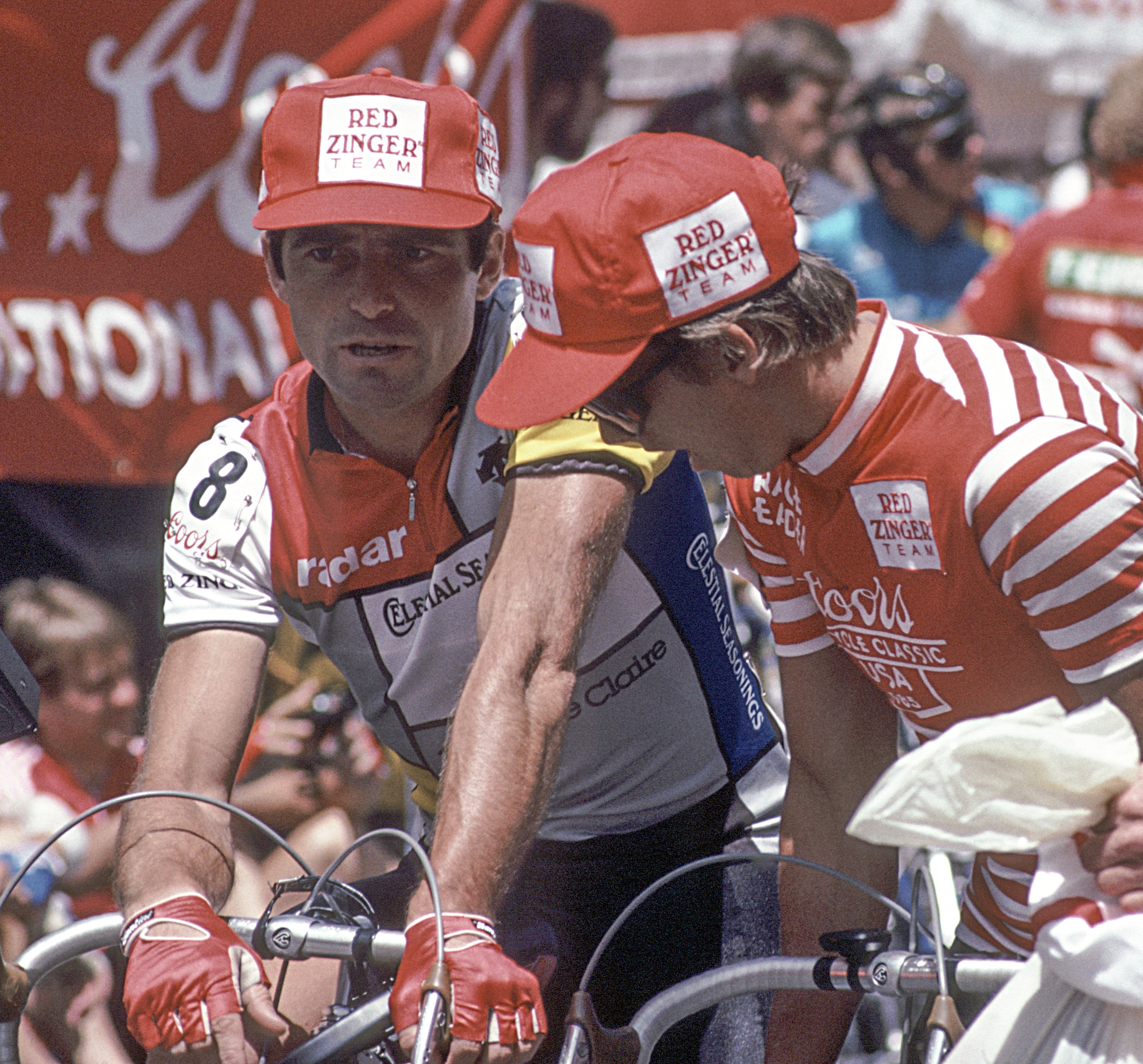
LeMond (right) with Bernard Hinault at the 1985 Coors Classic

Hoping to end the season on a high note, LeMond entered the World Championships road race with the strongest team the United States ever fielded. Riders included Boyer and LeMond, as well as Andrew Hampsten, Ron Kiefel, Bob Roll and Eric Heiden and this time the American team was set up to help the three strongest riders in LeMond, then Hampsten and Kiefel. Throughout the race, LeMond answered repeated attacks and led many chase groups to contain dangerous breakaways, but by the final lap of the race, he was beginning to tire. However, LeMond was part of the group that was going to win, and while Hampsten and Keifel survived the race to this point, they were too far back to assist LeMond in the final 10 km (6.2 mi). Inside the final kilometer, the last rider to launch an attack was former Tour and Vuelta champion Joop Zoetemelk. Being as he was 38 years old and long past his prime, none of the remaining contenders, including LeMond, Claudio Corti, Robert Millar, Moreno Argentin, or Stephen Roche, took the attack seriously at first. Zoetemelk opened a sizeable gap, but before long, it was in excess of 100 meters and quickly growing. He also had two teammates remaining in Johan van der Velde and Gerard Veldscholten, assisting him by riding at the front but not actually chasing, therefore slowing the chase group. Italian rider Argentin took up the chase, but he had nothing left to close the gap and actually put his hand in the air, waving for the other riders to come forward and take up the pursuit. LeMond also had nothing left to chase down in this final attack, feeling that if he did, LeMond would not have anything left for the sprint and would not win any medal at all. In a notable upset, Zoetemelk beat the favorites to the line by three seconds as LeMond out-sprinted Argentin to take the silver. There was no controversy following this silver medal for LeMond, and he rode up alongside the Dutchman immediately after the race to congratulate him by saying, "Nice ride Joop."

For the 1986 Tour, LeMond was a co-leader of the La Vie Claire team alongside Hinault. Hinault's support seemed less certain the closer the race approached. An unspoken condition was that his help would be contingent upon LeMond demonstrating that he was clearly the better rider. (Note: In a pre-race story featured in L'Équipe, Hinault stressed it is not Hinault, but the race that will decide the outcome, saying "The strongest rider will win".) Hinault was in superb form and had the chance to win an unprecedented sixth Tour. Hinault chose to let the Stage 9 individual time trial be the decider for which rider would receive the full support of team La Vie Claire. (Note: Said LeMond: "His attitude seemed to be 'We'll see after the first time trial. We'll let that decide who is leading the team.' ... which was not the deal we cut.") Hinault won the Stage 9 time trial, finishing 44 seconds in front of LeMond. LeMond had bad luck during the stage, having suffered a punctured tire requiring a wheel change, and later in the stage a bicycle change was required when he broke a wheel. LeMond was frustrated with the outcome and the impact it would have on how the team would function for the remainder of the race. In Stage 12, the first mountain stage of the race in the Pyrenees, Hinault attacked the lead group and built up an overall lead. By the end of Stage 12, Hinault had a five-minute lead over LeMond and the other top riders. He claimed he was trying to draw out LeMond's rivals, but none of these attacks were planned with LeMond. (Note: Said Hampsten about the first climb of Stage 12: "It was superhot, and early on Hinault was working really hard to drive a group clear, and I thought, That's a little weird. There was a long way to go. I asked Greg, 'Why's Hinault doing this? Did he talk to you?' And Greg said, 'No.' He had no idea why Hinault was riding so hard; it was like he was on a mission.") He was clearly willing to ride aggressively and take advantage of the opportunities presented. LeMond was never placed in difficulty, except by his own teammate. The following day, Hinault broke away again early but was caught and then dropped by LeMond on the final climb of Stage 13, allowing LeMond to gain back four and a half minutes. The next three stages brought the Tour to the Alps. On Stage 17, LeMond and Urs Zimmermann dropped Hinault from the leading group, and the end of the day saw LeMond pulling on the yellow jersey of race leader, the first time it had ever been worn by a rider from the United States. The following day in the Alps saw Hinault attack again early on the first climb, but he was pulled back. Attempting an escape on the descent, Hinault was unable to separate himself from LeMond. The La Vie Claire team leaders were both excellent descenders. As they ascended up the next col, they continued to pull away from the field and maintained the gap as they reached the base of the final climb, the vaunted Alpe d'Huez. They pressed on through the crowd, ascending the 21 switchbacks of Alpe d'Huez and reaching the summit together. LeMond put an arm around Hinault and gave him a smile and the stage win in a show of unity, but the infighting was not over. Hinault attacked again on Stage 19 and had to be brought back by teammates Andrew Hampsten and Steve Bauer. (Note: Said Hampsten: "It's the only time I ever chased a teammate in my life. It felt weird; I felt sick doing it. I'm chasing my hero, who also happens to be my teammate, but you know what? I'm thinking 'This isn't cool. Greg has the jersey.' I knew it was the right thing to do. I was pissed, sick of the whole situation. Steve and I needed to support Greg.") Commenting on the team situation prior to the final individual time trial at Stage 20, LeMond offered the following with a wry smile: "He's attacked me from the beginning of the Tour De France. He's never helped me once, and I don't feel confident at all with him."

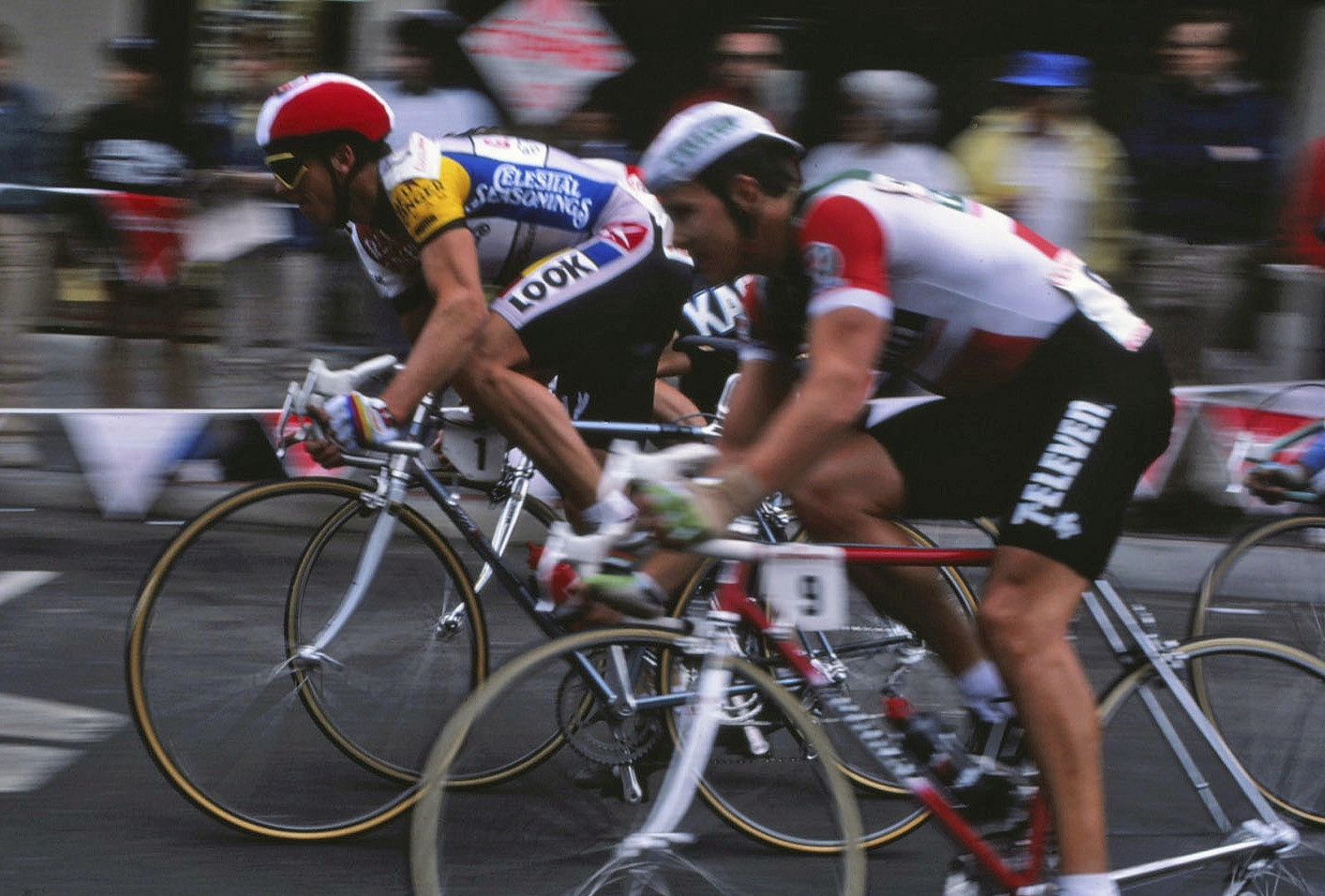
LeMond (left) in the 1986 Coors Classic

LeMond had to keep his eye on his teammate and rival throughout the race. Hinault rode aggressively and repeatedly attacked, and the division created in the La Vie Claire team was unmistakable. LeMond would keep the yellow jersey to the end of the race and win his first Tour, but he felt betrayed by Hinault and the La Vie Claire team leadership. LeMond later stated that the 1986 Tour was the most difficult and stressful race of his career.

=== 1987–1988: Shooting accident and recovery ===
LeMond had planned to defend his title in the 1987 Tour de France with La Vie Claire, but he was unable to participate. Earlier that year, while riding in the Tirreno–Adriatico spring tune-up race, LeMond fell and fractured his left wrist. He returned to the United States to recover from the injury. The week before returning to Europe, LeMond went turkey hunting on a ranch co-owned by his father in Lincoln, California. LeMond was with Rodney Barber and Patrick Blades, his uncle, and brother-in-law. The trio had become separated when Blades, who heard movement behind him, turned and fired through a bush. The movement had come from LeMond, who was hit in his back and right side with approximately 60 pellets. LeMond's injuries were life-threatening, but a police helicopter was already airborne near the scene and transported LeMond on a 15-minute air medical flight to the Medical Center at University of California, Davis. LeMond was taken for emergency surgery. He had suffered a pneumothorax to his right lung and extensive bleeding, having lost some 65 percent of his blood volume. A physician informed LeMond later that he had been within 20 minutes of bleeding to death. The operation saved his life, but four months later LeMond developed a small bowel obstruction due to adhesions that had formed following the shooting. He underwent another surgery to relieve the obstruction and take down the adhesions. Concerned that his team would drop him if they knew the shooting accident required a second surgery, LeMond asked the surgeons to remove his appendix at the same time. LeMond then informed his team that he had had his appendix removed, but the rest of the story was left somewhat vague. The events effectively ended his 1987 season, and in October he announced he would return to serious competition the following February, with the Dutch PDM team.

With 35 shotgun pellets still in his body, including three in the lining of his heart and five more embedded in his liver, LeMond attempted to return to racing in 1988. His comeback was hampered by over-training which resulted in tendonitis in his right shin, requiring surgery. LeMond missed the Tour for the second year running. Tensions in the relationship between LeMond and PDM were aggravated when LeMond discovered that doping was going on at the PDM squad. The result was that LeMond moved from PDM, one of the strongest teams in the peloton, to ADR, a team based in Belgium. The team was co-sponsored by Coors Light for American races. The deal was completed on New Year's Eve, just hours before LeMond would have been legally obliged to ride another season for the Dutch team. Joining the Belgian ADR squad allowed LeMond to continue to compete, but with teammates like Johan Museeuw who were better suited to riding Classics than Grand Tours.

=== 1989: Return to elite level ===
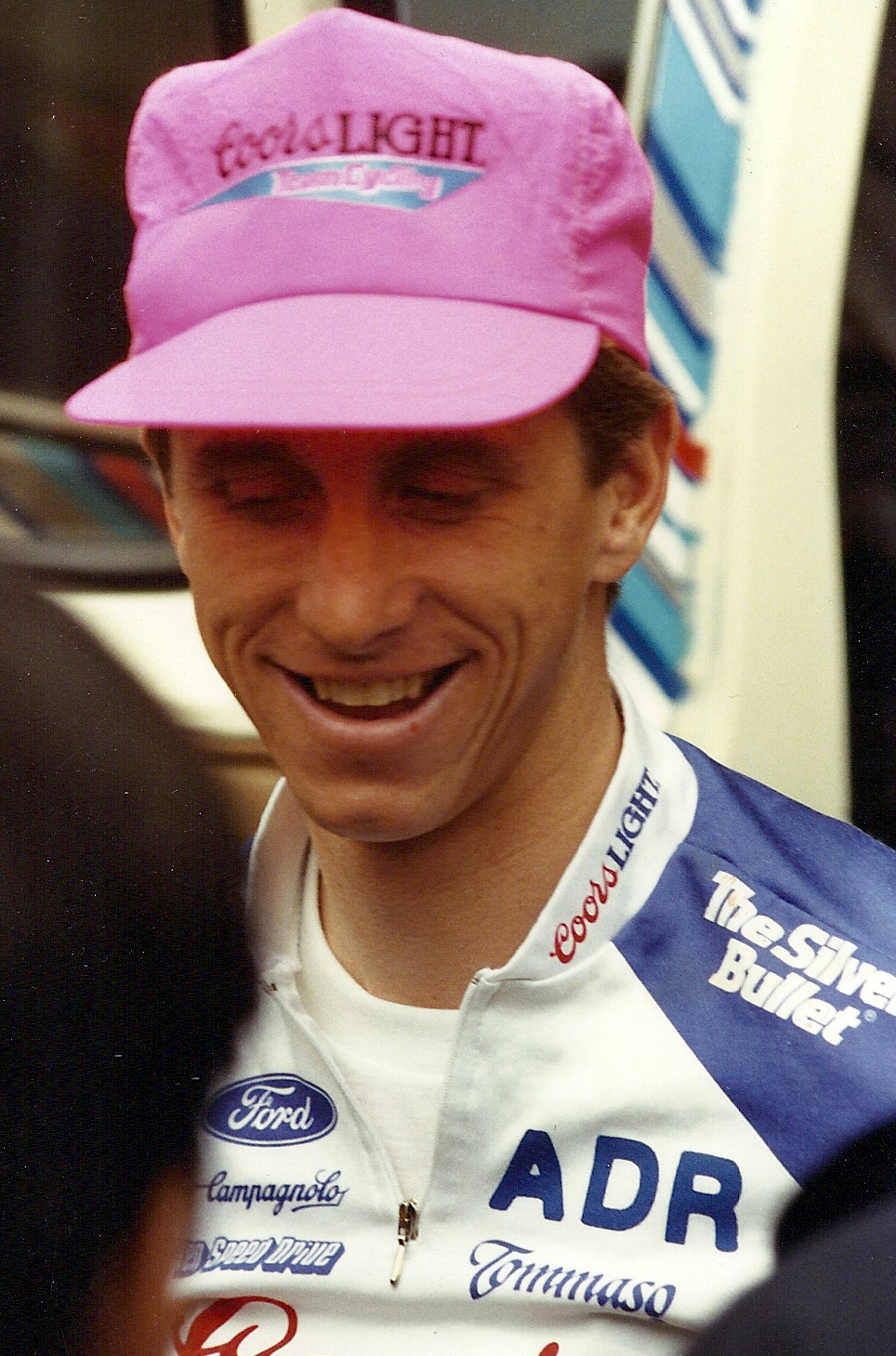
LeMond in 1989 at the Tour de Trump

After struggling in the 1989 Paris–Nice early-season race and failing to improve his condition, LeMond informed his wife Kathy that he intended to retire from professional cycling after the 1989 Tour de France. LeMond had some flashes of form with sixth overall in Tirreno–Adriatico and in the two-day Critérium International, sharing an escape with Fignon, Indurain, Mottet, Roche, and Madiot and finishing fourth overall. He started the 1989 Giro d'Italia in May as preparation for the Tour to follow, but struggled in the mountains and was not in contention for any of the leaders' jerseys before the final 53 km (33 mi) individual time trial into Florence. LeMond placed a surprising second there, more than a minute ahead of overall winner Laurent Fignon. (Note: Quote Fignon: On the evening after I won the Giro Guimard came to have a word with me. All I was thinking about was celebrating my triumph. Guimard was already concerned about July and looked me straight in the eyes: 'LeMond will be up there at the Tour'. I could not hide my amazement.) LeMond attributed some of his improvement to an anti-anemia treatment he received twice during the race.

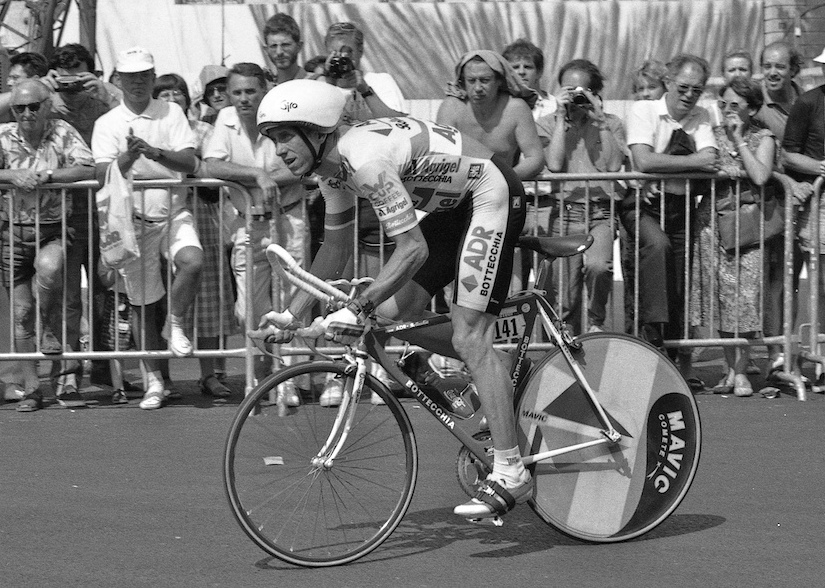
LeMond starts the final time trial of the 1989 Tour de France

Coming into the 1989 Tour de France LeMond was not considered a contender for the general classification (GC). (Note: General classification tracks overall times for bicycle riders in multi-stage bicycle races. Each stage will have a stage winner, but the overall winner of the race is the rider with the lowest time in the GC. That is, the rider who has the fastest time when all the stage results are added together.) His own most optimistic hope was to finish his final Tour in the top 20. Without the weight of expectation and other pressures of being a Tour favorite, LeMond surprised observers with a strong ride in the 7.8 km (4.8 mi) prologue in Luxembourg, finishing fourth out of 198 riders. Buoyed by the result, LeMond continued to ride well over the opening flat stages, winning the 73 km (45 mi) stage 5 individual time trial, and gaining the yellow jersey as leader of the general classification for the first time in three years. He seemed to ride himself into better condition during the first week's flat stages, and LeMond was coming into peak form by the time the Tour reached the mountains. He remained at the front of the race in the Pyrénées but lost the lead to his former teammate and rival Laurent Fignon on stage 10 in Superbagnères. Five days later, LeMond reclaimed yellow in the Alps, after the 39 km (24 mi) stage 15 mountain time trial from Gap to Orcières-Merlette. The see-saw battle continued, and when Fignon attacked on the upper slopes of Alpe d'Huez, LeMond was unable to go with him, placing the yellow jersey back on the shoulders of Fignon. Fignon held a 50-second advantage over LeMond going into the 21st and final stage, a rare 24.5 km (15.2 mi) individual time trial from Versailles to the Champs-Élysées in Paris.

Fignon had won the Tour twice before, in 1983 and 1984, and was a very capable time trialist. It seemed improbable that LeMond could take 50 seconds off Fignon over the short course. This would require LeMond to gain two seconds per kilometer against one of the fastest chrono-specialists in the world. LeMond had done wind tunnel testing in the off season and perfected his riding position. He rode the time trial with a rear disc wheel, a cut-down Giro aero helmet and the same Scott clip-on aero bars which had helped him to the Stage 5 time trial win. Holding his time trialing position, LeMond was able to generate less aerodynamic drag than Fignon, who used a pair of disc wheels but chose to go helmetless and did not use the aero bars that are now commonplace in time trials. Instructing his support car not to give him his split times, LeMond rode flat-out and finished at a record pace to beat Fignon by eight seconds and claim his second Tour de France victory. As LeMond embraced his wife and rejoiced on the Champs-Élysées, Fignon collapsed onto the tarmac, then sat in shock and wept.

The final margin of victory of eight seconds is the closest in the Tour's history. LeMond's 54.545 km/h (33.893 mph) average speed for the stage 21 time trial was, at that time, the fastest in Tour history. Since then, only the 1994 and 2015 prologues and David Zabriskie's 2005 time trial performance have been faster. (Note: Zabriskie eventually admitted to doping throughout his career, including the period in question.) The press immediately labeled LeMond's come-from-behind triumph as, "the most astonishing victory in Tour de France history," and while LeMond admitted that it felt almost "too good to be true", he personally rated it as "much more satisfying" than his first overall Tour win in 1986.

LeMond's return to the pinnacle of cycling was confirmed on August 27, when he won the 259 km (161 mi) World Championships road race in Chambéry, France. Late in the race with less than 10 km (6.2 mi) to go, the lead group, made up of three very strong riders in Steven Rooks, Thierry Claveyrolat, and Soviet star Dimitri Konyshev, were trying to hold on to fight for the victory amongst themselves when Laurent Fignon broke away from the pursuing group in an effort to chase the leaders down and solo to victory. On the final climb of the race, LeMond attacked in pursuit of Fignon on his own. Before long, LeMond had caught the Frenchman, and not long after that the pair could see the lead group in front of them and they were quickly closing the gap. LeMond briefly dropped Fignon and caught the lead group on his own. Immediately upon catching Rooks, Claveyrolat, and Konyshev, LeMond moved to the front and set the pace as two other riders, Canadian Steve Bauer and Irishman Sean Kelly, attempted to bridge the gap up to LeMond and the lead group. Bauer ended up getting a flat tire, essentially ending his hopes at a high finish, while Sean Kelly was able to fight his way to the front group, which was bad news for LeMond and the others as Kelly was one of the best sprinters in the world. Fignon was able to rejoin the lead group as well and as the race approached the finish Fignon attacked on numerous occasions, trying to drop the remaining riders. Rooks also launched an attack to go for the solo victory but was caught by LeMond, Fignon, and the others. Inside the final kilometer, Fignon continued attacking, trying to break free, but could not force open a gap and began to fall back as the sprint materialized, eventually finishing in sixth place. LeMond, Konyshev, and Kelly were the strongest riders when it came to the final sprint for victory, and they finished in that order. After the race, LeMond said that he did not feel well and even considered abandoning the race. With two laps to go, LeMond began feeling stronger and stated, "I was racing for the gold medal. I wanted that World Championship. And with one kilometer to go, I knew I could get it." He was only the fifth person in history to win both the Tour de France and the World Championship in the same year. In December, Sports Illustrated magazine named LeMond its 1989 "Sportsman of the Year", the first time a cyclist received the honor.

=== 1990: A third Tour win ===
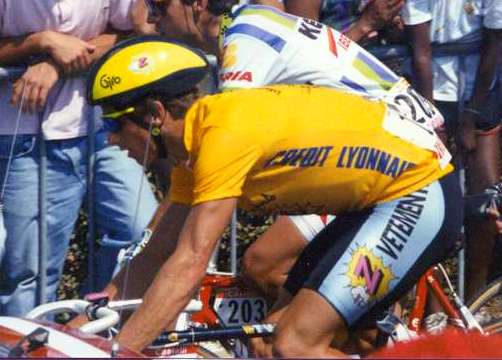
LeMond leading the 1990 Tour de France

LeMond parlayed the success of his 1989 season into the then-richest contract in the sport's history, signing a $5.5 million deal for three years with Z–Tomasso of France, the first time a cyclist had signed a multi-million dollar contract. He entered the 1990 Tour de France as defending champion and a pre-race favorite after leaving ADR to join the much stronger French team. At "Z" his teammates included Robert Millar, Éric Boyer, and Ronan Pensec, all of whom already had finishes in the top six of the Tour de France. This unified roster of strong riders appeared capable of supporting LeMond in the mountains and controlling the race on the flats. The squad's tactical plan was upset on the first day, when a breakaway that included LeMond's teammate Ronan Pensec, but no major favorites, arrived ten minutes ahead of the field. LeMond was prevented from challenging for the lead until the yellow jersey left the shoulders of his teammate. Surprisingly, Pensec held the lead through the first high mountain stages, including Alpe d'Huez, but he lost it soon after to the relative unknown Claudio Chiappucci.

LeMond closed in on Chiappucci, and on stage 16, LeMond put his stamp of authority on the race during the final climb of Luz Ardiden. Late in this stage, after all of the breakaways had been caught, LeMond launched a devastating attack that no one could answer. Miguel Induráin was the only rider able to get on LeMond's wheel but it was LeMond dictating the pace all the way up the climb as Chiappucci, Delgado, and all of the other favorites fell further and further behind. While Induráin stayed with LeMond, he was not a threat for victory, but his performance put the cycling world on notice; he went on to win the next five Tours. Near the end of the stage, LeMond sat up, and the Spaniard took the stage win, but the devastation of LeMond's competitors was all but complete, as there was now only a +0:05 difference between LeMond and the yellow jersey.

LeMond finally overtook Chiappucci on the final individual time trial on stage 20, where he finished over two minutes ahead of the unheralded Italian. LeMond at last had the yellow jersey, wearing it the following day as the Tour rode into Paris. He won the 1990 Tour without taking any of the individual stages. LeMond was the last rider to win the Tour while wearing the world champion jersey until Tadej Pogačar achieved the feat in 2025. Over the course of the 1990 Tour, the perceived strength of the Z team was confirmed, as they led the team classification through most of the race, adding the team title to LeMond's yellow jersey. His 1990 Tour victory made LeMond one of just five cyclists to win three or more Tours. As of 2024, a total of eight cyclists have won three or more times.

In September, LeMond attempted to defend his title at the 1990 UCI Road World Championships, but finished fourth, eight seconds behind the winner, his former teammate Rudy Dhaenens of Belgium.

=== 1991–1994: Change in the peloton and retirement ===
LeMond felt confident before the 1991 Tour de France. He was the defending champion, trained well, and had a solid team to support him. LeMond was among the leaders going into the Stage 8 individual time trial, and he finished second to the Spaniard Miguel Induráin. LeMond felt that he was riding extremely well, and though his TT effort had propelled him into the yellow jersey as leader of the general classification, losing eight seconds to Indurain shook his confidence. LeMond held the yellow jersey for the next four days until Stage 12, a challenging 192 km (119 mi) mountain stage. He experienced difficulty on the first climb, and he cracked on the Col du Tourmalet, losing significant time to Claudio Chiappucci, and eventual winner Indurain. LeMond continued to race, but was unable to seriously challenge for the lead thereafter, finishing the 1991 Tour seventh overall.

In 1992, LeMond won the Tour DuPont, which would be the last major win of his career. LeMond also had a strong top 10 finish in Paris–Roubaix early in the season. He never won any of cycling's 'Monument' races, but LeMond had several high places in four out of five of them throughout his career, including fourth in Paris–Roubaix, third in Liège–Bastogne–Liège, and second in Milan San Remo as well as the Giro di Lombardia.

In the 1992 Tour de France, LeMond started strongly and finished fourth in a breakaway on Stage 6 that put him fifth overall. LeMond maintained his fifth place until the mountain stages, when he lost form disastrously and lost more than 45 minutes on the stage to Sestrieres before quitting the race the next day—when his compatriot and former domestique Andrew Hampsten won atop Alpe d'Huez. While LeMond claimed a serious saddle sore caused him to abandon, he had earlier stated, "My climbing is not like usual. I've climbed much better in the past Tours. This year I'm just not feeling my usual self."

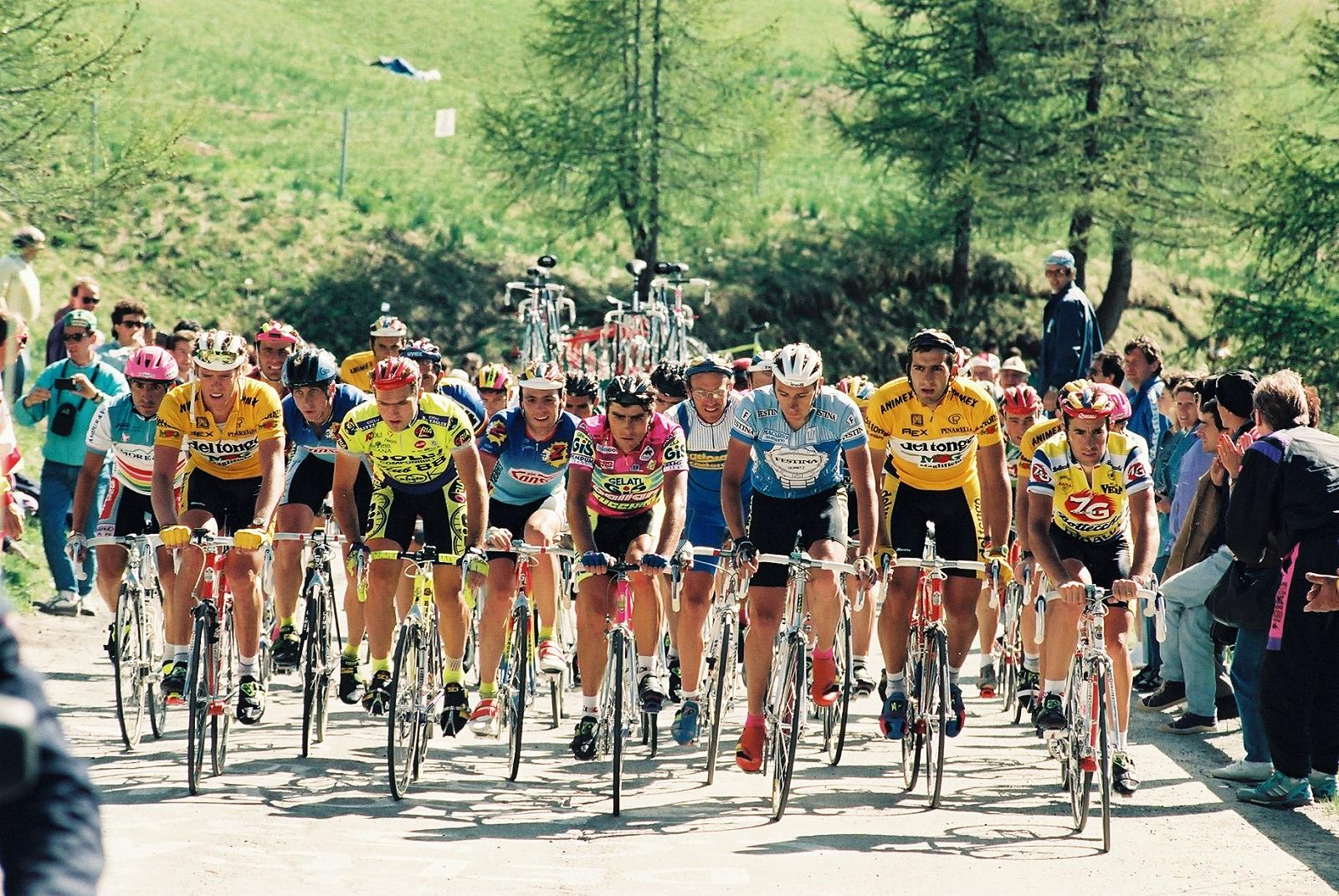
Former Tour champions Greg LeMond (fourth from left) and Laurent Fignon (center) climb with the "autobus" to Sestriere on Stage 13 of the 1991 Giro d'Italia

LeMond did extensive endurance training on the road the following winter, but his performances the following spring failed to improve. LeMond had to abandon the 1993 Giro d'Italia two days before the final stage after difficult racing left him 125th on GCC and third-from-last in the final time trial. LeMond was too exhausted to enter the 1993 Tour de France. Following the 1993 season, he hired renowned Dutch physiologist Adrie van Diemen to advise him on a new technique to monitor training and measure performance. The (SRM) power-based training would make use of the watt as a guide to power output. In November 1993, LeMond confided to Samuel Abt that power output in watts would become the key metric. (Note: Quote LeMond: I know about training. I wrote a book about training. But I got away from what I used to do. I was doing cross-country skiing and easy riding in the winter and I'm starting to go in the opposite way now, working on my power, lifting weights with my legs, working on increasing my oxygen consumption. I'm watching my weight. I need to build my power and strength up as high as I can and then worry about my endurance. Endurance is the easiest aspect to build up. What I'm doing now is the opposite of what I've been doing, always working on my endurance. Except in 1989, when I did a lot of power training in the winter and that year I had great results as early as February. I'm not going to rush. I'm going to build up slowly, that's my goal, to really have a good base so that when I start racing hard in February, March and April, my body doesn't get tired from it and I get better. Which hasn't been the case the last couple of years.") The watt has gained wide acceptance as the best measure of a cyclist's training performance.

The following year, LeMond began the 1994 Tour de France but found that he was unable to race effectively. LeMond had to abandon after the first week before the race had reached the difficult mountain stages. That December, he announced his retirement. At the time, the reasons for LeMond's increasing difficulties were not entirely known. At a loss, he speculated that a condition known as mitochondrial myopathy might be responsible for the difficulty he was having performing against the current riders. (Note: Mitochondrial myopathy is a rare condition in which the body's cellular energy system breaks down.) However, in 2007, LeMond speculated that he might not have had the condition after all, and suggested that lead toxicity from the shotgun pellets still embedded in his body might have been responsible, the effects of which were increased by heavy training.

LeMond has acknowledged since 2010 that the increasing prevalence of doping in cycling contributed to his lack of competitiveness. LeMond stated, "Something had changed in cycling. The speeds were faster and riders that I had easily outperformed were now dropping me. At the time, the team I was on, Team Z, became more and more demanding, more and more concerned..." He stated he had been told in 1994 that he would need to blood dope in order to win again. He frankly admitted to Abt in 1999: "I figure I had three months that went right for me after the hunting accident," three months in which LeMond won the two Tours and a world road race championship. "The rest were just pure suffering, struggling, fatigue, always tired."

In a wide-ranging interview with American novelist Bryan Malessa in 1998, LeMond was asked if his career had not been interrupted by the hunting accident, how did he feel he would compare to five-time Tour winners such as Bernard Hinault and Miguel Induráin. LeMond responded: "Of course you can't rewrite racing history, but I'm confident that I would have won five Tours." (Note: Quote: Interviewer:"Barring your hunting accident, do you feel like you were capable of joining the ranks of riders like Hinault and Indurain? Do you feel that you could have won five Tours?" LeMond: "Well, look at the facts. I have three Tour victories. I gave away the '85 Tour. I was out because of an accident during the two prime years of my career, '87 and '88, which were two of the easiest years to win the Tour in that period. I mean if you're in the thick of racing, you understand the hierarchy. During those two years, Hinault was out, Fignon was out. Put it this way, in '89 and '90 I only feel like I raced to 90 to 95 percent of my potential. In '86 I was much stronger, climbed much faster, much better time-trialist. When we would do the time-trials, Hinault and I would finish two to three minutes up on most people. And you have to remember that in cycling, every year you make minute improvements. In '86 I wasn't out of the top five stage races from February to September. Of course you can't rewrite racing history, but I'm confident that I would have won five Tours.")

Two years after his retirement, LeMond was inducted into the United States Bicycling Hall of Fame in a ceremony at Rodale Park in Trexlertown, Pennsylvania. The event was held on June 8, 1996, during the U.S. Olympic Cycling Team Trials.

In July 2014, ESPN announced the premiere of a new 30 for 30 film entitled Slaying the Badger. The film centers on LeMond and his former teammate Hinault at the 1986 Tour de France. It is based on the book of the same name by Richard Moore, and it premiered on ESPN on July 22.

A 2022 documentary entitled The Last Rider directed by Alex Holmes for New Black Films, features LeMond, and wife Kathy, and details LeMond's life and career.

== Business interests ==
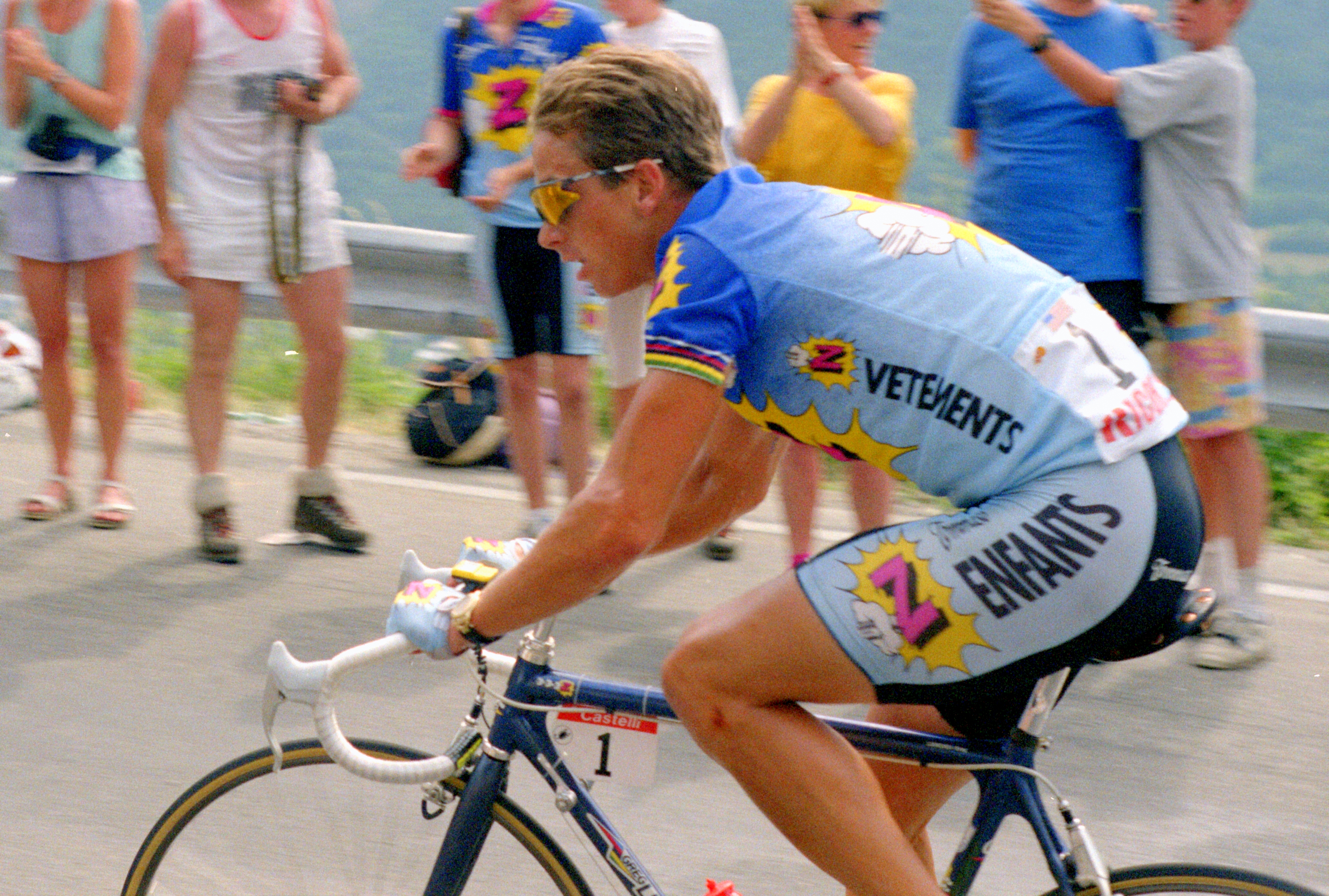
LeMond riding on a carbon fiber bicycle in the 1991 Tour de France

LeMond was a pioneer in the use of carbon fiber bicycle frames in European professional road cycling, and his Tour de France win in 1986 ahead of Bernard Hinault was the first for a carbon-framed bicycle. Ironically, given the rivalry that existed at the time between the American and his French teammate, LeMond rode a "Bernard Hinault" Signature Model Look prototype that year. LeMond also won the 1989 Tour de France, the 1989 World Championship, and his final Tour de France in 1990 on carbon fiber frames. These bicycle frames featured "Greg LeMond" branding.

=== LeMond Cycles ===
In 1990, LeMond founded LeMond Bicycles to develop machines for himself that would also be marketed and sold to the public. The following year, searching for an equipment edge for Team Z at the 1991 Tour de France, LeMond concluded an exclusive licensing agreement between his company and Carbonframes, Inc., to access the latter's advanced composites technology. Whilst using the bikes for the 1991 Tour, he would maintain his carbon bike in his hotel room, leading his mechanics to fear it had been stolen. While LeMond briefly led the 1991 Tour overall, riding his Carbonframes-produced "Greg LeMond" bicycle, the company eventually faltered, something LeMond blamed on "under-capitalization" and poor management by his father. Carbonframes and LeMond Cycles "parted amiably two years later." In 1995, with his company allegedly nearly bankrupt, LeMond reached a licensing-agreement with Trek Bicycle Corporation, according to which the Wisconsin-based company would manufacture and distribute bicycles designed with LeMond that would be sold under the "LeMond Bicycles" brand. LeMond would later claim that going into business with Trek "destroyed" his relationship with his father. The lucrative partnership, which generated revenue for Trek in excess of US$100,000,000, would be renewed several times over the course of 13 years, but it ultimately ended in acrimony after LeMond's relationship with Trek deteriorated over his staunch anti-doping advocacy.

LeMond found himself at odds with Trek in July 2001 after he expressed public concern over the relationship between Italian doping doctor Michele Ferrari and Trek's star athlete, Lance Armstrong. Trek president John Burke pressured LeMond to apologize, claiming, "Greg's public comments hurt the LeMond brand and the Trek brand." Burke allegedly justified his demand for an apology by advising that, "As a contractual partner, he [LeMond] could criticize doping only generally – not point his finger at specific athletes, particularly one that happens to be the company's main cash cow." Armstrong reportedly said privately he could "shut him up" by contacting Trek, as documented in affidavits by Frankie and Betsy Andreu released in the 2012 USADA doping report. LeMond issued an apology for his comment.

In a 2007 interview, LeMond accused Armstrong of trying to sabotage his relationship with Trek bicycles. In March 2008, LeMond Cycling Inc sued Trek for failing to properly promote and distribute the LeMond brand, and for attempting to "silence" LeMond's public comments about doping, attributing this to the influence of Armstrong on Trek. His complaint included statistics detailing slow sales in some markets, including the fact that between September 2001 and June 2007, Trek only sold $10,393 worth of LeMond bikes in France, a country in which LeMond was both famous and popular. Trek responded in April 2008, announcing that it was dropping LeMond Bicycles from its product line and that it would sue to sever the licensing agreement.

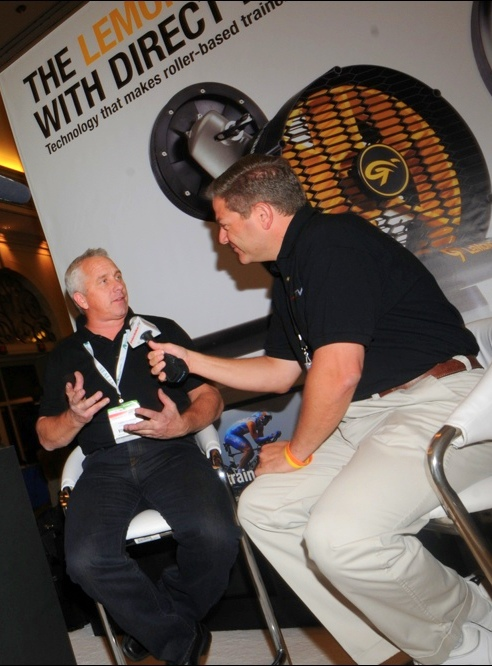
LeMond (left) at the 2010 Interbike trade show

As promised, Trek counter-sued and stopped producing bicycles under the LeMond brand. After nearly two years of litigation, LeMond reached a confidential out-of-court settlement with Trek in February 2010. The settlement permitted the case to be dismissed with prejudice, meaning that "neither side can produce the same claims against one another in a future lawsuit." Although settlement terms were not disclosed, LeMond reportedly obtained full control over the LeMond Bicycles name, while Trek made a donation of US$200,000 to the charity 1in6, of which LeMond was a founding member of the board of directors.

=== LeMond Fitness/Revolution ===
In 2002, LeMond, Bernie Boglioli, and others founded LeMond Fitness, Inc. "to help individuals achieve their fitness and performance goals and train more effectively." The company's primary business is the development and manufacture of bicycle trainers and indoor exercise bikes for consumers in the United States and internationally. LeMond serves as chairman of the board. In 2012, Hoist Fitness negotiated to purchase an interest in the company and announced plans to move its headquarters to Hoist's offices in San Diego, California. In late 2012, LeMond purchased the LeMond Revolution from Hoist, relaunching with a new management team in Minneapolis. Later, he also formed LeMond LLC to introduce a suite of brands. Professional cycling's Garmin–Sharp team renewed its sponsorship with LeMond to use its Revolution trainers for another three seasons. The team won several stages of the Tour de France, plus the general classification of the 2012 Giro d'Italia.

=== Partnership with Time ===
At the Interbike trade show in September 2013, LeMond announced that he was returning to the business of bicycle manufacture and sales by partnering with French company Time. The new line began with a series of commemorative designed bicycles, to be followed with road, cyclocross, and gravel-road models. LeMond purchased Time Sport USA, the US distributor for the company. He stated, "I'm really excited to be back in the bike industry."

=== Real estate ===
In 2002, LeMond joined his parents-in-law David and Sacia Morris, friend Michael Snow, and J.P. Morgan & Co. fund manager Jorge Jasson to invest in the exclusive Yellowstone Club, a Big Sky, Montana, private ski and golf community founded by timber baron Tim Blixseth and his wife Edra. Each of the five partners paid Blixseth $750,000 for one percent shares in the exclusive resort. LeMond also purchased several building lots and maintained a property at the resort. Four years later, LeMond and partners sued Blixseth in 2006 following reports of a Credit Suisse loan to the resort of $375 million from which Blixseth reportedly took $209 million in a disputed partial payout for his ownership stake. The Credit Suisse loan was based on a $1.16 billion Cushman & Wakefield valuation of the resort, for which LeMond and partners each sought $11.6 million for their one-percent shares. In 2007, LeMond settled his suit with the Blixseths for $39 million. However, LeMond and his partners remained creditors as the Blixseths defaulted on a $20 million payment (after having already paid the group $18 million). In 2009, the Blixseths divorced and the Club went bankrupt.

=== Restaurants ===
LeMond became a restaurateur in August 1990 when, in partnership with his wife and her parents, he opened Scott Kee's Tour de France on France Avenue in the Minneapolis suburb of Edina, Minnesota. LeMond described the restaurant, which was named for its chef (LeMond's brother-in-law), as "a dream of five years come true." Explaining the origin of the concept, LeMond said, "Kathy and I have eaten at the finest establishments in France, Italy and Belgium. Our favorites have always been small places, family-owned." He also partnered in several Bruegger's bagel bakery–café franchises.

=== LeMond Composites ===
LeMond founded LeMond Composites in 2016 to manufacture high-volume, low-cost carbon fiber composites under a licensing agreement with the Oak Ridge National Laboratory and an exclusive 20-year licensing agreement with Deakin University. In 2017, LeMond and his family moved from Minnesota to Oak Ridge, Tennessee, to be close to the $125 million LeMond Composites manufacturing facility.

On October 16, 2017, Australian politician Sarah Henderson announced that LeMond Composites would receive AU$2.5 million (US$1.88 million) in Australian Federal Government funding to establish a carbon fiber manufacturing plant in Geelong, Australia.

== Broadcasting ==
In 2014, LeMond joined Eurosport as a pundit for the channel's cycling coverage, providing analysis at Paris–Roubaix, the Giro d'Italia and the Tour de France, and hosting his own monthly program LeMond on Cycling. He continued to work for the channel until 2017.

== Anti-doping stance and controversies ==
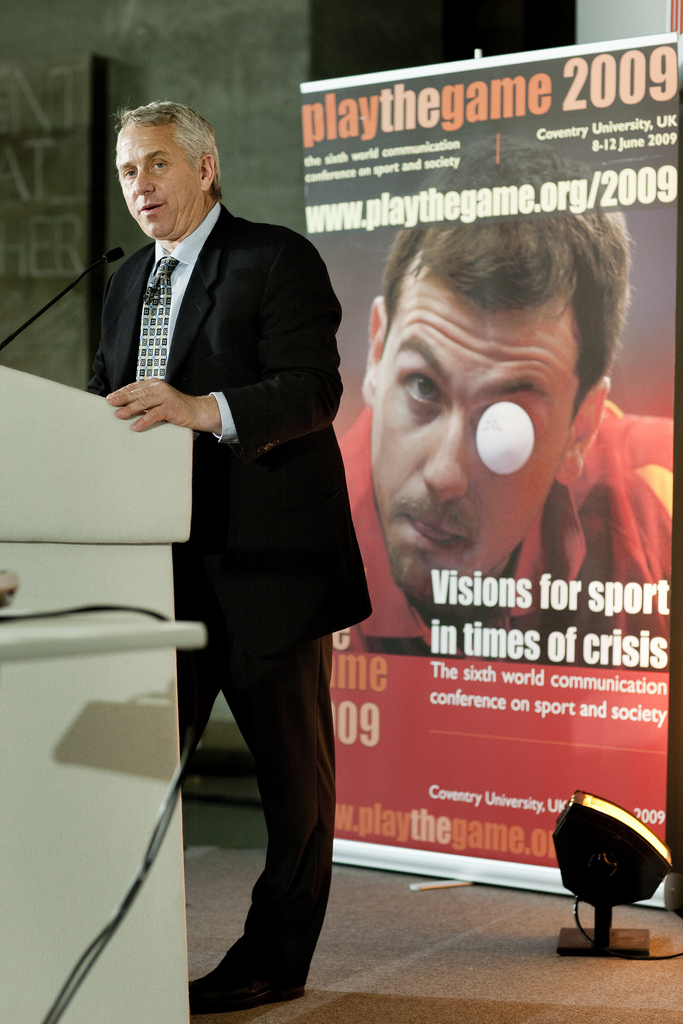
LeMond addresses the Play the Game 2009 conference

LeMond is a longtime vocal opponent of performance-enhancing drug use. He first spoke on-record against doping in cycling after winning the 1989 Tour de France. LeMond has consistently questioned the relationship between riders and unethical sports doctors and has pointed out that doping products ultimately victimize the professional cyclists who make use of them. LeMond stated, "When I speak out about doping people could translate it and think it was about the riders. Actually I feel like I am an advocate for the riders. I look at them as being treated like lab rats that are test vehicles for the doctors. The doctors, the management, the officials, they're the ones that have corrupted riders. The riders are the only ones that pay the price."

In 2001, LeMond received intense criticism when he publicly criticized Lance Armstrong's relationship with Dr. Michele Ferrari. Ferrari is an Italian physician and sports trainer who admitted to practicing blood doping and advocated the controlled use of the banned substance erythropoietin by athletes. Upon learning of Armstrong's association with Ferrari, LeMond stated:

"When Lance won the prologue to the 1999 Tour I was close to tears, but when I heard he was working with Michele Ferrari I was devastated. In the light of Lance's relationship with Ferrari, I just don't want to comment on this year's Tour. This is not sour grapes. I'm disappointed in Lance, that's all it is."

LeMond's comments placed him in the center of an anti-doping controversy. About a month later, following pressure from both Armstrong and Trek, LeMond issued an apology for his comment; he called Armstrong "a great champion", and added, "I do not believe, in any way, that he has ever used any performance-enhancing substances. I believe his performances are the result of the same hard work, dedication and focus that were mine 10 years ago."

In 2004, LeMond spoke out again. On the heels of successive Tour de France wins by Armstrong, LeMond said, "If Armstrong's clean, it's the greatest comeback. And if he's not, then it's the greatest fraud." LeMond went public with the fallout of his 2001 statement, alleging that Armstrong had threatened to defame him and threatened his business interests as well:

"[Armstrong] basically said 'I could find 10 people that will say you took EPO' ... The week after, I got multiple people that were on Lance ... Lance's camp, basically saying 'You better be quiet,' and I was quiet for three years. I have a business ... I have bikes that are sold ... and I was told that my sales might not be doing too well if ... just the publicity, the negative publicity."

The same month, LeMond told French newspaper Le Monde that Armstrong was "ready to do anything to keep his secret. I don't know how he can continue to convince everybody of his innocence." At a press conference Armstrong gave in September 2008 to announce his return to cycling, LeMond publicly challenged him with questions about doping. Armstrong appeared angry and interrupted LeMond, telling him it was time to move on. In August 2012, the USADA announced that Armstrong had been issued a lifetime ban from cycling competition due to his involvement in a massive doping scheme. In addition, the USADA stripped Armstrong of his seven Tour de France titles.

LeMond has also clashed with fellow Tour rider Floyd Landis regarding the doping issue. On May 17, 2007, LeMond testified at a USADA hearing convened to weigh the evidence of doping by Landis during the 2006 Tour de France. Under oath, LeMond described a phone conversation he had with Landis on August 6, 2006, as well as another with Landis's business manager, Will Geoghegan, on May 16, 2007, the evening before LeMond appeared to testify. The major points of the testimony were:

- In the August 6 conversation, LeMond said he told Landis that "If you did (admit to having used banned substances), you could single-handedly change the sport. You could be the one who will salvage the sport." LeMond said Landis responded by saying "What good would it do? If I did, it would destroy a lot of my friends and hurt a lot of people."
- In their conversation, LeMond had disclosed his history of childhood sexual abuse to Landis and said the secret had nearly destroyed him. LeMond stated he warned Landis. "(Lying about doping) will come back to haunt you when you are 40 or 50. If you have a moral compass and ethics, this will destroy you."
- Will Geoghegan attempted to stop LeMond's testimony by calling LeMond on his mobile phone. LeMond reported that Geoghegan claimed he was "his uncle" and intimated that he would appear at the hearing and expose the fact that LeMond was a survivor of child sex abuse. LeMond's BlackBerry, with Geoghegan's phone number captured in the call log, was entered into evidence.

In 2007, Landis was found guilty of doping and was banned from cycling for two years. In 2010, he admitted to having been involved in doping. That same year, Landis apologized to LeMond for the events of 2007.

On July 23, 2009, LeMond wrote an opinion article in the French newspaper Le Monde where he questioned the validity of Alberto Contador's climb up Verbier in the 2009 Tour de France. In the piece, LeMond pointed out that Contador's calculated VO2 max of 99.5 mL/(kg·min) had never been achieved by any athlete. LeMond stated, "The burden is then on Alberto Contador to prove he is physically capable of performing this feat without the use of performance-enhancing products." Contador tested positive for clenbuterol after winning the 2010 Tour and was later stripped of his title and suspended from cycling for two years.

LeMond has criticized the UCI and its former president, Pat McQuaid. In December 2012, LeMond claimed that a change needed to be made in the leadership for the UCI and stated if called upon he would be willing to take the position himself if necessary to lead cycling out of the mire of doping. Said LeMond: "It is now or never to act. After the earthquake caused by the Armstrong case another chance will not arise. I am willing to invest to make this institution more democratic, transparent and look for the best candidate in the longer term." McQuaid rejected LeMond's call for new leadership and was dismissive of LeMond. Ultimately, McQuaid was defeated in his bid for a third term by British Cycling president Brian Cookson at the September 2013 UCI Congress in Florence, Italy. LeMond had supported Cookson in the UCI Presidential battle.

In an interview with Anderson Cooper in October 2013, LeMond was asked if Armstrong perpetrated the greatest fraud in the history of sports. LeMond stated:

"Absolutely. Absolutely. The greatest fraud was that -- I mean, I know his physical capability. He is a top 30 at best. I mean, at best. No matter what. If he was clean, everybody was clean, he was top 30 at best. He is not capable of, not -- capable of the top five."

LeMond added, "He manipulated the cancer community. I mean, I have family members with cancer. Everybody has been affected -- by cancer. But it was the manipulation and using that as -- a way to, like, it was like Teflon. He used the money, he used the foundation to -- not only cover for him but also destroy people." Cooper then asked LeMond what should happen to Armstrong before LeMond said that Armstrong should go to jail, and LeMond said, "This is not a sporting infraction. This is criminal."

== Personal life ==
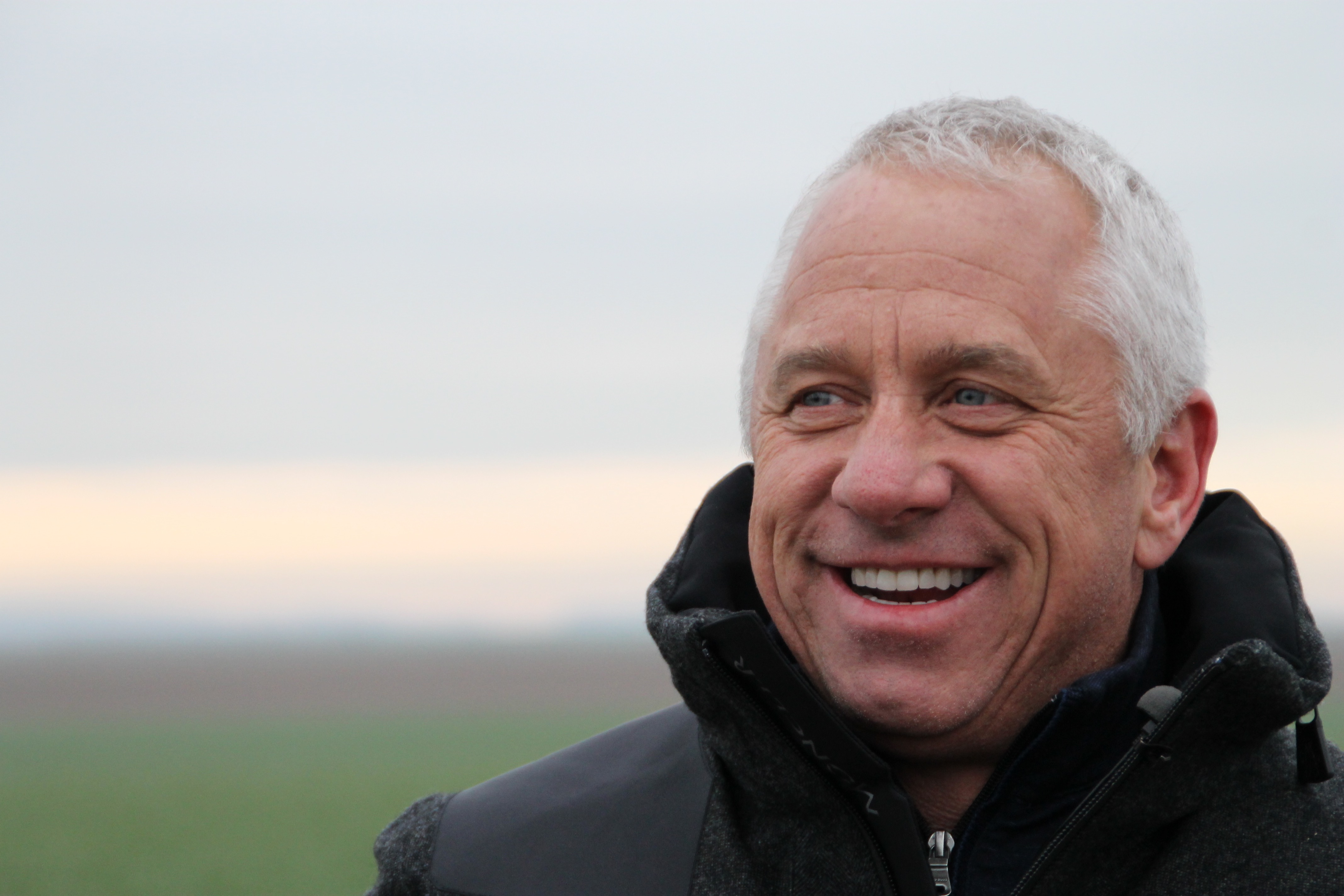
LeMond at Carrefour de l'Arbre, near Roubaix, in 2015

LeMond is married to Kathy (née Morris) and they have three children together: Geoffrey, Scott, and Simone. LeMond and his wife lived in Medina, Minnesota, from 1990 until 2017 and then moved to Oak Ridge, Tennessee. Since his retirement, LeMond has become increasingly involved in philanthropic efforts relating to causes that have affected him personally (including ADHD and sexual abuse). He is Catholic.

LeMond is an avid outdoor enthusiast and fly angler, and in 1991 – while still racing full-time – he made the world-record fly fishing catch of a four-pound smallmouth bass on a reel with a four-pound tippet. The record was certified by the National Freshwater Fishing Hall of Fame in Hayward, Wisconsin. The catch exceeded the then-previous record of three pounds, six ounces made on the same size tippet back in 1986. He was guided by Jim Mergen while staying at Eagle Knob Resort on Lake Owen. LeMond confessed, "I always pack my fly fishing equipment when I travel to bike events. I fish every chance I get."

After retiring from pro cycling, LeMond competed in Formula Ford 2000 series auto racing. He is also a motivational speaker. LeMond narrated an award-winning documentary for Adventures for the Cure in 2008.

On July 16, 2007, LeMond rode the L'Étape du Tour cyclosportive with his son, and found it to be a defining moment in his post-competition life. "I had the time of my life", he said, despite getting "650th place" and being "impressed that I even finished". LeMond continued, "I decided that day that nobody's going to keep me from cycling, not Trek, not Armstrong, not Verbruggen, not anybody." At the time, LeMond was alluding to a series of public and private disputes related to his anti-doping advocacy that hampered his enjoyment of cycling. Especially significant was LeMond's appearance as a USADA witness in the Floyd Landis doping case. At that time, Landis's business manager threatened to expose the fact that LeMond was a survivor of child sex abuse.

"I wanted to be seen as a good person, and never wanted to let people down, but I found it hard to handle the fame or adulation. I didn't feel worthy of it. I was ashamed by who I thought I was because I felt partly responsible [for the abuse] and I was never able to enjoy the stuff I should have been able to enjoy. My first thought when I won the Tour was: 'My God, I'm going to be famous', and then I thought, 'He's going to call'. I was always waiting for that phone call. I lived in fear that anyone would ever find out."

— Greg LeMond explaining how he felt about the fame he acquired.

Several weeks later, LeMond and his wife Kathy gave an extensive interview to Paul Kimmage of The Sunday Times. LeMond provided additional details concerning the circumstances of his 2001 apology to Armstrong, stating that Trek, the longtime manufacturer and distributor of LeMond Racing Cycles, had threatened to end the relationship at the behest of Armstrong if he did not apologize. LeMond described the two years following the apology as the worst in his life, marked by self-destructive behavior; ultimately, that behavior led LeMond to tell his wife that he was a survivor of child sex abuse and to seek help in addressing that past trauma. LeMond described how being a victim of molestation had impacted his life and his racing career. In September 2007, LeMond became a founding board member of the non-profit organization 1in6.org, whose mission is "to help men who have had unwanted or abusive sexual experiences in childhood live healthy, happy lives".

LeMond was in a car accident on the morning of January 30, 2013. He lost control of his car while driving through wintery and icy conditions to his dentist in Wayzata, Minnesota. LeMond suffered a concussion and was left with no memory of the incident. According to Associated Press, a Plymouth police report says LeMond left the road, hit a fence and shrubs, and then hit an embankment before ending up in the backyard of a home. LeMond may have lost consciousness before the accident, according to his wife Kathy, and he suffered a compression fracture in his back and would have to wear a brace for three months. The accident curtailed LeMond's public appearances in the first half of 2013, but he made a full recovery.

On September 19, 2019, the United States House of Representatives passed a bipartisan bill, submitted by California Representative Mike Thompson, to award LeMond the Congressional Gold Medal. The bill was approved by Congress on November 16, 2020, and signed by president Donald Trump on December 4. Upon signature of the bill, the White House released a statement, saying the medal was awarded to LeMond "in recognition of his service to the Nation as an athlete, activist, role model, and community leader."

In June 2022, LeMond was diagnosed with non-life-threatening leukemia.

On July 9, 2025, LeMond received the Congressional Gold Medal from Speaker of the House Mike Johnson at a ceremony in the U.S. Capitol's National Statuary Hall.

== Career achievements ==
=== Major results ===
1977
1st Road race, National Junior Road Championships
1978
1st Overall Vuelta de Bisbee
2nd Road race, National Junior Road Championships
3rd Team time trial, UCI Junior Road World Championships
1979
1st Road race, UCI Junior Road World Championships
1st Road race, National Junior Road Championships
1st Nevada City Classic
2nd Individual pursuit, UCI Junior Track World Championships
3rd Team time trial, UCI Junior Road World Championships
1980
1st Overall Circuit de la Sarthe
1st Nevada City Classic
3rd Overall Circuit des Ardennes
1981
1st Overall Coors Classic

1st Stages 1 & 7

Tour de Picardie

1st Stages 2 & 2a

1st Nevada City Classic
3rd Overall Critérium du Dauphiné Libéré
3rd Overall Route du Sud
7th Overall Circuit de la Sarthe
1982
1st Overall Tour de l'Avenir

1st Stages 4 (ITT), 5 & 8 (ITT)

2nd Road race, UCI Road World Championships
2nd Overall Tour Méditerranéen
3rd Overall Tirreno–Adriatico

1st Stage 3

3rd Overall Tour de Corse
3rd Grand Prix de Rennes
1983
1st Road race, UCI Road World Championships
1st Overall Critérium du Dauphiné Libéré

1st Stages 1, 5 & 7b (ITT)

1st Overall Super Prestige Pernod International
1st Critérium des As
1st Stage 1 Tour Méditerranéen
2nd Grand Prix des Nations
2nd Giro di Lombardia
4th Overall Tour de Suisse
4th Paris–Tours
6th Druivenkoers Overijse
10th Overall Tirreno–Adriatico
1984
1st Stage 1 Clásico RCN
3rd Overall Tour de France

1st Young rider classification
1st Stage 3 (TTT)

3rd Overall Critérium du Dauphiné Libéré

1st Stage 7b

3rd Liège–Bastogne–Liège
5th Overall Tirreno–Adriatico
7th Overall Ronde van Nederland
8th Overall Critérium International
9th Gent–Wevelgem
1985
1st Overall Coors Classic

1st Stage 5

2nd Overall Tour de France

1st Combination classification
1st Stages 3 (TTT) & 21 (ITT)

2nd Road race, UCI Road World Championships
2nd Overall Tour of the Basque Country
3rd Overall Giro d'Italia
3rd Super Prestige Pernod International
4th Overall Critérium International
4th Paris–Roubaix
4th Omloop Het Volk
6th Overall Tour Méditerranéen
7th Tour of Flanders
7th Grand Prix Eddy Merckx
1986
1st Overall Tour de France

1st Combination classification
1st Stage 13

1st Stage 4 Volta a la Comunitat Valenciana
2nd Milan–San Remo
2nd Super Prestige Pernod International
2nd Overall Coors Classic

1st Stage 4a

3rd Overall Paris–Nice
3rd Overall Tour de Suisse
3rd Overall Critérium International
4th Overall Giro d'Italia

1st Stage 5

4th La Flèche Wallonne
4th Züri-Metzgete
7th Overall Étoile de Bessèges
7th Road race, UCI Road World Championships
1989
1st Road race, UCI Road World Championships
1st Overall Tour de France

1st Stages 5 (ITT), 19 & 21 (ITT)

2nd Boucles de l'Aulne
4th Overall Critérium International
4th Grand Prix des Amériques
6th Overall Tirreno–Adriatico
1990
1st Overall Tour de France
2nd Züri-Metzgete
3rd Boucles de l'Aulne
4th Road race, UCI Road World Championships
10th Overall Tour de Suisse
1991
7th Overall Tour de France

Held after Stage 1 & 8–11
Held after Stages 1 & 2

1992
1st Overall Tour DuPont

1st Prologue

2nd Overall Tour d'Armorique
9th Paris–Roubaix

==== Grand Tour general classification results timeline ====
Grand Tour	1983	1984	1985	1986	1987	1988	1989	1990	1991	1992	1993	1994
Vuelta a España	DNF	—	—	—	—	—	—	—	—	—	—	—
Giro d'Italia	—	—	3	4	—	DNF	39	105	DNF	—	DNF	—
Tour de France	—	3	2	1	—	—	1	1	7	DNF	—	DNF

==== Classics results timeline ====
Monument	1981	1982	1983	1984	1985	1986	1987	1988	1989	1990	1991	1992	1993	1994
Milan–San Remo	—	17	30	—	—	2	—	—	—	—	—	22	—	140
Tour of Flanders	—	—	—	15	7	11	—	30	63	—	—	—	25	—
Paris–Roubaix	—	—	—	—	4	30	—	—	—	—	55	9	—	—
Liège–Bastogne–Liège	—	—	78	3	17	14	—	—	—	—	—	—	—	—
Giro di Lombardia	—	—	2	—	—	—	—	—	—	—	—	—	—	—

==== Major championships timeline ====
	1981	1982	1983	1984	1985	1986	1987	1988	1989	1990	1991	1992	1993	1994
World Championships	47	2	1	27	2	7	—	—	1	4	DNF	—	—	—

Legend
—	Did not compete
DNF	Did not finish

=== Awards ===
- Sports Illustrated Sportsman of the Year: 1989
- Jesse Owens International Trophy: 1991
- Korbel Lifetime Achievement Award: 1992

== See also ==
- Yellow jersey statistics
- List of companies named after people
- List of French Americans
- List of Grand Tour general classification winners
- List of multi-sport athletes
- List of people from Minnesota
- List of sports rivalries
- List of Tour de France general classification winners
- List of Tour de France secondary classification winners
- United States at the UCI Road World Championships
