= Giuseppe Saronni =

Italian cyclist (born 1957)

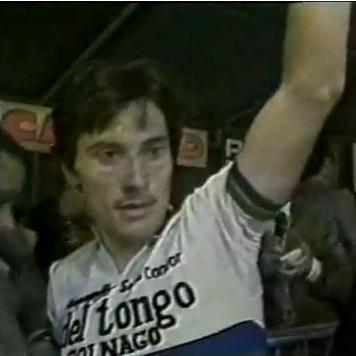
- Saronni in 1983

Personal information
- Full name: Giuseppe Saronni
- Nicknames: Beppe; La fucilata di Goodwood (The gunshot of Goodwood)
- Born: 22 September 1957 (age 69) Novara, Italy
- Height: 1.70 m (5 ft 7 in)
- Weight: 68 kg (150 lb)

Cycling career
- Sport: Cycling
- Current team: UAE Team Emirates XRG
- Discipline: Road
- Role: Rider (retired); Team manager Advisor
- Rider type: All-rounder

Professional teams
- 1977–1979: Scic
- 1980–1981: Gis Gelati
- 1982–1988: Del Tongo
- 1989: Malvor–Sidi
- 1990: Diana–Colnago–Animex

Managerial teams
- 1992–1996: Lampre–Colnago
- 1997–1998: Mapei–GB
- 1999–: Lampre–Daikin

Major wins
- Grand Tours Giro d'Italia General classification (1979, 1983) Points classification (1979, 1980, 1981, 1983) 24 individual stages (1978–1983, 1985) 3 TTT stages (1985, 1986, 1988) Vuelta a España 2 Individual stages (1983) Stage races Tour de Suisse (1982) Tour de Romandie (1979) Tirreno–Adriatico (1978, 1982) One-day races and Classics World Road Race Championships (1982) National Road Race Championships (1980) Giro di Lombardia (1982) Milan–San Remo (1983) La Flèche Wallonne (1980)
Medal record
Representing Italy
Men's road cycling
World Championships
Gold medal – first place	1982 Goodwood	Road race
Silver medal – second place	1981 Prague	Road race
Bronze medal – third place	1986 Colorado Springs	Road race

Giuseppe Saronni (born 22 September 1957), also known as Beppe Saronni, is an Italian former racing cyclist. He had remarkable success riding in the Giro d'Italia. In 1980 he won 7 stages and finished 7th overall; in 1981 he won 3 stages and finished 3rd overall. In 1979 and 1983 he won the Giro d'Italia and all total for his career win 24 stages in this race.

Saronni currently works as an advisor for UCI WorldTeam UAE Team Emirates XRG.

== Career ==
Born in Novara, Piedmont, Saronni turned professional in 1977. During his career, which lasted until 1989, he won 193 races. In Italy, he gave birth to a famous rivalry with Francesco Moser, like those of Alfredo Binda with Learco Guerra, and Fausto Coppi with Gino Bartali. He competed in the team pursuit event at the 1976 Summer Olympics.

In 1982, he won the World Cycling Championship at Goodwood, England, beating American Greg LeMond and Irishman Sean Kelly. His final sprint was so impressive that it gained him the nickname of La fucilata di Goodwood - "the gunshot of Goodwood". The previous year he had won a silver medal, as he had been overcome in the final by Freddy Maertens of Belgium. In 1982, Saronni also won the Giro di Lombardia.

At the beginning of 1983, another striking attack on the Poggio climb gave him the Milan–San Remo classic, after three consecutive second places in that race. This was Saronni's last great classics victory.

== Career achievements ==
=== Major results ===
1977
1st Giro del Veneto
1st Tre Valli Varesine
1st Giro del Friuli
1st Trofeo Pantalica
2nd La Flèche Wallonne
2nd Giro del Piemonte
2nd Coppa Placci
2nd Trofeo Laigueglia
3rd Overall Tirreno–Adriatico
3rd Overall Giro di Puglia
3rd Giro del Lazio
3rd Giro della Provincia di Reggio Calabria
4th Gran Premio Città di Camaiore
5th Giro dell'Emilia
7th Coppa Bernocchi
8th Overall Grand Prix du Midi Libre
8th Overall Giro di Sardegna
8th Trofeo Matteotti
9th Road race, UCI Road World Championships
9th Gran Premio Industria e Commercio di Prato
10th Milano–Torino
1978
1st Overall Tirreno–Adriatico

1st Prologue

1st Overall Giro di Puglia

1st Stages 1 & 3b (ITT)

1st Overall Ruota d'Oro

1st Stage 2

1st Coppa Agostoni
1st Trofeo Pantalica
1st Giro di Campania
1st Stage 4 Giro di Sardegna
2nd Milan–San Remo
2nd Coppa Sabatini
2nd Giro del Friuli
3rd Road race, National Road Championships
3rd Giro dell'Appennino
4th Overall Escalada a Montjuïc

1st Stage 1a (ITT)

4th Road race, UCI Road World Championships
4th Giro dell'Emilia
4th Trofeo Laigueglia
5th Overall Giro d'Italia

1st Stages 2, 7 & 8

6th Giro di Toscana
7th Eschborn–Frankfurt
1979
1st Overall Giro d'Italia

1st Points classification
1st Stages 5, 8 (ITT) & 19 (ITT)

1st Overall Tour de Romandie

1st Stages 1 & 4

1st Overall Grand Prix du Midi Libre

1st Prologue & Stage 1

1st Züri–Metzgete
1st Grand Prix of Aargau Canton
1st Tre Valli Varesine
1st Trofeo Baracchi (with Francesco Moser)
1st Gran Premio Città di Camaiore
1st Prologue Volta a Catalunya
2nd Tirreno–Adriatico

1st Stage 4

2nd Overall Ruota d'Oro

1st Stage 1

2nd Milan–San Remo
2nd La Flèche Wallonne
2nd Paris–Tours
2nd Giro di Campania
2nd Trofeo Laigueglia
4th Coppa Agostoni
4th Coppa Placci
5th Vuelta a Andalucía

1st Stage 5

5th GP Industria & Artigianato di Larciano
5th Trofeo Pantalica
8th Milano–Torino
8th Road race, UCI Road World Championships
10th Giro dell'Emilia
1980
1st Road race, National Road Championships
1st Overall Giro di Puglia

1st Stages 1, 4 & 5

1st La Flèche Wallonne
1st Tre Valli Varesine
1st Coppa Bernocchi
1st Trittico Lombardo
1st Trofeo Pantalica
1st Giro di Campania
1st GP Industria & Artigianato di Larciano
1st Stage 1 Ruota d'Oro
2nd Milan–San Remo
2nd Coppa Sabatini
3rd Overall Tour de Romandie

1st Prologue

3rd Giro del Lazio
4th Züri–Metzgete
5th Milano–Vignola
6th Overall Tirreno–Adriatico

1st Stage 3

6th Overall Giro di Sardegna
7th Overall Giro d'Italia

1st Points classification
1st Stages 1, 2, 3, 13, 17, 19 & 21 (ITT)

7th Trofeo Matteotti
1981
1st Giro di Romagna
1st Trofeo Laigueglia
1st Coppa Bernocchi
1st Gran Premio Città di Camaiore
1st Giro dell'Etna
1st Stage 1a Escalada a Montjuïc
1st Stage 3 Deutschland Tour
1st Stage 2 Ruota d'Oro
1st Stage 5 La Méditerranéenne
Tirreno–Adriatico

1st Stages 2 & 3

Giro di Puglia

1st Stages 1 & 2

2nd Overall Tour de Romandie

1st Stages 2 & 3

2nd Road race, UCI Road World Championships
2nd Gran Premio Industria e Commercio di Prato
3rd Overall Giro d'Italia

1st Points classification
1st Stages 3, 5 & 6

3rd Giro del Friuli
9th Gent–Wevelgem
1982
1st Road race, UCI Road World Championships
1st Overall Tour de Suisse

1st Stage 1

1st Overall Tirreno–Adriatico

1st Stages 1 & 2

1st Overall Giro del Trentino

1st Stage 3

1st Overall Giro di Sardegna

1st Stages 1, 2 & 4

1st Giro di Lombardia
1st Milano–Torino
1st Coppa Agostoni
1st Coppa Sabatini
1st Trofeo Pantalica
1st Stage 1 Deutschland Tour
1st Stage 1 Ruota d'Oro
Vuelta a Andalucía

1st Stages 1, 2, 4a & 5

2nd Giro del Friuli
6th Overall Giro d'Italia

1st Stages 2, 9 & 21

6th Paris–Brussels
7th La Flèche Wallonne
1983
1st Overall Giro d'Italia

1st Points classification
1st Stages 4, 13 (ITT) & 16b

1st Milan–San Remo
Vuelta a España

1st Stages 9 & 10

2nd Liège–Bastogne–Liège
5th Trofeo Pantalica
1984
Tour of Norway

1st Stages 3 & 5

1985
1st Trofeo Pantalica
1st Stage 3 Giro di Puglia
1st Stage 1 Vuelta a Andalucía
Giro d'Italia

1st Stages 2 (TTT), 3 & 16

2nd Tre Valli Varesine
3rd Overall Settimana Internazionale di Coppi e Bartali

1st Stage 3

1986
1st Overall Settimana Internazionale di Coppi e Bartali

1st Stage 3

1st Trofeo Baracchi (with Lech Piasecki)
2nd Overall Giro d'Italia

1st Stage 3 (TTT)

2nd Overall Giro di Puglia

1st Stages 2 & 4

3rd Road race, UCI Road World Championships
4th Milan–San Remo
1987
1st Milano–Vignola
1st Stage 4 Tirreno–Adriatico
2nd Trofeo Baracchi
1988
1st Overall Giro di Puglia

1st Stage 1

1st Tre Valli Varesine
1st Stage 4b (TTT) Giro d'Italia
2nd Overall Settimana Internazionale di Coppi e Bartali
2nd Road race, National Road Championships
2nd Coppa Placci
10th Overall Vuelta a Andalucía

1st Stage 2

1989
1st Prologue Vuelta a Andalucía
2nd Giro di Romagna
1990
1st Giro della Provincia di Reggio Calabria

=== Grand Tour general classification results timeline ===
Grand Tour	1978	1979	1980	1981	1982	1983	1984	1985	1986	1987	1988	1989	1990
Vuelta a España	—	—	—	—	—	DNF	DNF	—	—	—	—	DNF	DNF
Giro d'Italia	5	1	7	3	6	1	16	15	2	DNF	27	75	45
Tour de France	—	—	—	—	—	—	—	—	—	DNF	—	—	—

=== Monuments results timeline ===
Monument	1977	1978	1979	1980	1981	1982	1983	1984	1985	1986	1987	1988	1989	1990
Milan–San Remo	19	2	2	2	33	—	1	30	51	4	80	44	91	47
Tour of Flanders	Did not contest during career													
Paris–Roubaix	Did not contest during career													
Liège–Bastogne–Liège	—	—	28	—	—	—	2	—	—	—	—	—	—	—
Giro di Lombardia	14	11	19	—	15	1	39	—	—	—	—	—	—	—

=== Major championships results timeline ===
Championship	1977	1978	1979	1980	1981	1982	1983	1984	1985	1986	1987	1988	1989	1990
World Championships	9	4	8	DNF	2	1	17	—	24	3	48	59	—	—
National Championships	—	3	—	1	—	—	—	—	—	—	—	2	—	—

Legend
—	Did not compete
DNF	Did not finish
