= Floyd Landis doping case =

2006 doping scandal

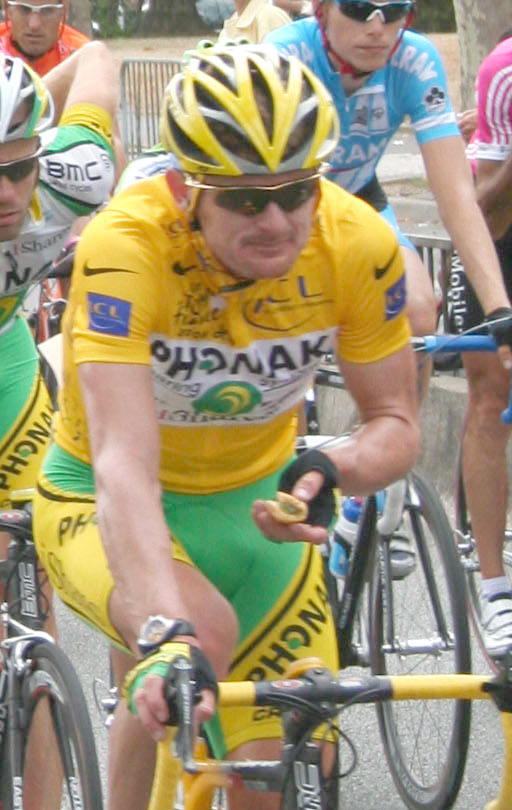
Floyd Landis on the Tour de France on July 23, 2006

The Floyd Landis doping case was a doping scandal that featured Floyd Landis, the initial winner of the 2006 Tour de France. After a meltdown in Stage 16, where he had lost ten minutes, Landis came back in Stage 17, riding solo and passing his whole team. However, a urine sample taken from Landis immediately after his Stage 17 win twice tested positive for banned synthetic testosterone as well as a ratio of testosterone to epitestosterone nearly three times the limit allowed by World Anti-Doping Agency rules. The International Cycling Union stripped him of his 2006 Tour title. Second place finisher Óscar Pereiro was officially declared the winner. The only previous Tour de France winner to be disqualified at the time was the 1904 Tour's winner, Maurice Garin; however, in the following years Alberto Contador and Lance Armstrong would have tour wins revoked.

== Prelude ==
Landis was wearing the yellow jersey as leader of the general classification prior to Stage 16, but then lost eight minutes and seemed finished. However, Landis spectacularly came back in Stage 17, winning the stage and cutting his deficit to leader Óscar Pereiro to half a minute. Overtaking him after the Stage 19 time trial, Landis was celebrated as the winner of the 2006 Tour de France.

== Doping accusation ==
On July 27, 2006, four days after the Tour had finished, the Phonak cycling team announced Landis had a urine test come back positive, having an unusually high ratio of the hormone testosterone to the hormone epitestosterone (T/E ratio) after his epic performance in Stage 17. Landis denied having doped and placed faith in a test using his backup sample. Phonak stated that he would be dismissed should the backup sample also test positive. It did, and Landis was suspended from professional cycling and dismissed from his team. Landis's personal physician Arnie Baker later disclosed that his test had found a T/E ratio of first 12:1, later 11:1, far above the maximum allowable ratio of 4:1. The test on Landis's Stage 17 A sample had been performed by the French government's anti-doping clinical laboratory, the National Laboratory for Doping Detection (LNDD), which was a division of the Ministry of Youth, Sport, and Social Life and accredited by the World Anti-Doping Agency (WADA). The B sample confirmed the A sample, and also tested positive for an unnatural source of testosterone.

Following the reported positive drug test on his A sample, Landis suggested that the results had been improperly released by the UCI. On August 9, 2006, UCI president Pat McQuaid rejected the claim, saying, "We acted correctly. We informed the team, the rider, and the federation that there had been an irregularity. Then we issued a press release saying that an unnamed rider had been found positive in the Tour. Landis's team published his name, two days later... I have full faith in that laboratory, and there are stringent measures kept in place by the anti-doping agencies to ensure they proceed correctly."

Floyd Landis wrote a book titled Positively False, which contained his personal account of the case and in which he maintained his innocence. However, in May 2010 Floyd Landis confessed to doping and accused Lance Armstrong of doing the same, contradicting the entire premise of the book.

== USADA arbitration ==
On May 14, 2007 an arbitration hearing began between the United States Anti-Doping Agency (USADA) and Landis regarding the doping allegations. On September 20, the arbitrators found Landis guilty of doping.

=== "Whisky defense" ===
On August 1, 2006, The New York Times reported that, according to a UCI source, Landis's urine test had revealed synthetic testosterone in his body. Despite this, Landis claimed his innocence, promising to "explain to the world why this is not a doping case, but a natural occurrence" and that the testosterone in his body was "natural and produced by my own organism." The variety of explanations offered up by Landis provided fodder for many skeptical columns by sports journalists and inspiration for comedians such as David Letterman, who presented the "Top 10 Floyd Landis Excuses" on his show. Several experts have refuted Landis's assertions. Landis at first blamed consumption of whisky for his unusual results, an approach that was widely ridiculed. Prof. Christiane Ayotte, director of Montreal's anti-doping laboratory, said that, "In 25 years of experience of testing testosterone ... such a huge increase in the level of testosterone cannot be expected to come from any natural factors." David Black, a forensic toxicologist for Nashville-based Aegis Sciences, said, "There are not hundreds of plausible explanations. If the tests were so unreliable that there were hundreds of possible reasons, there would be no point in performing the tests." Landis later backtracked from some of the assertions, saying, "The whisky idea was not mine and the dehydration was a theory from the lawyers I hired in Spain to represent me."

=== Alternative theory ===
There is evidence to suggest Landis' positive test was the result of one or several blood transfusions administered to him during the course of that year's Tour. This might explain why Landis was not flagged for testosterone in tests after earlier stages, and only came up positive after the infamous Stage 17 breakaway. After a collapse on Stage 16 that saw him lose considerable time to his rivals, it is possible Landis received a blood transfusion that was tainted with testosterone still in his body when the blood was initially drawn. This also might explain the variance in his T/E ratio results from tests during the tour, and the abnormal (and technically exculpatory) confirmatory findings from the CIR test.

On September 8, 2006, Landis's attorney announced that he would formally request that the case be dropped on the grounds that LNDD's 370-page report revealed inconsistencies in the way the samples were handled.

=== Exogenous testosterone ===
Media reports said that synthetic testosterone had been detected in the A sample, using the carbon isotope ratio test, CIR, conducted at LNDD. The presence of synthetic testosterone means that some of the testosterone in Landis's body came from an external source and was not naturally produced by his own system. These results conflicted with Landis's public assertion that it was a natural occurrence.

The CIR test is used to distinguish between testosterone produced naturally by the athlete's body and synthetic testosterone introduced from an outside source. The test is performed by Isotope Ratio Mass Spectrometry (IRMS). According to Gary I. Wadler, M.D., a member of the World Anti-Doping Agency, the carbon isotope ratio test needs to be done only once, on either an A or on a B sample, particularly if the athlete's T/E ratio is high as in Landis's case.

It has been suggested that Landis may have been using testosterone over the long term but was either masking it or diluting it to avoid detection. The positive test result would therefore have been from a mistake with the alleged doping program on one day. Landis gave a total of eight samples during the 2006 Tour. As part of its prosecution, USADA had remaining "B" portions of the other samples tested by the LNDD. Four of those samples also showed the presence of synthetic testosterone.

=== Appeals ===
On September 11, 2006, Landis asked an USADA review board to dismiss the doping charges against him. His request was made on the basis that the A and B urine samples from Stage 17 did not meet the established WADA criteria for a positive doping offense. Landis's lawyer said in a statement: "The single testosterone/epitestosterone analysis in this case is replete with fundamental, gross errors." The lawyer also claimed that the positive finding on the B sample came from a sample number not assigned to Landis. The review board notified Landis on September 18 of its recommendation that USADA proceed with the disciplinary process. Howard Jacobs, attorney for Landis, requested an open hearing by the American Arbitration Association to contest potential sanctions against the athlete.

=== Arnie Baker ===
On April 14, 2009, the French newspaper L'Express reported information that had been obtained from hacking into the LNDD was sent to a Canadian counterpart lab from a computer registered to Arnie Baker, Landis' former coach. The French police later invited Landis and Baker to attend a court hearing to answer questions regarding the issue. On July 31, 2009, The New York Times featured an article on corporate spying in France, stating that, "No evidence has surfaced to connect Mr. Landis or Dr. Baker to the hacking, and each has denied any involvement."

== Verdict ==
On September 20, 2007, Landis' doping accusation was upheld by an American Arbitration Association tribunal by a 2-1 vote. Landis was subsequently banned for two years. In response to this, the International Cycling Union formally stripped him of his 2006 Tour de France title and second-place finisher Óscar Pereiro was officially declared the winner. The only previous Tour de France winner to be disqualified was 1904 Tour de France winner, Maurice Garin.

Landis was also banned from the sport for two years, dated retroactively to January 2007. Even before the USADA's ruling on this matter, the controversy resulted in the disbandment of Landis's former team, Phonak.

Landis agreed not to participate in any racing in France in 2007 to allow him to postpone a hearing of his case there for as long as possible. On December 19, 2007, the French Anti-Doping Agency found him guilty of doping, and issued a two-year suspension, which barred him from racing in France until early 2009.

After this verdict, Landis tried to reverse this decision at the Court of Arbitration for Sport. On June 20, 2008, he lost this appeal. In September 2008 Landis moved in U.S. federal court to vacate the CAS arbitration award, contending that the procurement of the award was tainted by partiality and conflicts of interest. Additionally, Landis contested the $100,000 US "costs" award, characterizing it as a disguised punitive award. In December 2008 Landis and the USADA reached a settlement and agreed to withdraw the case with prejudice, leading some to believe that the USADA waived the $100,000 fine in return for the cessation of litigation. Regardless of the reasons for dismissing the case, litigation is now complete and final.

== Reaction among cyclists ==
After Landis' A sample tested positive for testosterone, retired American cyclist and three-time Tour de France winner Greg LeMond doubted whether additional doping tests would reverse Landis's earlier results. He stated,

"I hope the sampling comes back negative; unfortunately, I think the labs in Europe are very professional."

Fellow professional and 10 time Tour de France cyclist, Australian Stuart O'Grady, left no doubt as to his view in an interview for the Australian 60 Minutes program televised on 22 July 2007. The reporter Liz Hayes asked O'Grady: "Would anyone have picked that — that the winner of last year's race was a drug cheat?" O'Grady replied,

"I would have, because I was there with him that day when he was in that breakaway. I was actually 13 minutes ahead of him and he caught us on his own and then he basically rode us all off the wheel..... I thought that was impossible, what he did. I'm not a bad bike rider and, you know, he made me look like a little kid."

=== Support from Lance Armstrong ===
On July 28, 2006, Landis appeared on Larry King Live to explain his situation and reiterate his innocence. Lance Armstrong, the seven-time and subsequently disgraced former Tour de France winner, phoned the show to express support for Landis, his former teammate. Armstrong expressed skepticism of the French laboratory that conducted Landis's drug test, noting it is the same laboratory involved in some of the doping allegations against him.

Armstrong continuously expressed support for Landis and stated his conviction that the process is biased against athletes.
