= 1986 UCI Road World Championships – Men's road race =

Men's Individual Road Race
1986 UCI Road World Championships
- Rainbow jersey

Race details
- Dates: 6 September 1986
- Stages: 1
- Distance: 261.8 km (162.7 mi)
- Winning time: 6h 32' 38"

Results
	Winner	Moreno Argentin (ITA)	(Italy)
	Second	Charly Mottet (FRA)	(France)
	Third	Giuseppe Saronni (ITA)	(Italy)

The men's road race at the 1986 UCI Road World Championships was the 53rd edition of the event. The race took place on Sunday 6 September 1986 in Colorado Springs, United States. The race was won by Moreno Argentin of Italy.

== Final classification ==
General classification (1–10)

Rank	Rider	Time
1st place, gold medalist(s)	Moreno Argentin (ITA)	6h 32' 38"
2nd place, silver medalist(s)	Charly Mottet (FRA)	+ 1"
3rd place, bronze medalist(s)	Giuseppe Saronni (ITA)	+ 9"
4	Juan Fernández (ESP)	+ 9"
5	Sean Kelly (IRL)	+ 9"
6	Alfonso Gutiérrez (ESP)	+ 9"
7	Greg LeMond (USA)	+ 9"
8	Jesper Worre (DEN)	+ 9"
9	Ludo Peeters (BEL)	+ 9"
10	Federico Echave (ESP)	+ 9"
