= 1983 Grand Prix d'Automne =

Race details
- Dates: 9 October 1983
- Stages: 1
- Distance: 249 km (154.7 mi)
- Winning time: 5h 27' 25"

Results
	Winner	Ludo Peeters (BEL)
	Second	Adri van der Poel (NED)
	Third	Jan Raas (NED)

The 1983 Grand Prix d'Automne was the 77th edition of the Paris–Tours cycle race and was held on 9 October 1983. The race started in Blois and finished in Chaville. The race was won by Ludo Peeters.

== General classification ==
Final general classification

Rank	Rider	Time
1	Ludo Peeters (BEL)	5h 27' 25"
2	Adri van der Poel (NED)	+ 0"
3	Jan Raas (NED)	+ 28"
4	Greg LeMond (USA)	+ 28"
5	Silvano Contini (ITA)	+ 28"
6	Jean-Marie Wampers (BEL)	+ 28"
7	Stephen Roche (IRL)	+ 3' 54"
8	Ferdi Van Den Haute (BEL)	+ 4' 01"
9	Sean Kelly (IRL)	+ 4' 01"
10	Luc Colijn (BEL)	+ 4' 01"
