= Arjan Jagt =

Dutch cyclist (born 1966)

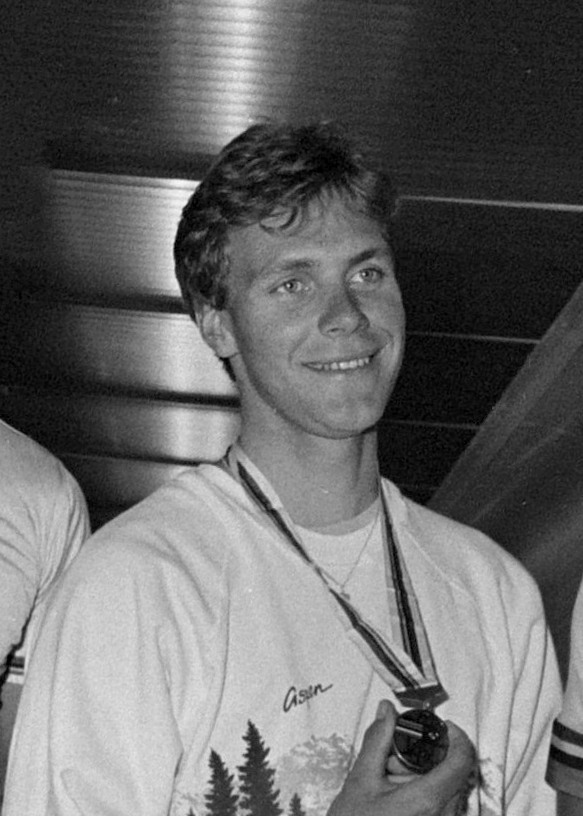
- Arjan Jagt in 1986

Personal information
- Born: 1 September 1966 (age 60) Assen, the Netherlands

Cycling career
- Sport: Cycling
- Current team: Retired
- Disciplines: Road; Track
- Role: Rider

Professional teams
- 1988–1989: Superconfex–Yoko–Opel–Colnago
- 1990–1991: Spago
Medal record
Representing the Netherlands
UCI Road World Championships
Bronze medal – third place	1986 Colorado Springs	Road race, amateur

Arjan Jagt (born 1 September 1966) is a Dutch retired cyclist who won the bronze medal in the road race at the 1986 UCI Road World Championships. He also won the Ronde van Limburg (1987), Grand Prix of Aargau Canton (1988) and one stage of Tour of Austria (1986).

== Major results ==
1985
3rd Overall Olympia's Tour
1986
2nd Overall Flèche du Sud
1987
1st Ronde van Limburg
1988
1st Grand Prix of Aargau Canton
1st Stage 4 International Tour of Hellas
1989
5th Le Samyn
