= GP Gippingen =

Swiss one-day road cycling race

Grand Prix of Aargau Canton

Race details
- Date: Early-June
- Region: Gippingen, Switzerland
- English name: Grand Prix of Aargau Canton
- Local name: Grosser Preis des Kantons Aargau (in German)
- Discipline: Road
- Competition: UCI Europe Tour
- Type: Single-day
- Organiser: Radsporttage Gippingen GmbH
- Web site: www.gippingen.ch

History
- First edition: 1964
- Editions: 62 (as of 2026)
- First winner: Jan Lauwers (BEL)
- Most wins: Alexander Kristoff (NOR) (3 wins)
- Most recent: Liam Slock (BEL)

Grand Prix of Aargau Canton (German: Grosser Preis des Kantons Aargau) is a semi classic European bicycle race held in Aargau canton, one of the more northerly cantons of Switzerland.

The race consists of fifteen laps around the Swiss town of Gippingen, which belongs to the municipality of Leuggern.

== Winners ==
Year	Country	Rider	Team
1964	Belgium	Jan Lauwers	Flandria–Romeo
1965	France	Jean Stablinski	Ford France–Gitane
1966	West Germany	Wilfried Peffgen	Ruberg-Continental
1967	Belgium	Edward Sels	Flandria–De Clerck
1968	Belgium	Willy Vekemans	Goldor–Gerka
1969	Belgium	Walter Godefroot	Flandria–De Clerck–Krüger
1970	Belgium	Erik De Vlaeminck	Flandria–Mars
1971	France	Michel Périn	Fagor–Mercier–Hutchinson
1972	Belgium	Georges Pintens	Van Cauter–Magniflex–de Gribaldy
1973	Italy	Marino Basso	Bianchi–Campagnolo
1974	Italy	Giacinto Santambrogio	Bianchi–Campagnolo
1975	Belgium	André Dierickx	Rokado
1976	Netherlands	Roy Schuiten	Lejeune–BP
1977	West Germany	Dietrich Thurau	TI–Raleigh
1978	Italy	Simone Fraccaro	Sanson–Campagnolo
1979	Italy	Giuseppe Saronni	Scic–Bottecchia
1980	Belgium	Patrick Pevenage	DAF Trucks–Lejeune
1981	Switzerland	Daniel Gisiger	Cilo–Aufina
1982	Netherlands	Jacques Hanegraaf	TI–Raleigh–Campagnolo
1983	Switzerland	Siegfried Hekimi	Eorotex–Magniflex
1984	Belgium	Ferdi Van Den Haute	La Redoute
1985	Switzerland	Urs Freuler	Atala
1986	Belgium	Frank Hoste	Fagor
1987	Netherlands	Adri van der Poel	PDM–Ultima–Concorde
1988	Netherlands	Arjan Jagt	Superconfex–Yoko–Opel–Colnago
1989	Italy	Paolo Rosola	Gewiss–Bianchi
1990	Netherlands	Adri van der Poel	Weinmann–SMM–Uster
1991	Belgium	Sammie Moreels	Lotto
1992	Germany	Uwe Ampler	Team Telekom
1993	Italy	Gianni Bugno	Gatorade–Mega Drive–Kenwood
1994	Switzerland	Pascal Richard	GB–MG Maglificio
1995	Switzerland	Pascal Richard	MG Maglificio–Technogym
1996	Italy	Fabrizio Guidi	Scrigno–Blue Storm
1997	Germany	Udo Bölts	Team Telekom
1998	Italy	Michele Bartoli	Asics–CGA
1999	Latvia	Romāns Vainšteins	Vini Caldirola
2000	Germany	Steffen Wesemann	Team Telekom
2001	Netherlands	Karsten Kroon	Rabobank
2002	Italy	Giuseppe Palumbo	De Nardi–Pasta Montegrappa
2003	Switzerland	Martin Elmiger	Rabobank
2004	Italy	Matteo Tosatto	Fassa Bortolo
2005	Switzerland	Alexandre Moos	Phonak
2006	Switzerland	Beat Zberg	Gerolsteiner
2007	France	John Gadret	AG2R Prévoyance
2008	France	Lloyd Mondory	Ag2r–La Mondiale
2009	Slovakia	Peter Velits	Team Milram
2010	Belgium	Kristof Vandewalle	Topsport Vlaanderen–Mercator
2011	Switzerland	Michael Albasini	Switzerland (national team)
2012	Uzbekistan	Sergey Lagutin	Vacansoleil–DCM
2013	Switzerland	Michael Albasini	Orica–GreenEDGE
2014	Germany	Simon Geschke	Giant–Shimano
2015	Norway	Alexander Kristoff	Team Katusha
2016	Italy	Giacomo Nizzolo	Trek–Segafredo
2017	Italy	Sacha Modolo	UAE Team Emirates
2018	Norway	Alexander Kristoff	UAE Team Emirates
2019	Norway	Alexander Kristoff	UAE Team Emirates
2020	No race due to the COVID-19 pandemic in Switzerland		
2021	Netherlands	Ide Schelling	Bora–Hansgrohe
2022	Switzerland	Marc Hirschi	UAE Team Emirates
2023	Belgium	Thibau Nys	Trek–Segafredo
2024	Belgium	Maxim Van Gils	Lotto–Dstny
2025	United States	Neilson Powless	EF Education–EasyPost
2026	Belgium	Liam Slock	Lotto–Intermarché
