= The Last Rider =

2022 documentary about Greg LeMond

- Theatrical release poster
- Directed by: Alex Holmes
- Screenplay by: Alex Holmes
- Produced by: James Erskine; Victoria Gregory; Sam Brayshaw
- Starring: Greg LeMond; Kathy LeMond; Cyrille Guimard; Pedro Delgado; Laurent Fignon
- Cinematography: Ryan Earl Parker; Tristan Chenais; Giuseppe Truppi
- Edited by: Paul Monaghan; Gibran Ramos
- Music by: Samuel Sim
- Production companies: MRC; New Black Films
- Distributed by: Roadside Attractions (United States); Dogwoof (United Kingdom)
- Release date: 2 September 2022 (Telluride)
- Running time: 96 minutes
- Countries: United States; United Kingdom
- Language: English
- Box office: $253,770

The Last Rider is a 2022 sports documentary film directed by Alex Holmes, about the American Tour De France winning cyclist Greg LeMond. It features contributions from LeMond himself, as well as his wife, and his former cycling manager, as well as his former teammates and rivals.

== Synopsis ==
Greg LeMond in 1986 became the first non-European professional cyclist to win the Tour de France. He then recovered from a near-fatal shooting accident during an off-season hunting trip to win the 1989 Tour de France in Paris, on the Champs-Élysées, in dramatic style. A winning margin after three weeks of racing of only eight seconds, over his former teammate Laurent Fignon, made it the closest finish in the history of the race.

== Cast ==
- Greg LeMond
- Kathy LeMond
- Cyrille Guimard
- Pedro Delgado
- Laurent Fignon (archive interviews)

== Production ==
The project was announced in June 2020. Directed by Alex Holmes, the film is produced by James Erskine, Victoria Gregory and Sam Brayshaw as a New Black Films production. The film features interviews with Greg and Kathy LeMond, French cycling director sportif Cyrille Guimard and Tour de France winner Pedro Delgado, as well as archive footage of interviews with the late double-Tour winner and Lemond rival Laurent Fignon.

== Release ==
The Last Rider premiered at the 2022 Telluride Film Festival. The film was released in select theatres on June 23, 2023 by Roadside Attractions.

== Reception ==
On the review aggregator website Rotten Tomatoes, The Last Rider holds an approval rating of 96% based on 23 reviews.

Wendy Ide for The Guardian said that Lemond made for a "likeable protagonist" and this combined with the thrilling denouncement made the film was "exciting and affecting". Kevin Maher in The Times gave the film four stars and described it as "more compelling than any sports fiction film".

== See also ==
- List of films about bicycles and cycling
