= Howard Jacobs =

American lawyer

Howard L. Jacobs is an American attorney in Westlake Village, California, who has represented 200 or more athletes in disciplinary cases involving anti-doping, salary disputes, team selection issues, and civil litigation matters. He has been consistently ranked by Chambers Guide USA as one of the leading sports lawyers.

== Clients include ==
- Tennis player Maria Sharapova in 2016
- Tennis player Simona Halep in 2023-2024
- UFC fighter Jon Jones in 2016
- UFC fighter Brock Lesnar in 2016
- Swimmer Park Tae Hwan in 2016 and 2015
- Track cyclist Bobby Lea in 2016
- Track & field athlete Veronica Campbell Brown in 2014
- Swimmer Yulia Efimova in 2014
- Tennis player Marin Cilic in 2013
- Basketball player Diana Taurasi in 2011
- Track & field athlete LaShawn Merritt in 2011
- Cyclist Floyd Landis (see Floyd Landis doping case)
- Track star Marion Jones in 2006
- Swimmer Jessica Hardy in 2008
- Runner Tim Montgomery
- Gymnast Ana Bărbosu in 2025
