= 1982 UCI Road World Championships – Men's road race =

Men's Individual Road Race
1982 UCI Road World Championships
- Rainbow jersey

Race details
- Dates: 5 September 1982
- Stages: 1
- Distance: 275.13 km (171.0 mi)
- Winning time: 6h 42' 22"

Results
	Winner	Giuseppe Saronni (ITA)	(Italy)
	Second	Greg LeMond (USA)	(United States)
	Third	Sean Kelly (IRL)	(Ireland)

The men's road race at the 1982 UCI Road World Championships was the 49th edition of the event. The race took place on Sunday 5 September 1982 and was based around the Goodwood Circuit, England. The race was won by Giuseppe Saronni of Italy.

== Final classification ==
General classification (1–10)

Rank	Rider	Time
1st place, gold medalist(s)	Giuseppe Saronni (ITA)	6h 42' 22"
2nd place, silver medalist(s)	Greg LeMond (USA)	+ 5"
3rd place, bronze medalist(s)	Sean Kelly (IRL)	+ 10"
4	Joop Zoetemelk (NED)	+ 10"
5	Marino Lejarreta (ESP)	+ 10"
6	Michel Pollentier (BEL)	+ 10"
7	Juan Fernández (ESP)	+ 10"
8	Klaus-Peter Thaler (FRG)	+ 10"
9	Pierino Gavazzi (ITA)	+ 10"
10	Jonathan Boyer (USA)	+ 10"
