= 1979 Tour de Romandie =

Race details
- Dates: 8–13 May 1979
- Stages: 5 + Prologue
- Distance: 853.8 km (530.5 mi)
- Winning time: 21h 49' 26"

Results
	Winner	Giuseppe Saronni (ITA)
	Second	Gianbattista Baronchelli (ITA)
	Third	Henk Lubberding (NED)

The 1979 Tour de Romandie was the 33rd edition of the Tour de Romandie cycle race and was held from 8 May to 13 May 1979. The race started in Neuchâtel and finished in Geneva. The race was won by Giuseppe Saronni.

== General classification ==
Final general classification
Rank	Rider	Time
1	Giuseppe Saronni (ITA)	21h 49' 26"
2	Gianbattista Baronchelli (ITA)	+ 1' 04"
3	Henk Lubberding (NED)	+ 1' 08"
4	Stefan Mutter (SUI)	+ 1' 20"
5	Sven-Åke Nilsson (SWE)	+ 2' 03"
6	Silvano Contini (ITA)	+ 2' 27"
7	Michel Laurent (FRA)	+ 2' 28"
8	Wladimiro Panizza (ITA)	+ 2' 52"
9	Claude Criquielion (BEL)	+ 3' 15"
10	Knut Knudsen (NOR)	+ 3' 15"
