= 1985 Omloop Het Volk =

Race details
- Dates: 2 March 1985
- Stages: 1
- Distance: 223 km (139 mi)
- Winning time: 6h 03' 00"

Results
| | Winner | Eddy Planckaert (BEL) |
| | Second | Jacques Hanegraaf (NED) |
| | Third | Jozef Lieckens (BEL) |

The 1985 Omloop Het Volk was the 40th edition of the Omloop Het Volk cycle race and was held on 2 March 1985. The race started and finished in Sint-Amandsberg. The race was won by Eddy Planckaert.

== General classification ==
Final general classification
| Rank | Rider | Time |
|---|---|---|
| 1 | Eddy Planckaert (BEL) | 6h 03' 00" |
| 2 | Jacques Hanegraaf (NED) | + 0" |
| 3 | Jozef Lieckens (BEL) | + 38" |
| 4 | Greg LeMond (USA) | + 38" |
| 5 | Adri van der Poel (NED) | + 38" |
| 6 | Luc Colijn (BEL) | + 3' 04" |
| 7 | Walter Planckaert (BEL) | + 3' 04" |
| 8 | Jan Bogaert (BEL) | + 3' 04" |
| 9 | Etienne De Wilde (BEL) | + 3' 04" |
| 10 | Adri van Houwelingen (NED) | + 3' 04" |
