= Marcel Russenberger =

Swiss cyclist

Personal information
- Born: 5 September 1958 (age 68) Merishausen, Switzerland

Cycling career
- Sport: Cycling
- Disciplines: Road; Cyclo-cross
- Role: Rider

Professional teams
- 1982–1985: Cilo–Aufina
- 1986: RMO–Cycles Méral–Mavic

Marcel Russenberger (born 5 September 1958) is a Swiss former professional racing cyclist. He rode in three editions of the Tour de France and the 1984 Giro d'Italia.

== Major results ==
1982
9th Overall Tirreno–Adriatico
10th Milano–Torino
10th Grand Prix d'Ouverture La Marseillaise
1983
6th Coppa Bernocchi
8th Milano–Torino
1985
2nd Ziklokross Igorre

=== Grand Tour general classification results timeline ===
Grand Tour	1982	1983	1984
Giro d'Italia	—	—	133
Tour de France	119	87	123
Vuelta a España	—	—	—

Legend
—	Did not compete
DNF	Did not finish
