= 1982 Tirreno–Adriatico =

Race details
- Dates: 13–18 March 1982
- Stages: 5 + Prologue
- Distance: 819.7 km (509.3 mi)
- Winning time: 21h 47' 22"

Results
	Winner	Giuseppe Saronni (ITA)	(Del Tongo)
	Second	Gerrie Knetemann (NED)	(TI–Raleigh–Campagnolo)
	Third	Greg LeMond (USA)	(Renault–Elf–Gitane)

The 1982 Tirreno–Adriatico was the 17th edition of the Tirreno–Adriatico cycle race and was held from 13 March to 18 March 1982. The race started in Cerenova Constantica and finished in San Benedetto del Tronto. The race was won by Giuseppe Saronni of the Del Tongo team.

== General classification ==
Final general classification

Rank	Rider	Team	Time
1	Giuseppe Saronni (ITA)	Del Tongo	21h 47' 22"
2	Gerrie Knetemann (NED)	TI–Raleigh–Campagnolo	+ 7"
3	Greg LeMond (USA)	Renault–Elf–Gitane	+ 27"
4	Francesco Moser (ITA)	Famcucine–Campagnolo	+ 29"
5	Gregor Braun (FRG)	Capri Sonne–Campagnolo–Merckx	+ 1' 02"
6	Daniel Willems (BEL)	Boule d'Or–Sunair	+ 1' 21"
7	Theo de Rooij (NED)	Capri Sonne–Campagnolo–Merckx	+ 1' 22"
8	Daniel Gisiger (SUI)	Hoonved–Bottecchia	+ 1' 41"
9	Marcel Russenberger (SUI)	Cilo–Aufina	+ 1' 54"
10	Silvano Contini (ITA)	Bianchi–Piaggio	+ 1' 58"
