= Positively False =

2007 autobiography by Floyd Landis

- Author: Floyd Landis, Loren Mooney
- Publication date: June 26, 2007
- ISBN: 9781416950233

Positively False is the autobiography by 2006 Tour de France champion Floyd Landis, published in June 2007

The book was written by Floyd Landis in association with Loren Mooney (the executive editor of Bicycling Magazine) and is put forward as the "Real story of how I (Landis) won the Tour De France".

The opening chapters outline Landis' upbringing in a Mennonite community in Farmersville, Pennsylvania. The Mennonites are similar to the Amish community, but embrace modern culture to a greater extent than the Amish. Landis tells us how his cycling initially caused some friction in his family but how his mother and father ended up supporting his ambitions to become a professional cyclist and eventually watched him win the Tour De France.

The book covers his early associations with various mountain biking teams and his transition into a world class road racer who eventually becomes Lance Armstrong's most dependable domestique on the US Postal cycling team helping Armstrong to win the 2002, 2003 and 2004 Tours.

Landis mentions his right hip problems throughout the book. In 2003 he broke his hip in a cycling accident and it never really recovered. Landis did however manage to cycle four tours (and win one in the process) on a right hip bone that was slowly disintegrating and rotting away. He put off surgery in order to win the 2006 TDF even though he could barely walk, but eventually succumbed to the knife in Sept 2006 and had the hip replaced. Landis states that his ultimate aim will be to form a Floyd Landis Foundation whose aim will be to inform people about Severe Avascular Necrosis, the condition which attacked his hip.

The relationship between Landis and Armstrong is explored in great detail, from the earliest days when it appears that Landis was in awe of Armstrong to the eventual break up of their relationship in 2004-05 when Landis displayed his own ambitions to become leader of a team. Landis writes that Armstrong was "The Boss" of the professional cycling peloton and crushed any sign of personal ambition in any of his team mates. There was no room for anyone with a bigger ego or bigger ideas than Armstrong and Landis, it appears, had both.

Landis led something of a revolt in the US Postal team by asking and exposing what each rider was earning, and when he did not consider he was being paid what he was worth Landis went looking elsewhere.

Landis describes how US Postal tried to undermine his negotiations with the Phonak cycling squad by suggesting that Landis had signed a new contract with them (which was untrue), however Landis ended up as team leader of Phonak after Tyler Hamilton tested positive for doping and went into the 2006 Tour de France as one of the favorites.

The 2006 Tour is not covered in huge detail until we get to the time of Landis' positive test after Stage 17. During Stage 16, while wearing the yellow jersey, Landis has a disastrous stage and loses time to second-placed rider Oscar Pereiro. Landis describes how he "has nothing to lose" and attacks from the start of Stage 17, eventually winning it by over 8 minutes and ultimately reclaiming the yellow jersey and the overall TDF title.

Unfortunately for Landis, the urine sample he provides after Stage 17 shows an abnormally high level of synthetic testosterone (not occurring naturally in the body), but he does not get to know about this until after the tour has finished. Landis goes into great detail of how wronged he feels and how devastated he, his wife Amber, and his team are. He is sacked by Phonak and has not raced on the road since.

The last few chapters describe his fight against the cycling authorities. The World Anti Doping Association (WADA) and its president Dick Pound come in for some particular criticism, with Landis describing them as Judge, Jury and Executioner and labeling Pound as "a liar" who attempted to smear Landis by allegedly releasing information to the media undermining Landis' case. Pound apparently came up with the nickname "Roid Floyd" for Landis, the Roid part obviously referring to steroids.

Landis states that the positive test was not "a positive" test at all, but was flawed and that his samples were mishandled by the French lab that carried out the tests. Landis describes how his defense team spent months going over the 370 page evidential packet from WADA and numbered many errors that the French lab appears to have made. He explains that he was seen by the USADA (United States anti doping agency) as "guilty until proven innocent" and warned by the UCI (world cycling federation) not to fight the case because he would lose and be bankrupted. Floyd does not attempt to explain why he tested positive because he can't, but strenuously denies doping.

The warning he receives proves to be prophetic as Landis explains that his defense has cost him over a million dollars and led to the formation of the Floyd Fairness Fund which aims to ensure that no one has to go through what Landis has had to because of what he claims is a flawed doping procedure. The book ends with Landis expressing hope of acquittal.

Landis was stripped of his TDF title in September 2007; in May 2010 he confessed to doping and accused Lance Armstrong of doing the same, contradicting the entire premise of the book.
