= 1983 Liège–Bastogne–Liège =

Race details
- Dates: 17 April 1983
- Stages: 1
- Distance: 244.7 km (152.0 mi)
- Winning time: 6h 44' 12"

Results
	Winner	Steven Rooks (NED)	(Sem–France Loire–Reydel–Mavic)
	Second	Giuseppe Saronni (ITA)	(Del Tongo–Colnago)
	Third	Pascal Jules (FRA)	(Renault–Elf)

The 1983 Liège–Bastogne–Liège was the 69th edition of the Liège–Bastogne–Liège cycle race and was held on 17 April 1983. The race started and finished in Liège. The race was won by Steven Rooks of the Sem–France Loire team.

== General classification ==
Final general classification

Rank	Rider	Team	Time
1	Steven Rooks (NED)	Sem–France Loire–Reydel–Mavic	6h 44' 12"
2	Giuseppe Saronni (ITA)	Del Tongo–Colnago	+ 10"
3	Pascal Jules (FRA)	Renault–Elf	+ 10"
4	Phil Anderson (AUS)	Peugeot–Shell–Michelin	+ 10"
5	Henk Lubberding (NED)	TI–Raleigh–Campagnolo	+ 10"
6	Hennie Kuiper (NED)	Jacky Aernoudt–Rossin–Campagnolo	+ 10"
7	Adri van der Poel (NED)	Jacky Aernoudt–Rossin–Campagnolo	+ 28"
8	Alfons De Wolf (BEL)	Bianchi–Piaggio	+ 28"
9	René Bittinger (FRA)	Sem–France Loire–Reydel–Mavic	+ 28"
10	Guido Van Calster (BEL)	Del Tongo–Colnago	+ 28"
