= Christiane Ayotte =

Canadian scientist

OC Christiane Ayotte
- Born: Quebec, Canada
- Education: Université de Montréal (MSc, 1978); Université de Montréal (PhD, 1983); Institut national de la recherche scientifique (Doctorate#Post)
- Known for: Doping control
- Scientific career
- Fields: Organic chemistry
- Workplaces: Institut national de la recherche scientifique

Christiane Ayotte, O.C., is a Canadian scientist and academic from Quebec. She is currently the director of the Armand-Frappier Santé Biotechnologie Research Centre was formerly the President of the World Association of Anti-Doping Scientists from 2016–2018.

== Education ==
Ayotte received a MSc and PhD in organic chemistry from the Université de Montréal. Ayotte then pursued two years of post-doctoral studies in mass spectrometry at the Institut national de la recherche scientifique (INRS).

She next became a research associate at the Doping Control Laboratory of the INRS. Since 1991, she has been director of the Doping Control Laboratory, the only Canadian laboratory accredited by the World Anti-Doping Agency, and has been a research associate professor at INRS since 1992. Since 1995, she has been a member of the doping commission of the International Association of Athletics Federations and, since 1996, a member of the Working Group on Harmonization of Laboratory protocols of the International Olympic Committee.

== Career ==
Ayotte was named scientist of the year by Radio Canada in 1999. In 2006, she received the Canadian Medical Association's Medal of Honour. In 2018, she was named an officer in the Order of Canada. She was also awarded a medal by the Quebec Ministry of International Relations and La Francophonie in 2018.

== In media ==
In the 2017 documentary film Icarus, Ayotte can be seen berating whistleblower Grigory Rodchenkov after he came forward with allegations and details about the Russian doping program.
