= 1983 Giro di Lombardia =

Race details
- Dates: 15 October 1983
- Stages: 1
- Distance: 253 km (157.2 mi)
- Winning time: 6h 27' 36"

Results
	Winner	Sean Kelly (IRL)	(Sem–France Loire–Reydel–Mavic)
	Second	Greg LeMond (USA)	(Renault–Elf)
	Third	Adri van der Poel (NED)	(Jacky Aernoudt–Rossin–Campagnolo)

The 1983 Giro di Lombardia was the 77th edition of the Giro di Lombardia cycle race and was held on 15 October 1983. The race started in Brescia and finished in Como. The race was won by Sean Kelly of the Sem–France Loire team.

== General classification ==
Final general classification

Rank	Rider	Team	Time
1	Sean Kelly (IRL)	Sem–France Loire–Reydel–Mavic	6h 27' 36"
2	Greg LeMond (USA)	Renault–Elf	+ 0"
3	Adri van der Poel (NED)	Jacky Aernoudt–Rossin–Campagnolo	+ 0"
4	Hennie Kuiper (NED)	Jacky Aernoudt–Rossin–Campagnolo	+ 0"
5	Francesco Moser (ITA)	Gis Gelati	+ 0"
6	Gilbert Glaus (SUI)	Cilo–Aufina	+ 0"
7	Antonio Ferretti (SUI)	Cilo–Aufina	+ 0"
8	Phil Anderson (AUS)	Peugeot–Shell–Michelin	+ 0"
9	Silvano Contini (ITA)	Bianchi–Piaggio	+ 0"
10	Alfredo Chinetti (ITA)	Inoxpran	+ 0"
