= 1983 UCI Road World Championships – Men's road race =

Men's Individual Road Race
1983 UCI Road World Championships
- Rainbow jersey

Race details
- Dates: 4 September 1983
- Stages: 1
- Distance: 269.89 km (167.7 mi)
- Winning time: 7h 01' 21"

Results
	Winner	Greg LeMond (USA)	(United States)
	Second	Adri van der Poel (NED)	(Netherlands)
	Third	Stephen Roche (IRL)	(Ireland)

The men's road race at the 1983 UCI Road World Championships was the 50th edition of the event. The race took place on Sunday 4 September 1983 in Altenrhein, Switzerland, over a distance of 269.89 km (167.7 mi). The race was won by Greg LeMond of the United States.

117 riders started, there were 46 classified finishers, and the winner's average speed was 38.31 km/h (23.80 mph).

== Final classification ==
General classification (1–10)

Rank	Rider	Time
1st place, gold medalist(s)	Greg LeMond (USA)	7h 01' 21"
2nd place, silver medalist(s)	Adri van der Poel (NED)	+ 1' 11"
3rd place, bronze medalist(s)	Stephen Roche (IRL)	+ 1' 11"
4	Faustino Rupérez (ESP)	+ 1' 11"
5	Claude Criquielion (BEL)	+ 1' 11"
6	Erich Maechler (SUI)	+ 1' 33"
7	Jean-Luc Vandenbroucke (BEL)	+ 1' 33"
8	Sean Kelly (IRL)	+ 1' 36"
9	Phil Anderson (AUS)	+ 1' 36"
10	Stefan Mutter (SUI)	+ 1' 36"
