= 1983 Milan–San Remo =

Race details
- Dates: 19 March 1983
- Stages: 1
- Distance: 294 km (183 mi)
- Winning time: 7h 07' 59"

Results
	Winner	Giuseppe Saronni (ITA)	(Del Tongo–Colnago)
	Second	Guido Bontempi (ITA)	(Inoxpran)
	Third	Jan Raas (NED)	(TI–Raleigh–Campagnolo)

The 1983 Milan–San Remo was the 74th edition of the Milan–San Remo cycle race and was held on 19 March 1983. The race started in Milan and finished in San Remo. The race was won by Giuseppe Saronni of the Del Tongo team.

== General classification ==
Final general classification

Rank	Rider	Team	Time
1	Giuseppe Saronni (ITA)	Del Tongo–Colnago	7h 07' 59"
2	Guido Bontempi (ITA)	Inoxpran	+ 44"
3	Jan Raas (NED)	TI–Raleigh–Campagnolo	+ 44"
4	Eric Vanderaerden (BEL)	Jacky Aernoudt–Rossin–Campagnolo	+ 44"
5	Sean Kelly (IRL)	Sem–France Loire–Reydel–Mavic	+ 44"
6	Juan Fernández (ESP)	Zor–Gemeaz Cusin	+ 44"
7	Franco Chioccioli (ITA)	Vivi–Benotto–Puma	+ 44"
8	Noël Dejonckheere (BEL)	Teka	+ 44"
9	René Bittinger (FRA)	Sem–France Loire–Reydel–Mavic	+ 44"
10	Gabriele Landoni (ITA)	Vivi–Benotto–Puma	+ 44"
