= 1986 UCI Road World Championships =

- Venue: Colorado Springs, Colorado, United States
- Date: 6 September 1986
- Coordinates: 38°50′2″N 104°49′31″W
- Events: 4

The 1986 UCI Road World Championships took place on 6 September 1986 in Colorado Springs, United States.

In the same period, the 1986 UCI Track Cycling World Championships were also organized in Colorado Springs.

== Results ==
Race:	Gold:	Time	Silver:	Time	Bronze :	Time
Men
Men's road race	Moreno Argentin; Italy	6.32'38"	Charly Mottet; France	+ 1"	Giuseppe Saronni; Italy	+ 9"
Amateurs' road race	Uwe Ampler; East Germany	4.14'48"	John Talen; Netherlands	-	Arjan Jagt; Netherlands	-
Team time trial	Netherlands; Tom Cordes; Gerrit de Vries; John Talen; Rob Harmeling	2.00'10"	Italy; Eros Poli; Massimo Podenzana; Mario Scirea; Flavio Vanzella	2.01'48"	East Germany; Uwe Ampler; Uwe Raab; Mario Kummer; Dan Radtke	2.02'47"
Women
Women's road race	Jeannie Longo; France	1.38'56"	Janelle Parks; United States	-	Alla Jakovleva; Soviet Union	-

== Medal table ==
Rank	Nation	Gold	Silver	Bronze	Total
1	Italy (ITA)	1	1	1	3
1	Netherlands (NED)	1	1	1	3
3	France (FRA)	1	1	0	2
4	East Germany (DDR)	1	0	1	2
5	United States (USA)	0	1	0	1
6	Soviet Union (URS)	0	0	1	1
Totals (6 entries)		4	4	4	12
