= 2008 Tour de France, Stage 1 to Stage 11 =

Cycling race stages

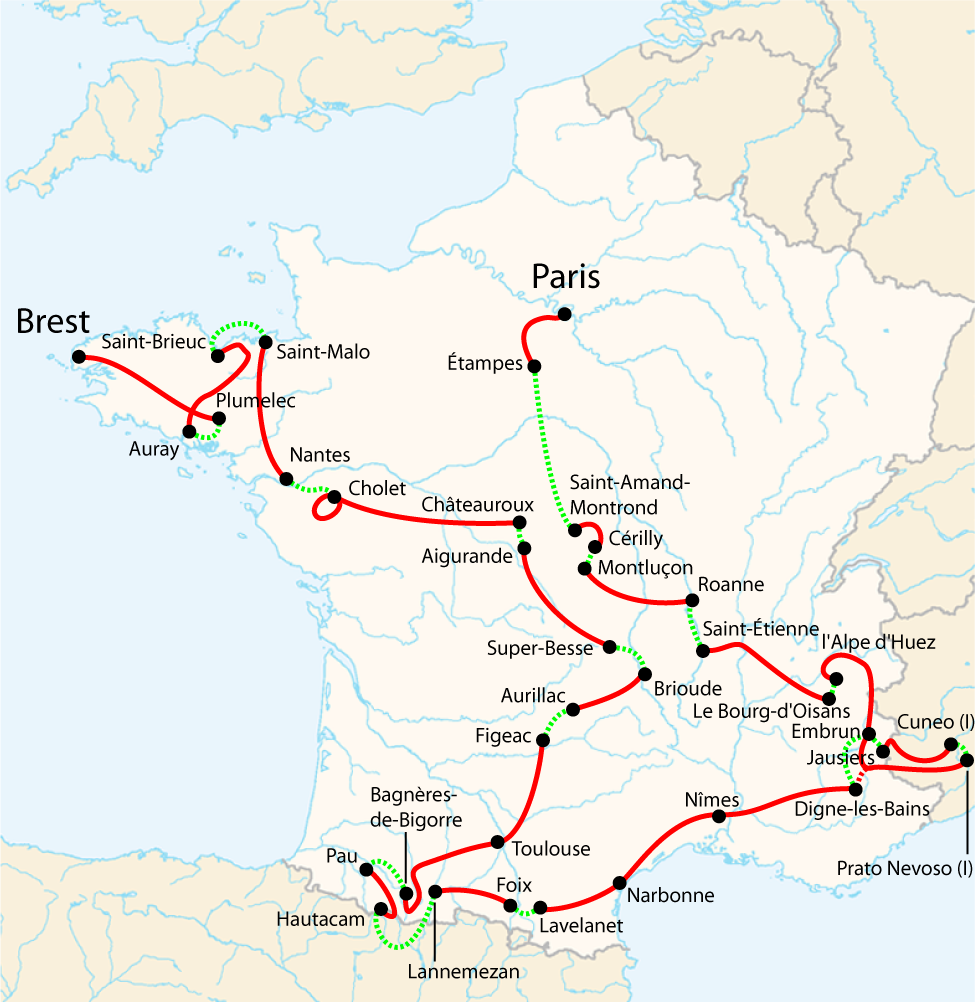
Stages in 2008

These are the profiles for the individual stages in the 2008 Tour de France, with Stage 1 on 5 July, and Stage 11 on 16 July.

== Stages ==
=== Stage 1 ===
5 July 2008 — Brest to Plumelec, 197.5 km

Stage 1 profile

For the first time since 1967, the tour started with a road stage rather than the traditional prologue. The stage was hilly with four fourth category climbs through the Monts d'Arrée in the department of Finistère. The finish at Plumelec is uphill on the Côte de Cadoual, with a 1.7 km climb at 6.2%. As there were no time bonuses in the three intermediate sprints, the first rider home wore the yellow jersey at the start of stage 2.

An eight-man breakaway formed at the 3 km mark, and it got away for some time. At the first feeding station, Hervé Duclos-Lassalle crashed and sustained a broken left wrist, becoming the first rider to have to abandon the 2008 Tour. At about the 30 km to go mark, two in the break, Lilian Jégou and David de la Fuente got away from the other six after a short series of attacks and counter-attacks. The peloton, paced by Silence–Lotto, increased pace when the other six rejoined them, and Jegou and de la Fuente were caught at around the 7 km to go mark. At that point, the peloton split into several groups for the run in toward the finish, won by Alejandro Valverde. One of the pre-race favourites, Mauricio Soler, fell with 20 km remaining and lost more than three minutes.

Stage 1 result and general classification after stage 1

Rank	Rider	Team	Time
1	Alejandro Valverde (ESP)	Caisse d'Epargne	4h 36' 07"
2	Philippe Gilbert (BEL)	Française des Jeux	+ 1"
3	Jérôme Pineau (FRA)	Bouygues Télécom	+ 1"
4	Kim Kirchen (LUX)	Team Columbia	+ 1"
DSQ	~~Riccardo Riccò (ITA)~~	~~Saunier Duval–Scott~~	~~+ 1"~~
6	Cadel Evans (AUS)	Silence–Lotto	+ 1"
7	Fränk Schleck (LUX)	CSC–Saxo Bank	+ 1"
8	Filippo Pozzato (ITA)	Liquigas	+ 1"
9	Óscar Freire (ESP)	Rabobank	+ 1"
10	Óscar Pereiro (ESP)	Caisse d'Epargne	+ 1"

=== Stage 2 ===
6 July 2008 — Auray to Saint-Brieuc, 164.5 km

Stage 2 profile

The second stage was another hilly stage, with three fourth category climbs and the third category "wall" at Mûr-de-Bretagne.

Sylvain Chavanel and Thomas Voeckler established a breakaway at the first categorized climb, reaching a maximum advantage of 6'25'' before being joined by Agritubel teammates Christophe Moreau and David Lelay with 57 km remaining. The four Frenchmen were caught by the peloton in the final 2 km, and the sprint was won by Thor Hushovd.

Stage 2 result

Rank	Rider	Team	Time
1	Thor Hushovd (NOR)	Crédit Agricole	3h 45' 13"
2	Kim Kirchen (LUX)	Team Columbia	s.t.
3	Gerald Ciolek (GER)	Team Columbia	s.t.
4	Robert Hunter (RSA)	Barloworld	s.t.
5	Erik Zabel (GER)	Team Milram	s.t.
6	Yuri Trofimov (RUS)	Bouygues Télécom	s.t.
7	Óscar Freire (ESP)	Rabobank	s.t.
8	Jimmy Casper (FRA)	Agritubel	s.t.
9	Martin Elmiger (SUI)	Ag2r–La Mondiale	s.t.
10	Leonardo Duque (COL)	Cofidis	s.t.

General classification after stage 2

Rank	Rider	Team	Time
1	Alejandro Valverde (ESP)	Caisse d'Epargne	8h 21' 20"
2	Kim Kirchen (LUX)	Team Columbia	+ 1"
3	Óscar Freire (ESP)	Rabobank	+ 1"
4	Juan José Cobo (ESP)	Saunier Duval–Scott	+ 1"
5	Cadel Evans (AUS)	Silence–Lotto	+ 1"
6	Jérôme Pineau (FRA)	Bouygues Télécom	+ 1"
7	David Millar (GBR)	Garmin–Chipotle p/b H30	+ 1"
DSQ	~~Riccardo Riccò (ITA)~~	~~Saunier Duval–Scott~~	+ 1"
9	Fränk Schleck (LUX)	CSC–Saxo Bank	+ 1"
10	Filippo Pozzato (ITA)	Liquigas	+ 1"

=== Stage 3 ===
7 July 2008 — Saint-Malo to Nantes, 208 km

Stage 3 profile

Stage 3 was flat, with no ranking climbs, which was expected to favour the sprinters at the finish alongside the River Loire in Nantes.

A four-man breakaway formed at the 9 km mark, comprising William Frischkorn, Samuel Dumoulin, Paolo Longo Borghini, and Romain Feillu. They quickly took the three intermediate sprints available on the course and had a maximum advantage of 14 minutes before the peloton began to reel them in. Several teams helped with the workload to bring the breakaway back. With the day's early rain saturating the road, Fabian Wegmann crashed around 60 km in, needing to change his bike minutes later.

For many kilometers, the time gap didn't decrease beyond about 6'30" to 6'45", leading to speculation that the four in the breakaway could survive to the line. The teams of the prominent sprinters came forward to make a faster pace at around 35 km to go. With about 23 km to go, Ángel Gómez and Nicki Sørensen were involved in a crash that split the peloton into three fragments, the second of which contained the white jersey Riccardo Riccò and Denis Menchov, finished 38 seconds behind the first, which contained the yellow jersey Alejandro Valverde. The third group contained Christophe Moreau. Gómez eventually had to abandon the Tour.

The breakaway survived to the finish, giving the Tour a new maillot jaune for the next day's individual time trial. Dumoulin won the sprint to the line.

Stage 3 result

Rank	Rider	Team	Time
1	Samuel Dumoulin (FRA)	Cofidis	5h 05' 27"
2	William Frischkorn (USA)	Garmin–Chipotle p/b H30	s.t.
3	Romain Feillu (FRA)	Agritubel	s.t.
4	Paolo Longo Borghini (ITA)	Barloworld	+ 14"
5	Robbie McEwen (AUS)	Silence–Lotto	+ 2' 03"
6	Erik Zabel (GER)	Team Milram	+ 2' 03"
7	Óscar Freire (ESP)	Rabobank	+ 2' 03"
8	Thor Hushovd (NOR)	Crédit Agricole	+ 2' 03"
9	Robert Förster (GER)	Gerolsteiner	+ 2' 03"
10	Mark Cavendish (GBR)	Team Columbia	+ 2' 03"

General classification after stage 3

Rank	Rider	Team	Time
1	(France) Romain Feillu	Agritubel	13h 27' 05"
2	Paolo Longo Borghini (ITA)	Barloworld	+ 35"
3	William Frischkorn (USA)	Garmin–Chipotle p/b H30	+ 1' 42"
4	Alejandro Valverde (ESP)	Caisse d'Epargne	+ 1' 45"
5	Kim Kirchen (LUX)	Team Columbia	+ 1' 46"
6	Óscar Freire (ESP)	Rabobank	+ 1' 46"
7	Jérôme Pineau (FRA)	Bouygues Télécom	+ 1' 46"
8	David Millar (GBR)	Garmin–Chipotle p/b H30	+ 1' 46"
9	Cadel Evans (AUS)	Silence–Lotto	+ 1' 46"
10	Filippo Pozzato (ITA)	Liquigas	+ 1' 46"

=== Stage 4 ===
8 July 2008 — Cholet, 29.5 km (ITT)

Stage 4 profile

The fourth stage was an individual time trial over a flat course to the west of Cholet in the department of Maine-et-Loire.

Denis Menchov and Jens Voigt set nearly identical times about two-thirds of the way into the time trial, with Menchov one second better. It stood as best until reigning world time trial champion and stage favorite Fabian Cancellara gained a one-second advantage, despite having been behind Menchov's and Voigt's pace at both intermediate time checks. The surprise of the day came when Stefan Schumacher beat Cancellara by 33 seconds, having similar leads at each time check. Cadel Evans, David Millar, and Kim Kirchen also beat Cancellara, but could not match Schumacher.

As was expected, the top three men in the GC, having been in a breakaway almost the entire previous day, fell in the overall standings after the time trial, and the Tour had its third different rider in yellow at the day's end.

Stage 4 result

Rank	Rider	Team	Time
DSQ	~~Stefan Schumacher (GER)~~	~~Gerolsteiner~~	~~35' 44"~~
1	Kim Kirchen (LUX)	Team Columbia	36' 02"
2	David Millar (GBR)	Garmin–Chipotle p/b H30	s.t.
3	Cadel Evans (AUS)	Silence–Lotto	+ 5"
4	Fabian Cancellara (SUI)	CSC–Saxo Bank	+ 15"
5	Denis Menchov (RUS)	Rabobank	+ 16"
6	Jens Voigt (GER)	CSC–Saxo Bank	+ 17"
7	Christian Vande Velde (USA)	Garmin–Chipotle p/b H30	+ 19"
8	George Hincapie (USA)	Team Columbia	+ 23"
9	Vincenzo Nibali (ITA)	Liquigas	+ 29"

General classification after stage 4

Rank	Rider	Team	Time
DSQ	~~Stefan Schumacher (GER)~~	~~Gerolsteiner~~	~~14h 04' 41"~~
1	Kim Kirchen (LUX)	Team Columbia	14h 04' 53"
2	David Millar (GBR)	Garmin–Chipotle p/b H30	s.t.
3	Cadel Evans (AUS)	Silence–Lotto	+ 9"
4	Fabian Cancellara (SUI)	CSC–Saxo Bank	+ 21"
5	Christian Vande Velde (USA)	Garmin–Chipotle p/b H30	+ 25"
6	George Hincapie (USA)	Team Columbia	+ 29"
7	Thomas Lövkvist (SWE)	Team Columbia	+ 35"
8	Vincenzo Nibali (ITA)	Liquigas	+ 46"
9	Iván Gutiérrez (ESP)	Caisse d'Epargne	+ 49"

=== Stage 5 ===
9 July 2008 — Cholet to Châteauroux, 232 km

Stage 5 profile

This was the longest stage of the 2008 tour, over flat roads in the departments of Maine-et-Loire, Deux-Sèvres, Vienne, Indre-et-Loire and Indre.

Mauricio Soler fell in the neutral zone before the start; already suffering injuries from a fall on the opening day, the Colombian who won the polka-dot jersey last year finally succumbed and retired from the race at the 11 km mark of stage five.

The stage was led almost from start to finish by three breakaway riders. The French trio of Lilian Jégou, Florent Brard and national champion Nicolas Vogondy opened up a gap of more than eight minutes, which was slowly whittled away by the chasing peloton. Vogondy broke away from his compatriots in the final 1.5 km, only to be overhauled by the sprinters around 30 metres from the line.

Mark Cavendish, who was led out by his German team-mate Gerald Ciolek, held off late attacks from Thor Hushovd, Óscar Freire and Erik Zabel, and pulled away from his rivals in the final metres to claim glory after almost five-and-a-half hours in the saddle. This was his first of a record–35 stage wins for Cavendish in the Tour de France.

Stage 5 result

Rank	Rider	Team	Time
1	Mark Cavendish (GBR)	Team Columbia	5h 27' 52"
2	Óscar Freire (ESP)	Rabobank	s.t.
3	Erik Zabel (GER)	Team Milram	s.t.
4	Thor Hushovd (NOR)	Crédit Agricole	s.t.
5	Baden Cooke (AUS)	Barloworld	s.t.
6	Robert Hunter (RSA)	Barloworld	s.t.
7	Leonardo Duque (COL)	Cofidis	s.t.
8	Robbie McEwen (AUS)	Silence–Lotto	s.t.
9	Francesco Chicchi (ITA)	Liquigas	s.t.
10	Julian Dean (NZL)	Garmin–Chipotle p/b H30	s.t.

General classification after stage 5

Rank	Rider	Team	Time
DSQ	~~(Germany) Stefan Schumacher~~	~~Gerolsteiner~~	~~19h 32' 33"~~
1	Kim Kirchen (LUX)	Team Columbia	19h 32' 45"
2	David Millar (GBR)	Garmin–Chipotle p/b H30	s.t.
3	Cadel Evans (AUS)	Silence–Lotto	+ 9"
4	Fabian Cancellara (SUI)	CSC–Saxo Bank	+ 21"
5	Christian Vande Velde (USA)	Garmin–Chipotle p/b H30	+ 25"
6	George Hincapie (USA)	Team Columbia	+ 29"
7	(Sweden) Thomas Lövkvist	Team Columbia	+ 35"
8	Vincenzo Nibali (ITA)	Liquigas	+ 46"
9	Iván Gutiérrez (ESP)	Caisse d'Epargne	+ 49"

=== Stage 6 ===
10 July 2008 — Aigurande to Super-Besse Sancy, 195.5 km

Stage 6 profile

This was the first mountain stage of the tour through the Massif Central, with two Fourth Category climbs in the first half of the race before the riders crossed the Second Category Col de la Croix-Morand after 158 km. The finish is at the ski station of Super Besse on the slopes of Puy de Sancy with a climb of 11 km at an average gradient of 4.7%, including the final 1.5 km with a maximum gradient of 10%.

A three-man breakaway, made up of Frenchmen Sylvain Chavanel, Benoît Vaugrenard and Freddy Bichot, claimed the sprints and the two small category 4 climbs early on in the stage. The group attained a maximum lead of 5'15'' after 95 km. The main field split on the climb of the Col de la Croix-Morand, with many of the sprinters and leadout men fell back into an autobus, and many short-lived attempts to catch the two remaining riders from the breakaway, Vaugrenard having been dropped.

Chavanel and Bichot survived to the top of the Col de la Croix-Morand, giving Chavanel sufficient points on the day's climbs to gain the lead in the King of the Mountains classification, but he was caught with 20m remaining, and Bichot 7 km later. The autobus rejoined the second peloton on the descent from the Col de la Croix-Morand, before the field split into several small groups again. Riders who posed no threat to the GC attacked on the way up to Super-Besse, and the yellow jersey group, still being paced by Caisse d'Epargne, let them all go. Even when Christian Vande Velde, sixth overall and a member of the first place team Garmin–Chipotle, launched an attack, Caisse d'Epargne did not respond.

Finally, at the 1 kilometer to go mark, the peloton came forward to bring back those who had broken away. Virtually all of the GC contenders were at the front of the main group. The last of Valverde's teammates peeled off to open the sprint to the line, won by Riccardo Riccò. In seeking a position for the final sprint, the yellow jersey wearer Stefan Schumacher caught the wheel of Kim Kirchen with 300m remaining, and fell. Since the finish was on an uphill climb, the rule giving anyone who crashes in the final 3 kilometers the same time as the group they were in upon crashing was not invoked, and he lost 32'' on the stage, and Kirchen took the overall lead.

Stage 6 result

Rank	Rider	Team	Time
DSQ	~~Riccardo Riccò (ITA)~~	~~Saunier Duval–Scott~~	~~4h 57' 52"~~
1	Alejandro Valverde (ESP)	Caisse d'Epargne	4h 57' 53"
2	Cadel Evans (AUS)	Silence–Lotto	s.t.
3	Fränk Schleck (LUX)	CSC–Saxo Bank	+ 3"
4	Kim Kirchen (LUX)	Team Columbia	+ 3"
5	Roman Kreuziger (CZE)	Liquigas	+ 6"
6	Moisés Dueñas (ESP)	Barloworld	+ 6"
7	Carlos Sastre (ESP)	CSC–Saxo Bank	+ 6"
8	Denis Menchov (RUS)	Rabobank	+ 6"
DSQ	~~Leonardo Piepoli (ITA)~~	~~Saunier Duval–Scott~~	~~+ 6"~~

General classification after stage 6

Rank	Rider	Team	Time
1	Kim Kirchen (LUX)	Team Columbia	24h 30' 41"
2	Cadel Evans (AUS)	Silence–Lotto	+ 6"
DSQ	~~Stefan Schumacher (GER)~~	~~Gerolsteiner~~	~~+ 16"~~
4	Christian Vande Velde (USA)	Garmin–Chipotle p/b H30	+ 44"
5	David Millar (GBR)	Garmin–Chipotle p/b H30	+ 47"
6	Thomas Lövkvist (SWE)	Team Columbia	+ 54"
7	Denis Menchov (RUS)	Rabobank	+ 1' 03"
8	Alejandro Valverde (ESP)	Caisse d'Epargne	+ 1' 12"
9	Stijn Devolder (BEL)	Quick-Step	+ 1' 21"
10	Óscar Pereiro (ESP)	Caisse d'Epargne	+ 1' 21"

=== Stage 7 ===
11 July 2008 — Brioude to Aurillac, 159 km

Stage 7 profile

This is a short stage along the steep roads of the Massif Central, through the Monts du Cantal with the third category Côte de Fraisse coming after only 11 km. After a fourth category climb came a pair of Category Two climbs: the Col d'Entremont after 101 km, and the Pas de Peyrol, before descending to Aurillac via another fourth category climb.

Early crosswinds split the peloton. Damiano Cunego crashed after about 50 km and although he rejoined the leading group, he missed a later break, losing 33 seconds on the day. A breakaway made up of Josep Jufré, Luis León Sánchez, David de la Fuente and Vincenzo Nibali formed on the way up the Col d'Entremont and were caught by a group of nineteen, including most of the overall favourites, with about 9 km remaining, but Sánchez counterattacked on the descent and held on to win the stage.

De la Fuente's three leads over the tops of climbs earned him the lead in the King of the Mountains classification, while four riders, including Agritubel team leader Christophe Moreau failed to finish and Magnus Bäckstedt finished outside regulation time.

Liquigas rider Manuel Beltrán was revealed after this stage to have failed a blood doping test earlier in the tour, and was withdrawn by his team.

Stage 7 result

Rank	Rider	Team	Time
1	Luis León Sánchez (ESP)	Caisse d'Epargne	3h 52' 53"
DSQ	~~Stefan Schumacher (GER)~~	~~Gerolsteiner~~	~~+ 6"~~
3	Filippo Pozzato (ITA)	Liquigas	+ 6"
4	Kim Kirchen (LUX)	Team Columbia	+ 6"
5	Alejandro Valverde (ESP)	Caisse d'Epargne	+ 6"
6	Óscar Pereiro (ESP)	Caisse d'Epargne	+ 6"
7	Samuel Sánchez (ESP)	Euskaltel–Euskadi	+ 6"
8	Josep Jufré (ESP)	Saunier Duval–Scott	+ 6"
9	Christian Vande Velde (USA)	Garmin–Chipotle p/b H30	+ 6"
10	Andy Schleck (LUX)	CSC–Saxo Bank	+ 6"

General classification after stage 7

Rank	Rider	Team	Time
1	Kim Kirchen (LUX)	Team Columbia	28h 23' 40"
2	Cadel Evans (AUS)	Silence–Lotto	+ 6"
DSQ	~~Stefan Schumacher (GER)~~	~~Gerolsteiner~~	~~+ 16"~~
4	Christian Vande Velde (USA)	Garmin–Chipotle p/b H30	+ 44"
5	Denis Menchov (RUS)	Rabobank	+ 1' 03"
6	Alejandro Valverde (ESP)	Caisse d'Epargne	+ 1' 12"
7	David Millar (GBR)	Garmin–Chipotle p/b H30	+ 1' 14"
8	Stijn Devolder (BEL)	Quick-Step	+ 1' 21"
9	Óscar Pereiro (ESP)	Caisse d'Epargne	+ 1' 21"
10	Thomas Lövkvist (SWE)	Team Columbia	+ 1' 21"

=== Stage 8 ===
12 July 2008 — Figeac to Toulouse, 172.5 km

Stage 8 profile

This was a connecting stage from the Massif Central to the Pyrenees and had four categorized climbs in the first half of the race before the finish in Toulouse.

The significant break of the day saw Laurent Lefèvre go clear on the second climb, and was followed by his Bouygues Télécom teammate Jérôme Pineau, Amets Txurruka, and Christophe Riblon. Eventually Lefevre allowed the other three to join him, and the group attained a maximum advantage of 5' 15'' at 110 km, but pressure from sprinters' teams reduced the gap rapidly over the following 20 km, to less than three minutes. Riccardo Riccò was one of four fallers at 116 km, and after being assisted to catch up with the peloton, needed medical attention. With 13 km to go, Pineau and Txurruka moved clear of their colleagues in the break, who were absorbed into the peloton 3 km later. The pursuit of the peloton, which had eased up to avoid regrouping too soon and allow other attacks, put on pressure again in the last 20 km, finally catching the two escapees with 3.5 km left. In a bunched sprint, Mark Cavendish gained his second stage victory.

Stage 8 result

Rank	Rider	Team	Time
1	Mark Cavendish (GBR)	Team Columbia	4h 02' 54"
2	Gerald Ciolek (GER)	Team Columbia	s.t.
3	Jimmy Casper (FRA)	Agritubel	s.t.
4	Óscar Freire (ESP)	Rabobank	s.t.
5	Robert Förster (GER)	Gerolsteiner	s.t.
6	Erik Zabel (GER)	Team Milram	s.t.
7	Gert Steegmans (BEL)	Quick-Step	s.t.
8	Sébastien Chavanel (FRA)	Française des Jeux	s.t.
9	Thor Hushovd (NOR)	Crédit Agricole	s.t.
10	Robert Hunter (RSA)	Barloworld	s.t.

General classification after stage 8

Rank	Rider	Team	Time
1	Kim Kirchen (LUX)	Team Columbia	32h 26' 34"
2	Cadel Evans (AUS)	Silence–Lotto	+ 6"
DSQ	~~Stefan Schumacher (GER)~~	~~Gerolsteiner~~	~~+ 16"~~
4	Christian Vande Velde (USA)	Garmin–Chipotle p/b H30	+ 44"
5	Denis Menchov (RUS)	Rabobank	+ 1' 03"
6	Alejandro Valverde (ESP)	Caisse d'Epargne	+ 1' 12"
7	David Millar (GBR)	Garmin–Chipotle p/b H30	+ 1' 14"
8	Stijn Devolder (BEL)	Quick-Step	+ 1' 21"
9	Óscar Pereiro (ESP)	Caisse d'Epargne	+ 1' 21"
10	Thomas Lövkvist (SWE)	Team Columbia	+ 1' 21"

=== Stage 9 ===
13 July 2008 — Toulouse to Bagnères-de-Bigorre, 224 km

Stage 9 profile

This stage took the riders into the Pyrenees with a series of fourth category climbs in the early stages before the third category Col des Ares at the 100 km mark. After passing through Bagnères-de-Luchon, the riders climbed the First Category Col de Peyresourde before the final climb over the Col d'Aspin, after which came a 26 km descent to the finish at Bagnères-de-Bigorre.

Aleksandr Kuschynski, Nicolas Jalabert, and Sebastian Lang formed a breakaway after 22 km that claimed the intermediate sprint and first few small climbs. They attained a maximum advantage of 14' 20'' at 55 km before the peloton, being paced by Euskaltel–Euskadi, started bringing them back. Cadel Evans crashed after about 105 km, injuring his left elbow and needing to ride with torn clothing the rest of the stage. He had to change bikes and was paced back into the peloton by the rest of his Silence–Lotto team. He, and subsequently Alejandro Valverde, needed to seek medical attention.

The leaders' advantage, after staying at around ten minutes for many kilometers, began to fall on the ascent of the Col de Peyresourde, and first Jalabert, then Kuschynski, dropped off Lang's pace. Maxime Monfort and King of the Mountains leader David de la Fuente moved ahead of the peloton before the first major mountain pass of the tour.

After consolidating on the descent from the Peyresourde, the peloton thinned and split again on the way up the Col d'Aspin. The main GC contenders came to the front of the peloton as it neared the summit, and only Lang of the early escapees remained clear. After several other riders attempted unsuccessfully to do so, Luis León Sánchez bridged the gap to Monfort and de la Fuente, only for the latter to drop away. The decisive attack of the stage came from Riccardo Riccò, who rapidly passed the four riders ahead of the peloton and crossed the top of the Col d'Aspin 1' 15'' ahead of the yellow jersey group he had left 4 km earlier.

Riccò preserved that margin on the descent to win the stage, with only Vladimir Efimkin moving clear of the peloton on the descent, to claim second position on the road.

Stage 9 result

Rank	Rider	Team	Time
DSQ	~~Riccardo Riccò (ITA)~~	~~Saunier Duval–Scott~~	~~5h 39' 28"~~
1	Vladimir Efimkin (RUS)	Ag2r–La Mondiale	5h 40' 32"
2	Cyril Dessel (FRA)	Ag2r–La Mondiale	+ 13"
3	Dmitriy Fofonov (KAZ)	Crédit Agricole	+ 13"
4	Christian Knees (GER)	Team Milram	+ 13"
5	Maxime Monfort (BEL)	Cofidis	+ 13"
6	Alejandro Valverde (ESP)	Caisse d'Epargne	+ 13"
7	Roman Kreuziger (CZE)	Liquigas	+ 13"
8	Damiano Cunego (ITA)	Lampre	+ 13"
9	Yaroslav Popovych (UKR)	Silence–Lotto	+ 13"

General classification after stage 9

Rank	Rider	Team	Time
1	Kim Kirchen (LUX)	Team Columbia	38h 07' 19"
2	Cadel Evans (AUS)	Silence–Lotto	+ 6"
3	Christian Vande Velde (USA)	Garmin–Chipotle p/b H30	+ 44"
DSQ	~~Stefan Schumacher (GER)~~	~~Gerolsteiner~~	~~+ 56"~~
5	Denis Menchov (RUS)	Rabobank	+ 1' 03"
6	Alejandro Valverde (ESP)	Caisse d'Epargne	+ 1' 12"
7	Stijn Devolder (BEL)	Quick-Step	+ 1' 21"
8	Óscar Pereiro (ESP)	Caisse d'Epargne	+ 1' 21"
9	Samuel Sánchez (ESP)	Euskaltel–Euskadi	+ 1' 27"
10	Carlos Sastre (ESP)	CSC–Saxo Bank	+ 1' 34"

=== Stage 10 ===
14 July 2008 — Pau to Hautacam, 156 km

Stage 10 profile

This stage was selected for the 2008 L'Étape du Tour run on Sunday 6 July when nearly 7,500 amateur and club cyclists raced over the route, with Laurent Four coming home in the fastest time of 5 hours 38 minutes.

The highlight of this short, intense stage is the Hors catégorie climb over the Col du Tourmalet at 2115 m, with the finish at the ski-station at Hautacam. The final climb is 14.4 km, with an average gradient of 7.2%, with the steepest section at 10%.

Twenty-four riders representing seventeen teams broke away from the peloton almost immediately. Included in the group were three riders each for Gerolsteiner and Bouygues Télécom as well as the green and polka-dot jersey wearers Óscar Freire and David de la Fuente. Only Milram, Lampre, and Garmin–Chipotle were unrepresented. Freire took the first intermediate sprint and with it the outright lead in the points classification.

Seven of the twenty-four came clear on the way up the Côte de Loucrup. Freire was among them and took the second sprint to cement his lead. The leaders' time gap grew to over nine minutes before the peloton thinned as chases came forward to bring them back. Rémy Di Gregorio attacked and got free of the group of seven, going it alone to be the first over the Tourmalet.

Jens Voigt and Team CSC Saxo Bank set a blistering pace up the Tourmalet in the peloton, with the intention of knocking off as many teammates of the overall contenders as they could while protecting Carlos Sastre. Several team leaders, including Alejandro Valverde, eventually dropped as well. Di Gregorio at last was caught by the yellow jersey's group of contenders at the 12 kilometers to go mark. The contenders traded attacks on the way up to Hautacam, and the yellow jersey himself Kim Kirchen was dropped along the way. Fränk Schleck, Juan José Cobo, and Leonardo Piepoli came forward and gained a maximum advantage of two minutes on the other contenders. The Saunier Duval riders went on to drop Schleck, and the time gap between Schleck and Cadel Evans was very close to see who would wear yellow at the day's end.

Stage 10 result

Rank	Rider	Team	Time
DSQ	~~Leonardo Piepoli (ITA)~~	~~Saunier Duval–Scott~~	~~4h 19' 27"~~
1	Juan José Cobo (ESP)	Saunier Duval–Scott	4h 19' 27"
2	Fränk Schleck (LUX)	CSC–Saxo Bank	+ 28"
DSQ	~~Bernhard Kohl (AUT)~~	~~Gerolsteiner~~	~~+ 1' 06"~~
4	Vladimir Efimkin (RUS)	Ag2r–La Mondiale	+ 2' 05"
DSQ	~~Riccardo Riccò (ITA)~~	~~Saunier Duval–Scott~~	~~+ 2' 17"~~
6	Carlos Sastre (ESP)	CSC–Saxo Bank	+ 2' 17"
7	Cadel Evans (AUS)	Silence–Lotto	+ 2' 17"
8	Denis Menchov (RUS)	Rabobank	+ 2' 17"
9	Christian Vande Velde (USA)	Garmin–Chipotle p/b H30	+ 2' 17"

General classification after stage 10

Rank	Rider	Team	Time
1	Cadel Evans (AUS)	Silence–Lotto	42h 29' 09"
2	Fränk Schleck (LUX)	CSC–Saxo Bank	+ 1"
3	Christian Vande Velde (USA)	Garmin–Chipotle p/b H30	+ 38"
DSQ	~~Bernhard Kohl (AUT)~~	~~Gerolsteiner~~	~~+ 46"~~
5	Denis Menchov (RUS)	Rabobank	+ 57"
6	Carlos Sastre (ESP)	CSC–Saxo Bank	+ 1' 28"
7	Kim Kirchen (LUX)	Team Columbia	+ 1' 56"
8	Juan José Cobo (ESP)	Saunier Duval–Scott	+ 2' 10"
DSQ	~~(Italy) Riccardo Riccò~~	~~Saunier Duval–Scott~~	~~+ 2' 29"~~
10	Vladimir Efimkin (RUS)	Ag2r–La Mondiale	+ 2' 32"

=== Rest Day 1 ===
15 July 2008

=== Stage 11 ===
16 July 2008 — Lannemezan to Foix, 167.5 km

Stage 11 profile

Stage 11 was a relatively straightforward ride through the foothills of the Pyrenees, with one first category climb over the Col de Portel at the 110 km mark, and two third category climbs.

Before the stage began, Moisés Dueñas was revealed to have failed a test for evidence of blood-doping at the end of stage 4, and was withdrawn by his team. Two more Barloworld riders withdrew injured during the stage, Félix Cárdenas and Paolo Longo Borghini. After 35 km, a 13-man breakaway, initiated by Fabian Wegmann and Kurt Asle Arvesen, formed, and with no rider within 20 minutes of the lead, came under no pressure from the main peloton. Gert Steegmans was dropped from this group on the first climb, but the rest of the breakaway increased their margin over the peloton. On the ascent of the Col de Portel, Amaël Moinard moved clear of the other escapees, and reached the top of the climb almost 2 minutes ahead of the rest of the group, while Óscar Pereiro moved ahead of the peloton, prompting a response by the CSC Saxo Bank team, and a split in the main field, but not isolating any GC contenders. Pereiro was re-integrated into the peloton with about 20 km remaining, while at the front of the race, Martin Elmiger and Arvesen attacked with 4 km left, shortly before Moinard was caught by the chasing group. They were joined by Alessandro Ballan, and briefly by Koos Moerenhout, and in the final 200m Arvesen started the sprint, hanging on to win the stage in a photo-finish. The main peloton, including all the main contenders, finished over 14 minutes behind, but leading standings were unaffected by the day's events.

Stage 11 result

Rank	Rider	Team	Time
1	Kurt Asle Arvesen (NOR)	CSC–Saxo Bank	3h 58' 13"
2	Martin Elmiger (SUI)	Ag2r–La Mondiale	s.t.
3	Alessandro Ballan (ITA)	Lampre	s.t.
4	Koos Moerenhout (NED)	Rabobank	+ 2"
5	Alexander Bocharov (RUS)	Crédit Agricole	+ 11"
6	Pierrick Fédrigo (FRA)	Bouygues Télécom	+ 14"
7	Filippo Pozzato (ITA)	Liquigas	+ 14"
8	Benoît Vaugrenard (FRA)	Française des Jeux	+ 14"
9	Fabian Wegmann (GER)	Gerolsteiner	+ 14"
10	Marco Velo (ITA)	Team Milram	+ 14"

General classification after stage 11

Rank	Rider	Team	Time
1	Cadel Evans (AUS)	Silence–Lotto	46h 42' 13"
2	Fränk Schleck (LUX)	CSC–Saxo Bank	+ 1"
3	Christian Vande Velde (USA)	Garmin–Chipotle p/b H30	+ 38"
DSQ	~~Bernhard Kohl (AUT)~~	~~Gerolsteiner~~	~~+ 46"~~
5	Denis Menchov (RUS)	Rabobank	+ 57"
6	Carlos Sastre (ESP)	CSC–Saxo Bank	+ 1' 28"
7	Kim Kirchen (LUX)	Team Columbia	+ 1' 56"
8	Juan José Cobo (ESP)	Saunier Duval–Scott	+ 2' 10"
DSQ	~~Riccardo Riccò (ITA)~~	~~Saunier Duval–Scott~~	~~+ 2' 29"~~
10	Vladimir Efimkin (RUS)	Ag2r–La Mondiale	+ 2' 32"
