= Col de la Croix-Morand =

Mountain pass in France

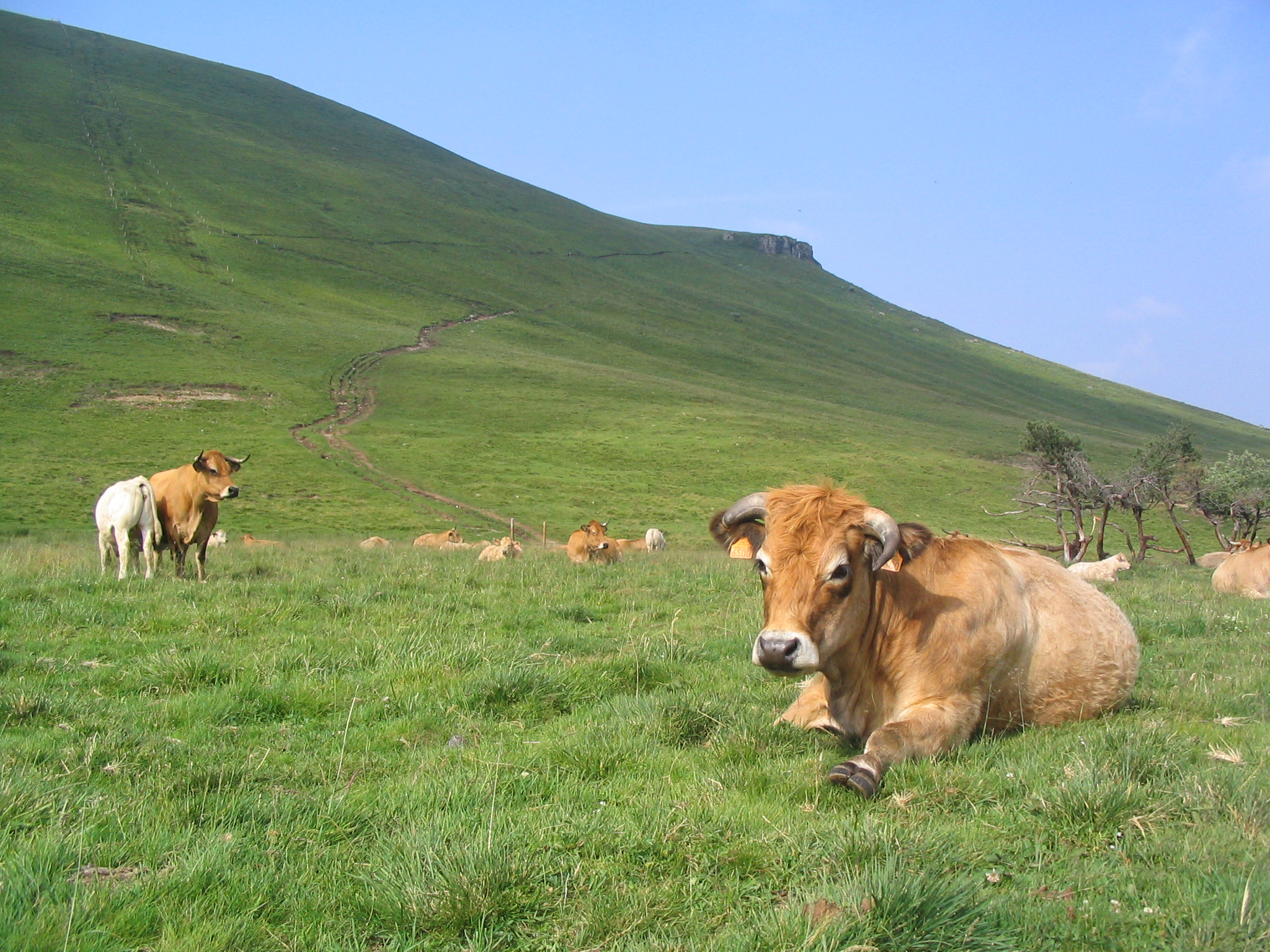
- Interactive map of Col de la Croix-Morand
- Elevation: 1,401 m (4,596 ft)
- Traversed by: D 996

Third Approach
- Location: France
- Range: Monts Dore (Massif Central)
- Coordinates: 45°35′48″N 2°51′06″E

Col de la Croix-Morand (also known as Col de Dyane) (el. 1401 m.) is a high mountain pass of the Massif Central in France, in the department of Puy de Dôme, near Clermont-Ferrand. It inspired a song by Jean-Louis Murat.

== Details of climb ==
Starting from the junction of D 983 and D 996 (west) (near Mont-Dore), the Col de la Croix Morand is 4.5 km long. Over this distance, the climb is 207 m. (an average of 4.6%). The steepest section is 6.6%.

Starting from Lac Chambon (east), the climb is 10.5 km long. Over this distance, the climb is 511 m. (an average of 4.9%). The steepest section is 8.2%.

== Appearances in Tour de France ==
The Tour de France has crossed the pass seven times, the first time in 1951.

Year	Stage	Category	Start	Finish	Leader at the summit
2025	10	3	Ennezat	Mont-Dore (Puy de Sancy)	Ben Healy (IRL)
2008	6	2	Aigurande	Super Besse	Sylvain Chavanel (FRA)
1996	14	2	Besse	Tulle	Richard Virenque (FRA)
1992	16	2	Saint-Étienne	La Bourboule	Stephen Roche (IRL)
1959	14	3	Aurillac	Clermont-Ferrand	André Le Dissez (FRA)
1952	21	2	Limoges	Clermont-Ferrand	Gino Bartali (ITA)
1951	10	2	Clermont-Ferrand	Brive-la-Gaillarde	Bernardo Ruiz (ESP)
