= Claudio Fasolo =

Italian cyclist

Personal information
- Born: 9 January 1960 (age 66) Turin, Italy

Cycling career
- Sport: Cycling
- Role: Rider

Claudio Fasolo (born 9 January 1960) is an Italian former professional racing cyclist. He rode in the 1985 Tour de France.
