= 1988 Vuelta a Andalucía =

Race details
- Dates: 2–7 February 1988
- Stages: 5 + Prologue
- Distance: 836.7 km (519.9 mi)
- Winning time: 22h 49' 05"

Results
	Winner	Edwig Van Hooydonck (BEL)
	Second	Jesús Blanco Villar (ESP)
	Third	Maarten Ducrot (NED)

The 1988 Vuelta a Andalucía was the 34th edition of the Vuelta a Andalucía cycle race and was held on 2 February to 7 February 1988. The race started in Cádiz and finished in Granada. The race was won by Edwig Van Hooydonck.

== General classification ==
Final general classification

Rank	Rider	Time
1	Edwig Van Hooydonck (BEL)	22h 49' 05"
2	Jesús Blanco Villar (ESP)	+ 4"
3	Maarten Ducrot (NED)	+ 11"
4	Adri van der Poel (NED)	+ 12"
5	Luca Gelfi (ITA)	+ 13"
6	José Enrique Carrera (ESP)	+ 15"
7	Acácio da Silva (POR)	+ 16"
8	Jörg Müller (SUI)	+ 18"
9	Leo Wellens (BEL)	+ 19"
10	Giuseppe Saronni (ITA)	+ 21"
