= Maarten Ducrot =

Dutch cyclist

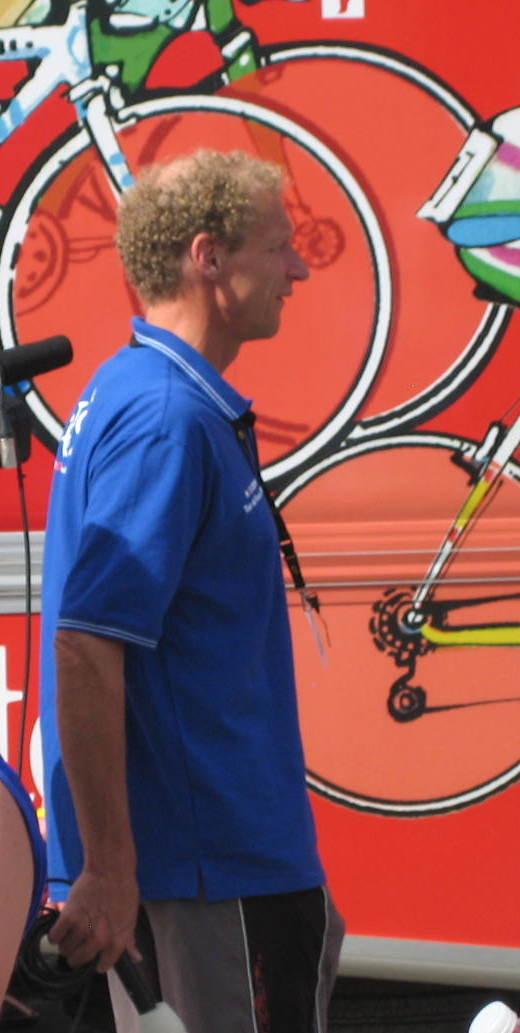
- Ducrot at the 2009 Tour de France

Personal information
- Full name: Maarten Ducrot
- Born: 8 April 1958 (age 68) Vlissingen, the Netherlands

Cycling career
- Sport: Cycling
- Discipline: Road
- Role: Rider

Amateur team
- 1984: Driessen–Transvemij–Colnago

Professional teams
- 1985–1988: Kwantum–Decosol–Yoko
- 1989: Domex–Weinmann
- 1990–1991: TVM

Major wins
- Grand Tours Tour de France 1 individual stage (1985) Combativity award (1985)
Medal record
Representing Netherlands
Summer Universiade
Silver medal – second place	1983 Edmonton	Road team time trial

Maarten Ducrot (born 8 April 1958) is a Dutch former professional road bicycle racer, and currently a cycling reporter for the Dutch television. He is the great-grandson of Auguste-Alexandre Ducrot.

== Biography ==
Ducrot rode the Tour de France five times, of which he finished four times. In his first Tour in 1985, he won the 9th stage. After the Tour, he was given the combativity award. He also competed in the team time trial event at the 1984 Summer Olympics.

Ducrot ended his professional cycling career in 1991, after which he worked as organisation advisor. Since 2004, he is a cycling reporter for the Dutch television program Studio Sport.

In January 2000, on the Dutch TV-show Reporter, he admitted that he had used cortisone and testosterone, as well as Synacthen, "a very bad medicine", and he still regrets using it. Ducrot said he used synacthen in 1982 when he was an amateur.

== Major results ==
1982
1st Team time trial, UCI Road World Championships
1983
3rd Overall Tour de l'Avenir
1984
2nd Overall Étoile des Espoirs
1985
Tour de France

1st Stage 9
Combativity award Stage 1 & Overall

1st Profronde van Wateringen
5th Overall Giro di Puglia
1986
1st Stage 2 Tour de Romandie
1st Stage 7a Critérium du Dauphiné Libéré
1st Stage 8 Coors Classic
1987
1st Stage 5 (TTT) Tour of the Netherlands
8th Overall Vuelta a Andalucía
1988
1st GP de la Liberté Fribourg
3rd Overall Vuelta a Andalucía
7th Grand Prix Impanis-Van Petegem
7th Rund um den Henninger Turm
9th GP Stad Zottegem
1989
3rd Road race, National Road Championships
5th Overall Tour of the Netherlands
1990
1st Profronde van Oostvoorne
6th Druivenkoers-Overijse
1991
10th GP Stad Zottegem

=== Grand Tour general classification results timeline ===
Grand Tour	1985	1986	1987	1988	1989	1990	1991
Giro d'Italia	—	—	—	—	—	98	—
Tour de France	81	84	DNF	—	39	66	—
Vuelta a España	—	—	—	—	—	—	113

== See also ==
- List of Dutch Olympic cyclists
- List of doping cases in cycling
