= Samuel Abt =

American sports journalist and author (1934–2025)

- Born: Samuel Raphael Abt; March 20, 1934; New York City, U.S.
- Died: July 11, 2025 (aged 91); Suresnes, France
- Education: Brown University
- Occupations: Journalist, author

Samuel Raphael Abt (March 20, 1934 – July 11, 2025) was an American sports journalist and author who covered professional cycling for 31 years, publishing articles in the New York Times and International Herald Tribune, among others. He devoted much time to chronicling the careers of English-speaking riders, especially Lance Armstrong and Greg LeMond.

Abt wrote 10 books on professional cycling, including In High Gear: The World of Professional Bicycle Racing, Lemond: The Incredible Comeback of an American Hero, and the acclaimed Breakaway: On the Road with the Tour de France. According to VeloPress, "He is the only American to have been awarded the medal of the Tour de France for distinguished service to the race."

In 1971, while working at the New York Times, Abt helped edit the Pentagon Papers.

Abt was born in Brooklyn on March 20, 1934, and grew up in Queens. He graduated from Brown University with a bachelor's degree in English literature in 1956. He lived in a suburb of Paris after his retirement.

Abt died at a hospital in Suresnes, on July 11, 2025, at the age of 91.

== Bibliography ==
- Abt, Samuel "LeMond: The Incredible Comeback" (1990) Random House, New York, NY, ISBN 978-0-394-58476-8
