= Col d'Entremont =

Mountain Pass

- Interactive map of Col d'Entremont
- Elevation: 1,220 metres (4,000 ft)
- Traversed by: D3/D680

Third Approach
- Location: Cantal, France
- Range: Mounts of Cantal (Massif Central)
- Coordinates: 45°08′42″N 2°49′00″E

Col d'Entremont (el. 1,220 metres) is a mountain pass in the Massif Central located in Auvergne, France between the towns of Dienne and Murat in the Cantal department. It is located on the watershed between the basins of the rivers Loire and Dordogne.

== Tour de France ==
The pass has been crossed several times by the Tour de France without being rated, usually in conjunction with the Pas de Peyrol, but was rated a Category Two climb for the 2008 Tour de France.

=== Appearances in the Tour de France ===
Year	Stage	Category	Start	Finish	Leader at the summit
2008	7	2	Brioude	Aurillac	David de la Fuente (ESP)
2004	10	3	Limoges	Saint-Flour	Richard Virenque (FRA)
1985	15	3	Saint-Etienne	Aurillac	Eduardo Chozas (ESP)
