= Aigurande =

- Commune
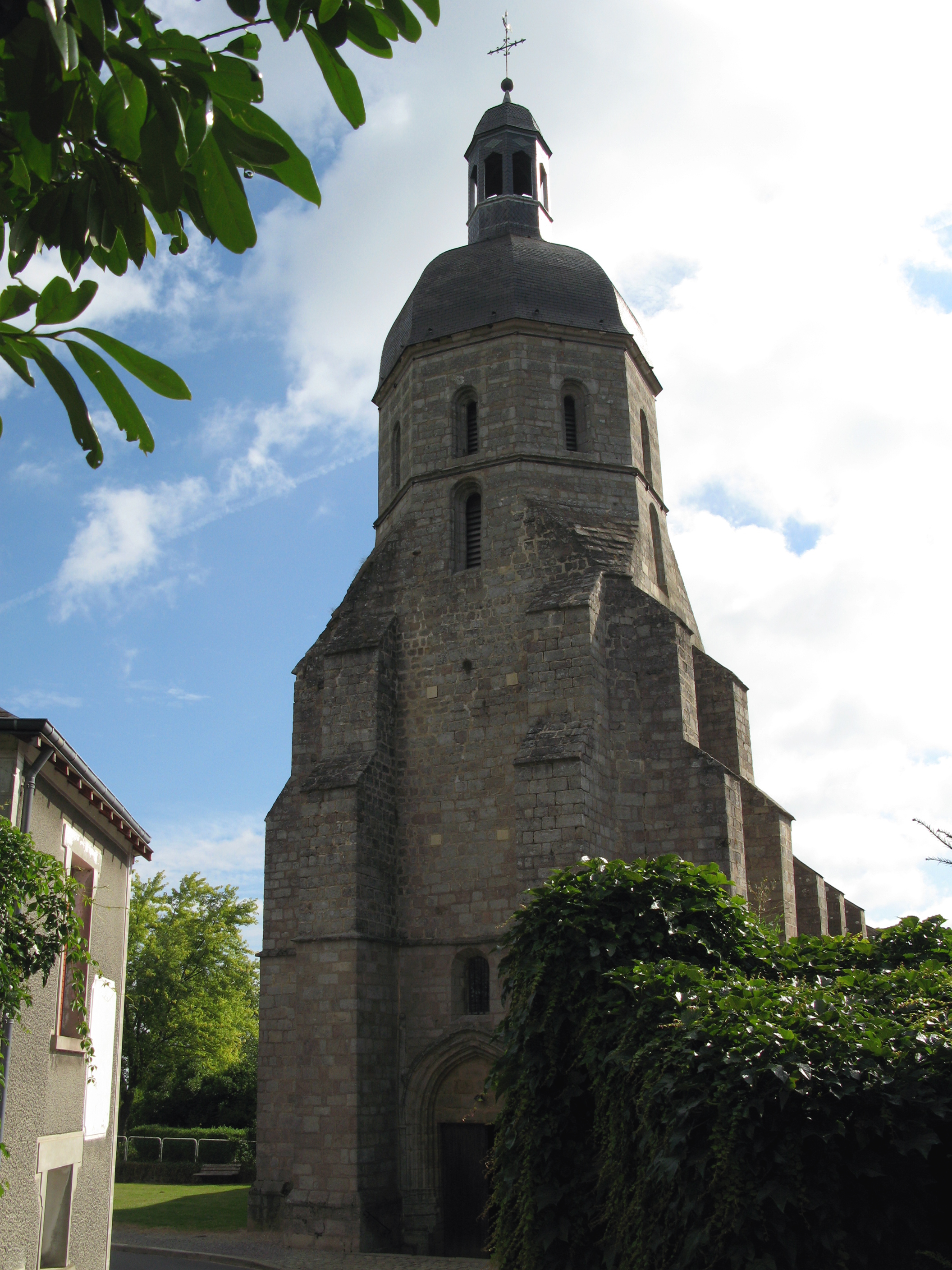
- The church in Aigurande

- Coat of arms
- Location of Aigurande
- Location within France Location within Centre-Val de Loire
- Coordinates: 46°26′05″N 1°49′47″E
- Country: France
- Region: Centre-Val de Loire
- Department: Indre
- Arrondissement: La Châtre
- Canton: Neuvy-Saint-Sépulchre
- Intercommunality: Marche Berrichonne

Government
  - Mayor (2020–2026): Virginie Fontaine
- Area^{1}: 27.77 km^{2} (10.72 sq mi)
- Elevation: 435 m (1,427 ft)
- Highest elevation: 442 m (1,450 ft)
- Lowest elevation: 284 m (932 ft)
- Population (2023): 1,321
  - Density: 47.57/km^{2} (123.2/sq mi)
- Time zone: UTC+01:00 (CET)
  - Summer (DST): UTC+02:00 (CEST)
- INSEE/Postal code: 36001 /36140
- ^{1} French Land Register data, which excludes lakes, ponds, glaciers > 1 km^{2} (0.386 sq mi or 247 acres) and river estuaries.

Aigurande (French pronunciation: [ɛɡyʁɑ̃d]) is a commune in the Indre department in central France.

== History ==
The town's name derives from the Gallic word Equoranda, which refers to a river or stream separating two Gallic tribes (in this case the Pictones (of Poitou) and the Bituriges (of the Berry).

== Geography ==
The river Bouzanne has its source in the commune.

== Population ==
Historical population
Year	Pop.	±% p.a.
1968	2,315	—
1975	2,284	−0.19%
1982	2,180	−0.66%
1990	1,932	−1.50%
1999	1,668	−1.62%
2007	1,643	−0.19%
2012	1,521	−1.53%
2017	1,428	−1.25%
2023	1,321	−1.29%
Source: INSEE

== See also ==
- Saint-Benoît-du-Sault
- Communes of the Indre department
