= List of wins by Lotto and its successors =

This is a comprehensive list of victories of the Lotto–Intermarché cycling team. The races are categorized according to the UCI Continental Circuits rules.

== 2002 – Lotto–Adecco ==
Australia Road Race Championship, Robbie McEwen
Stage 1, 3, 4 & 6 Tour Down Under, Robbie McEwen
Overall Étoile de Bessèges, Robbie McEwen

Stage 1, Robbie McEwen
Stage 3, Glenn D'Hollander

Omloop Het Volk, Peter Van Petegem
Stage 2 & 7 Paris–Nice, Robbie McEwen
Stage 1 & 3a GP Erik Breukink, Stefan Van Dijk
Grand Prix Rudy Dhaenens, Wesley Van Speybroeck
Omloop Wase Scheldeboorden, Stefan Van Dijk
Overall Three Days of the Panne, Peter Van Petegem

Stage 3b, Peter Van Petegem

La Flèche Wallonne, Mario Aerts
Scheldeprijs Vlaanderen, Robbie McEwen
Prologue Tour de Romandie, Rik Verbrugghe
Stages 4 & 10 Giro d'Italia, Robbie McEwen
Stage 7Giro d'Italia, Rik Verbrugghe
Stage 3 Tour of Belgium, Andrei Tchmil
Stage 4 Tour de Luxembourg, Guennadi Mikhailov
Netherlands Road Race Championship, Stefan Van Dijk
Stage 3 & 20 Tour de France, Robbie McEwen
Tour de Wallonie Stage 2, Frédéric Amorison
Tour de Wallonie Stage 5, Peter Van Petegem
Sparkassen Giro Bochum, Frédéric Amorison
Stage 2 Tour of Denmark, Stefan Van Dijk
Druivenkoers Overijse, Christophe Brandt
Delta Profronde, Robbie McEwen
Paris–Brussels, Robbie McEwen
Overall Circuit Franco-Belge, Robbie McEwen

Stage 2 & 3, Robbie McEwen

== 2003 – Lotto–Domo ==
Stage 3 Tour Down Under, Robbie McEwen
Stage 3 Tour of Qatar, Stefan Van Dijk
Stage 4 Étoile de Bessèges, Robbie McEwen
Le Samyn, Stefan Van Dijk
Dwars door Vlaanderen, Robbie McEwen
Tour of Flanders, Peter Van Petegem
Paris–Roubaix, Peter Van Petegem
Veenendaal–Veenendaal, Léon van Bon
Stage 4 & 11 Giro d'Italia, Robbie McEwen
Stage 3a Tour de Picardie, Stefan Van Dijk
Stage 3 Deutschland Tour, Léon van Bon
Stage 2 Tour de Suisse, Robbie McEwen
Stage 1 Tour de Wallonie, Niko Eeckhout
Overall Tour de l'Ain, Axel Merckx
Delta Profronde, Stefan Van Dijk
Memorial Rik Van Steenbergen, Niko Eeckhout
Stage 3 Rheinland-Pfalz Rundfahrt, Kevin Van Impe
Stage 4 Rheinland-Pfalz Rundfahrt, Koos Moerenhout
Stage 3 Circuit Franco-Belge, Robbie McEwen

== 2004 – Lotto–Domo ==
Stage 1 & 4 Tour Down Under, Robbie McEwen
Le Samyn, Robbie McEwen
Stage 3 Paris–Nice, Léon van Bon
Omloop van de Vlaamse Scheldeboorden, Stefan Van Dijk
Ronde van Noord-Holland, Stefan Van Dijk
Stage 5 Giro d'Italia, Robbie McEwen
Stage 3 Tour de Picardie, Stefan Van Dijk
Stage 2 & 4 Tour de Suisse, Robbie McEwen
Stage 4 Ster Elektrotoer, Niko Eeckhout
Stage 2 & 9 Tour de France, Robbie McEwen
Dwars door Gendringen, Stefan Van Dijk
Stage 5 Ronde van Nederland, Léon van Bon
Delta Profronde, Niko Eeckhout

== 2005 – Davitamon–Lotto ==
Australia Road Race Championship, Robbie McEwen
Stage 1, 2 & 6 Tour Down Under, Robbie McEwen
Stage 2 & 4 Étoile de Bessèges, Tom Steels
Stage 5 Tour of Qatar, Robbie McEwen
Stage 1 GP Costa Azul, Fred Rodriguez
Stage 2 & 3 Vuelta a Andalucía, Serge Baguet
Stage 2 Volta ao Algarve, Tom Steels
Stage 3a Three Days of De Panne, Tom Steels
Gent–Wevelgem, Nico Mattan
Stage 2 Niedersachsen-Rundfahrt, Robbie McEwen
Stage 5 Niedersachsen-Rundfahrt, Mauricio Ardila
Stage 2, 6 & 10 Giro d'Italia, Robbie McEwen
Stage 1 Tour de Picardie, Gert Steegmans
Stage 4 Tour of Belgium, Jan Kuyckx
Stage 5 Critérium du Dauphiné Libéré, Axel Merckx
Stage 4 Tour de Suisse, Robbie McEwen
Brussel–Ingooigem, Bert Roesems
Belgium Road Race Championship, Serge Baguet
Netherlands Road Race Championship, Léon van Bon
Stage 5, 7 & 13 Tour de France, Robbie McEwen
Stage 7 Deutschland Tour, Cadel Evans
Paris–Brussels, Robbie McEwen
Grand Prix de Fourmies, Robbie McEwen
Nationale Sluitingsprijs, Gert Steegmans

== 2006 – Davitamon–Lotto ==
Overall Gp Costa Azul, Robbie McEwen

Stage 1, Robbie McEwen

Stage 3 & 4 Volta ao Algarve, Gert Steegmans
Stage 2 Driedaagse van West-Vlaanderen, Robbie McEwen
Nokere Koerse, Bert Roesems
Stage 4 Tour de Georgia, Fred Rodriguez
Overall Tour de Romandie, Cadel Evans

Stage 1, Robbie McEwen
Stage 2, Chris Horner
Stage 5, Cadel Evans

Stage 3 Four Days of Dunkirk, Gert Steegmans
Stage 2, 4 & 6 Giro d'Italia, Robbie McEwen
Stage 2 Tour de Picardie, Gert Steegmans
Stage 5 Tour of Belgium, Gert Steegmans
Stage 2, 4 & 6 Tour de France, Robbie McEwen
Schaal Sels, Preben Van Hecke
Paris–Brussels, Robbie McEwen
Stage 7 Herald Sun Tour, Robbie McEwen

== 2007 – Predictor–Lotto ==
Stage 3 Jayco Bay Classic, Robbie McEwen
Stage 5 Tour Down Under, Robbie McEwen
Stage 5, Tour of Qatar, Greg Van Avermaet
Stage 1 Vuelta a Andalucía, Dario David Cioni
Stage 1 Tirreno–Adriatico, Robbie McEwen
Stage 1b (Team time trial), Settimana Internazionale di Coppi e Bartali
Stage 6 Tour of California, Fred Rodriguez
Stage 2 Tour de Romandie, Robbie McEwen
Stage 2 Giro d'Italia, Robbie McEwen
Stage 4 Tour de Suisse, Robbie McEwen
Grote Prijs Gerrie Knetemann, Olivier Kaisen
Stage 1 Tour de France, Robbie McEwen
Stage 13 Tour de France, Cadel Evans
Stage 4 Tour of Austria, Björn Leukemans
Stage 2 Tour de Wallonie, Greg Van Avermaet
Rund um die Hainleite, Greg Van Avermaet
Belgium, Time Trial Championships, Leif Hoste
Druivenkoers Overijse, Roy Sentjens
Stage 3 Eneco Tour, Robbie McEwen
Memorial Rik Van Steenbergen, Greg Van Avermaet
Overall Tour de Pologne, Johan Van Summeren

Stage 7, Johan Van Summeren

Paris–Brussels, Robbie McEwen

== 2008 – Silence–Lotto ==
Australia, Road Race Championships, Matthew Lloyd
Stage 2 Vuelta a Andalucía, Cadel Evans
Stage 4 Paris–Nice, Cadel Evans
Overall Settimana Internazionale di Coppi e Bartali, Cadel Evans

Stage 3, Cadel Evans

Stage 2 Tour de Romandie, Robbie McEwen
Stage 3 Tour of Belgium, Greg Van Avermaet
Stage 3 & 4 Tour de Suisse, Robbie McEwen
Belgium, Road Race Championships, Jürgen Roelandts
Stage 3 Tour de Wallonie, Greg Van Avermaet
Stage 2 Tour de l'Ain, Greg Van Avermaet
Grote Prijs Stad Zottegem, Roy Sentjens
Vattenfall Cyclassics, Robbie McEwen
Stage 9 Vuelta a España, Greg Van Avermaet
Points classification, Vuelta a España, Greg Van Avermaet
Paris–Brussels, Robbie McEwen
Stage 5 Tour de Pologne, Jürgen Roelandts
Stage 3 Circuit Franco-Belge, Jürgen Roelandts

== 2009 – Silence–Lotto ==
Stage 5 Settimana Internazionale di Coppi e Bartali, Cadel Evans
Stage 5 Presidential Cycling Tour of Turkey, Olivier Kaisen
Stage 20 Giro d'Italia, Philippe Gilbert
Overall Ster Elektrotoer, Philippe Gilbert

Stage 4, Philippe Gilbert

Schaal Sels, Kris Boeckmans
Road Race World Champion, Cadel Evans
Coppa Sabatini, Philippe Gilbert
Paris–Tours, Philippe Gilbert
Giro del Piemonte, Philippe Gilbert
Giro di Lombardia, Philippe Gilbert

== 2010 – Omega Pharma–Lotto ==
Amstel Gold Race, Philippe Gilbert
Stage 6 Giro d'Italia, Matthew Lloyd
Mountains classification in the Giro d'Italia, Matthew Lloyd
Stage 1 Tour of Belgium, Philippe Gilbert
Stage 3 & 19 Vuelta a España, Philippe Gilbert
Overall Circuit Franco-Belge, Adam Blythe

Stage 1 & 3, Adam Blythe

Nationale Sluitingsprijs, Adam Blythe
Giro del Piemonte, Philippe Gilbert
Giro di Lombardia, Philippe Gilbert

== 2011 – Omega Pharma–Lotto ==
Volta ao Algarve

Stage 1, Philippe Gilbert
Stage 4, André Greipel

Montepaschi Strade Bianche, Philippe Gilbert
Stage 5, Tirreno–Adriatico, Philippe Gilbert
Stage 1 Driedaagse van De Panne, André Greipel
Brabantse Pijl, Philippe Gilbert
Amstel Gold Race, Philippe Gilbert
La Flèche Wallonne, Philippe Gilbert
Liège–Bastogne–Liège, Philippe Gilbert
Stage 6 Presidential Cycling Tour of Turkey, André Greipel
Stage 7, Giro d'Italia, Bart De Clercq
Overall Tour of Belgium, Philippe Gilbert

Stages 1 & 4, André Greipel
Stage 3, Philippe Gilbert

Stage 1 Critérium du Dauphiné, Jurgen Van den Broeck
Overall Ster ZLM Tour, Philippe Gilbert

Stage 4, Philippe Gilbert

Belgium Road Race Championships, Philippe Gilbert
Belgium Time Trial Championships, Philippe Gilbert
Stage 1 Tour de France, Philippe Gilbert
Stage 10 Tour de France, André Greipel
Stage 14 Tour de France, Jelle Vanendert
Clásica San Sebastián, Philippe Gilbert
Stages 1 & 2 Eneco Tour, André Greipel
Stage 3 Eneco Tour, Philippe Gilbert
Grand Prix Cycliste de Québec, Philippe Gilbert
Grand Prix de Wallonie, Philippe Gilbert

== 2012 – Lotto–Belisol ==
Stages 1, 3 & 6 Tour Down Under, André Greipel
Stages 1 & 4 Tour of Oman, André Greipel
Stage 1 Volta ao Algarve, Gianni Meersman
Stage 4 Paris–Nice, Gianni Meersman
Grand Prix Pino Cerami, Gaëtan Bille
Stage 2 Tour of Turkey, André Greipel
Stage 12 Giro d'Italia, Lars Bak
Stages 1, 2 & 3 Tour of Belgium, André Greipel
Stages 1 & 2 Tour de Luxembourg, André Greipel
Stage 4 Tour de Luxembourg, Jürgen Roelandts
ProRace Berlin, André Greipel
Stage 2 Ster ZLM Toer, André Greipel
Stages 4, 5 & 13 Tour de France, André Greipel
Stages 1 & 2 Danmark Rundt, André Greipel
Grand Prix de Fourmies, Lars Bak
GP Impanis-Van Petegem, André Greipel
Overall Tour de l'Eurometropole, Jürgen Roelandts

Stage 1, Jürgen Roelandts

== 2013 – Lotto–Belisol ==
Stages 1 & 5 La Tropicale Amissa Bongo, Fréderique Robert
Stages 3 & 7 La Tropicale Amissa Bongo, Gert Dockx
Stages 1, 4 & 6 Tour Down Under, André Greipel
Trofeo Palma de Mallorca, Kenny Dehaes
Stage 1 Tour Méditerranéen, André Greipel
Stage 5 Tour Méditerranéen, Jürgen Roelandts
Handzame Classic, Kenny Dehaes
Grand Prix Pino Cerami, Jonas Vangenechten
Stages 4 & 5 Tour of Turkey, André Greipel
Stage 7 Giro d'Italia, Adam Hansen
Stages 1 & 2 Tour of Belgium, André Greipel
Ronde van Zeeland Seaports, André Greipel
Halle–Ingooigem, Kenny Dehaes
Germany Road Race Championships, André Greipel
Stage 6 Tour de France, André Greipel
Stage 4 Tour de Wallonie, Kenny Dehaes
Stage 4 Eneco Tour, André Greipel
Brussels Cycling Classic, André Greipel
Kampioenschap van Vlaanderen, Jens Debusschere
Overall Tour de l'Eurometropole, Jens Debusschere

Stage 1, Jens Debusschere

Nationale Sluitingsprijs, Jens Debusschere

== 2014 – Lotto–Belisol ==
Stages 4 & 6 Tour Down Under, André Greipel
Stage 5 Tour of Qatar, André Greipel
Stages 1, 3 & 6 Tour of Oman, André Greipel
Ronde van Drenthe, Kenny Dehaes
Nokere Koerse, Kenny Dehaes
Stage 1 World Ports Classic, André Greipel
Stage 4 Tour of Belgium, André Greipel
Stages 1 & 4 Tour de Luxembourg, André Greipel
Stage 2 Ster ZLM Toer, Greg Henderson
Stage 4 Ster ZLM Toer, André Greipel
Germany Road Race Championships, André Greipel
Belgium Road Race Championships, Jens Debusschere
Stage 6 Tour de France, André Greipel
Stage 11 Tour de France, Tony Gallopin
Stage 1 Tour de Wallonie, Jens Debusschere
Stage 4 Tour de Pologne, Jonas van Genechten
Overall Eneco Tour, Tim Wellens

Stage 6, Tim Wellens

Druivenkoers Overijse, Jonas van Genechten
Brussels Cycling Classic, André Greipel
Grand Prix de Fourmies, Jonas van Genechten
Stage 19 Vuelta a España, Adam Hansen
Grote Prijs Jef Scherens, André Greipel
Münsterland Giro, André Greipel
Nationale Sluitingsprijs, Jens Debusschere

== 2015 – Lotto–Soudal ==
Grand Prix Cycliste la Marseillaise, Pim Ligthart
Stage 1 Étoile de Bessèges, Kris Boeckmans
Stage 4 Étoile de Bessèges, Tony Gallopin
Stage 1a Vuelta a Andalucía, Pim Ligthart
Stage 5 Volta ao Algarve, André Greipel
Le Samyn, Kris Boeckmans
Stage 2 Paris–Nice, André Greipel
Stage 6 Paris–Nice, Tony Gallopin
Stage 1 Tirreno–Adriatico, Jens Debusschere
Nokere Koerse, Kris Boeckmans
Stage 4 Tour of Turkey, André Greipel
Stage 6 Giro d'Italia, André Greipel
Overall Tour de Picardie, Kris Boeckmans

Stages 1 & 3, Kris Boeckmans

Overall World Ports Classic, Kris Boeckmans

Stage 2, Kris Boeckmans

Stages 1 & 3 Tour de Luxembourg, André Greipel
Stage 4 Tour de Luxembourg, Sean De Bie
Overall Ster ZLM Toer, André Greipel

Stages 1 & 2, André Greipel

Stages 2, 5, 15 & 21 Tour de France, André Greipel
Overall Eneco Tour, Tim Wellens

Stage 2, André Greipel
Stage 6, Tim Wellens

Grand Prix de Wallonie, Jens Debusschere
Grand Prix Impanis-Van Petegem, Sean De Bie

== 2016 – Lotto–Soudal ==
Trofeo Felanitx-Ses Salines-Campos-Porreres, André Greipel
Trofeo Playa de Palma, André Greipel
Overall Driedaagse van West-Vlaanderen, Sean De Bie
Stage 7 Paris–Nice, Tim Wellens
Stage 4 Volta a Catalunya, Thomas de Gendt
Giro d'Italia

Stages 5, 7 & 12, André Greipel
Stage 6, Tim Wellens

Stage 1 Tour de Luxembourg, André Greipel
Germany Road Race Championships, André Greipel
Overall Tour de Pologne, Tim Wellens

Stage 5, Tim Wellens

Tour de France

Stage 12, Thomas De Gendt
Stage 21, André Greipel

Grand Prix Pino Cerami, Jelle Wallays
Stage 2 Tour de l'Ain, Tosh Van der Sande
Stage 1 Tour of Britain, André Greipel
Grand Prix de Wallonie, Tony Gallopin

== 2017 – Lotto–Soudal ==
Trofeo Porreres-Felanitx-Ses Salines-Campos, André Greipel
Trofeo Serra de Tramuntana, Tim Wellens
Trofeo Andratx-Mirador des Colomer, Tim Wellens
Stage 5 (ITT) Étoile de Bessèges, Tony Gallopin
Stage 4 Volta ao Algarve, André Greipel
Stage 5 Vuelta a Andalucía, Tim Wellens
Stage 5 Paris–Nice, André Greipel
Stage 2 Giro d'Italia, André Greipel
Stage 1 Four Days of Dunkirk, Jens Debusschere
Stage 5 Tour of Belgium, Jens Debusschere
Heistse Pijl, Jasper De Buyst
Stage 1 Critérium du Dauphiné, Thomas De Gendt
Stage 2 Tour de Wallonie, Jasper De Buyst
Stage 6 BinckBank Tour, Tim Wellens
Stage 6 Vuelta a España, Tomasz Marczyński
Stage 12 Vuelta a España, Tomasz Marczyński
Stage 18 Vuelta a España, Sander Armée
Stage 19 Vuelta a España, Thomas De Gendt
Grand Prix de Wallonie, Tim Wellens
Omloop Eurometropool, André Greipel
Binche–Chimay–Binche, Jasper de Buyst
Famenne Ardenne Classic, Moreno Hofland

== 2018 – Lotto–Soudal ==
Stages 1 & 6 Tour Down Under, André Greipel
Trofeo Serra de Tramuntana, Tim Wellens
Stage 6 Vuelta a San Juan, Jelle Wallays
Overall Vuelta a Andalucía, Tim Wellens

Stage 4, Tim Wellens

Strade Bianche, Tiesj Benoot
Stage 3 Volta Ciclista a Catalunya, Thomas De Gendt
Brabantse Pijl, Tim Wellens
Stage 2 Tour de Romandie, Thomas De Gendt
Stage 4 Giro d'Italia, Tim Wellens
Stages 2 & 5 4 Jours de Dunkerque, André Greipel
Overall Belgium Tour Jens Keukeleire

Stages 1 & 2, André Greipel
Stage 4, Jelle Vanendert

Stage 3 Tour des Fjords, Bjorg Lambrecht
Belgium National Time Trial Championships, Victor Campenaerts
Overall Tour de Wallonie, Tim Wellens

Stage 2, Tim Wellens
Stage 5, Jens Debusschere

Stages 1 & 4 Tour of Britain, André Greipel
Stage 18 Vuelta a España, Jelle Wallays
Mountains classification Vuelta a España, Thomas De Gendt

== 2019 – Lotto–Soudal ==
Stages 1 & 3 (ITT) Vuelta a Andalucía, Tim Wellens
Stage 4 UAE Tour, Caleb Ewan
Stage 7 (ITT) Tirreno–Adriatico, Victor Campenaerts
Stage 1 Volta Ciclista a Catalunya, Thomas De Gendt
Stages 4 & 6 Presidential Cycling Tour of Turkey, Caleb Ewan
Hour record, Victor Campenaerts
Stages 8 & 11 Giro d'Italia, Caleb Ewan
Stage 3 (ITT) Tour of Belgium, Tim Wellens
Stage 4 Tour of Belgium, Victor Campenaerts
Stage 8 Tour de France, Thomas De Gendt
Stages 11, 16 & 21 Tour de France, Caleb Ewan
Stage 5 Tour de Wallonie, Tosh Van der Sande
Stage 4 Binck Bank Tour, Tim Wellens
Stage 1 Danmark Rundt, Tiesj Benoot
Stage 4 Danmark Rundt, Jasper De Buyst
Brussels Cycling Classic, Caleb Ewan
Paris–Tours, Jelle Wallays

== 2020 – Lotto–Soudal ==
Stages 2 & 4 Tour Down Under, Caleb Ewan
Stage 6 Tour Down Under, Matthew Holmes
Stage 2 UAE Tour, Caleb Ewan
Stage 1 Tour de Wallonie, Caleb Ewan
Stage 3a Tour Poitou-Charentes en Nouvelle-Aquitaine, Sander Armée
Stages 3 & 11 Tour de France, Caleb Ewan
Stage 3 Tour de Luxembourg, John Degenkolb
Scheldeprijs, Caleb Ewan
Stages 5 & 14 Vuelta a España, Tim Wellens

== 2021 – Lotto–Soudal ==
Overall Étoile de Bessèges, Tim Wellens

Stage 3, Tim Wellens

Stage 7 UAE Tour, Caleb Ewan
Stage 1 Volta a Catalunya, Andreas Kron
Stage 7 Volta a Catalunya, Thomas de Gendt
Stages 5 & 7 Giro d'Italia, Caleb Ewan
Stage 1 Critérium du Dauphiné, Brent Van Moer
Stages 3 & 4 Tour of Belgium, Caleb Ewan
Stage 6 Tour de Suisse, Andreas Kron
Stage 5 Benelux Tour, Caleb Ewan

== 2022 – Lotto–Soudal ==
Trofeo Serra de Tramuntana, Tim Wellens
Trofeo Playa de Palma, Arnaud De Lie
Overall Saudi Tour, Maxim Van Gils

Stage 1, Caleb Ewan
Stage 4, Maxim Van Gils

Stage 1 Tour des Alpes-Maritimes et du Var, Caleb Ewan
Stage 2 Tour des Alpes-Maritimes et du Var, Tim Wellens
Grote Prijs Jean-Pierre Monseré, Arnaud De Lie
Stage 3 Tirreno–Adriatico, Caleb Ewan
Volta Limburg Classic, Arnaud De Lie
Stages 1 & 6 Tour of Turkey, Caleb Ewan
Overall Four Days of Dunkirk, Philippe Gilbert

Stage 3, Philippe Gilbert

Stage 8 Giro d'Italia, Thomas De Gendt
Antwerp Port Epic, Florian Vermeersch
Grote Prijs Marcel Kint, Arnaud De Lie
Heistse Pijl, Arnaud De Lie
Ronde van Limburg, Arnaud De Lie
Stage 3 Tour de Wallonie, Arnaud De Lie
Grote Prijs Jef Scherens, Victor Campenaerts
Schaal Sels, Arnaud De Lie
Egmont Cycling Race, Arnaud De Lie
Stage 1 Deutschland Tour, Caleb Ewan
Grand Prix de Fourmies, Caleb Ewan

== 2023 – Lotto–Dstny ==
Clàssica Comunitat Valenciana 1969, Arnaud De Lie
Stages 1 & 3 Étoile de Bessèges, Arnaud De Lie
Le Samyn, Milan Menten
Stage 3 Tour de Taiwan, Tijl De Decker
Grand Prix du Morbihan, Arnaud De Lie
Van Merksteijn Fences Classic, Caleb Ewan
Stage 2 Sibiu Cycling Tour, Lennert Van Eetvelt
Stage 2 Tour de Wallonie, Arnaud De Lie
Overall Vuelta a Castilla y León, Eduardo Sepúlveda

Stage 2, Eduardo Sepúlveda

Polynormande, Arnaud De Lie
Grote Prijs Jef Scherens, Arnaud De Lie
Druivenkoers Overijse, Victor Campenaerts
Egmont Cycling Race, Jasper De Buyst
Stage 2 Vuelta a España, Andreas Kron
Grand Prix Cycliste de Québec, Arnaud De Lie
Stage 2 Tour of Taihu Lake, Jarne Van de Paar
Stage 4 (ITT) Tour de Luxembourg, Victor Campenaerts
Circuit Franco–Belge, Arnaud De Lie
Famenne Ardenne Classic, Arnaud De Lie

== 2024 – Lotto–Dstny ==
Trofeo Serra de Tramuntana, Lennert Van Eetvelt
New Zealand National Time Trial Championships, Logan Currie
Stage 3 (ITT) Vuelta a Andalucía, Maxim Van Gils
Overall UAE Tour, Lennert Van Eetvelt

Stage 7, Lennert Van Eetvelt

Grand Prix Criquielion, Alec Segaert
Grote Prijs Jean-Pierre Monseré, Jarne Van de Paar
Stage 5 Settimana Internazionale di Coppi e Bartali, Jenno Berckmoes
Famenne Ardenne Classic, Arnaud De Lie
Eschborn–Frankfurt, Maxim Van Gils
Tro-Bro Léon, Arnaud De Lie
Circuit de Wallonie, Arnaud De Lie
Grosser Preis des Kantons Aargau, Maxim Van Gils
Belgium National Road Race Championships, Arnaud De Lie
Stage 4 Okolo Slovenska, Johannes Adamietz
Stage 18 Tour de France, Victor Campenaerts
Overall Danmark Rundt, Arnaud De Lie
Muur Classic Geraardsbergen, Jenno Berckmoes
Stage 2 (ITT) Renewi Tour, Alec Segaert
Stage 5 Renewi Tour, Arnaud De Lie
Binche–Chimay–Binche, Arnaud De Lie
Stage 2 Tour of Taihu Lake, Steffen De Schuyteneer
Overall Tour of Guangxi, Lennert Van Eetvelt

Stage 1, Lionel Taminiaux
Stage 5, Lennert Van Eetvelt

== 2025 – Lotto ==
Stage 3 Étoile de Bessèges, Arnaud De Lie
Stage 7 Presidential Tour of Turkey, Elia Viviani
Stage 4 Tour of Belgium, Jenno Berckmoes
Overall Renewi Tour, Arnaud De Lie

Stage 5, Arnaud De Lie

Bretagne Classic Ouest-France, Arnaud De Lie
Overall Tour of Istanbul, Mauro Cuylits

Stage 1, Mauro Cuylits
Stage 3, Steffen De Schuyteneer

Grand Prix de Wallonie, Arnaud De Lie
Super 8 Classic, Arnaud De Lie
Paris–Chauny, Arnaud De Lie

== 2026 – Lotto–Intermarché ==
Stage 2 Étoile de Bessèges, Mathieu Kockelmann
Stage 2 Tour of Oman, Baptiste Veistroffer
Overall Tour de Taiwan, Matys Grisel

Stage 2 Tour de Taiwan, Matthew Fox
Stage 3 Tour de Taiwan, Matys Grisel

== Supplementary statistics ==
=== 1985 to 2005 ===
Grand Tours by highest finishing position
| Race | 1985 | 1986 | 1987 | 1988 | 1989 | 1990 | 1991 | 1992 | 1993 | 1994 | 1995 | 1996 | 1997 | 1998 | 1999 | 2000 | 2001 | 2002 | 2003 | 2004 | 2005 |
| Giro d'Italia | – | – | – | – | – | – | – | – | – | – | – | – | – | – | – | – | 42 | 9 | 52 | 14 | 11 |
| Tour de France | 14 | 51 | 26 | – | – | 9 | 35 | 51 | 83 | 24 | 71 | 77 | 25 | 16 | 11 | 17 | 27 | 35 | 52 | 21 | 8 |
| Vuelta a España | – | – | – | – | – | – | – | – | – | – | – | – | – | – | – | – | – | – | – | – | – |
Major week-long stage races by highest finishing position
| Race | 1985 | 1986 | 1987 | 1988 | 1989 | 1990 | 1991 | 1992 | 1993 | 1994 | 1995 | 1996 | 1997 | 1998 | 1999 | 2000 | 2001 | 2002 | 2003 | 2004 | 2005 |
| Tour Down Under | Did not Exist | | | | | | | | | | | | | | – | – | 40 | 13 | 33 | 2 | 4 |
| Paris–Nice | – | – | – | – | 14 | 22 | 7 | 30 | 30 | 12 | 7 | – | 47 | 22 | 10 | 17 | 6 | 9 | 58 | 42 | 8 |
| Tirreno–Adriatico | – | – | – | – | – | – | – | – | – | – | – | – | – | – | – | – | – | 25 | 45 | 22 | 20 |
| Volta a Catalunya | – | – | – | – | – | – | 27 | – | – | 31 | 57 | – | 58 | 56 | 44 | – | – | 25 | – | – | 13 |
| Tour of the Basque Country | – | – | – | – | – | – | 2 | 33 | 29 | 16 | 96 | – | 32 | 40 | 4 | 27 | 12 | 5 | 50 | – | 15 |
| Tour de Romandie | 14 | 10 | 6 | – | – | – | – | – | 16 | 34 | – | – | 4 | 11 | – | – | 8 | 13 | – | – | 12 |
| Critérium du Dauphiné | – | – | – | – | 32 | 59 | 16 | 45 | 32 | 16 | 33 | 38 | 5 | 3 | 13 | 11 | 13 | 20 | – | – | 12 |
| Tour de Suisse | 18 | 42 | 27 | 5 | – | 27 | 37 | – | – | – | – | 44 | – | – | – | 42 | – | – | 45 | 18 | 15 |
| Tour de Pologne | – | – | – | – | – | – | – | – | – | – | – | – | – | – | – | 7 | 9 | 23 | – | – | DNF |
| Eneco Tour | – | 35 | 2 | 22 | 16 | – | – | – | – | – | 48 | – | – | – | – | 40 | 4 | 19 | 32 | 36 | 12 |
Monument races by highest finishing position
| Monument | 1985 | 1986 | 1987 | 1988 | 1989 | 1990 | 1991 | 1992 | 1993 | 1994 | 1995 | 1996 | 1997 | 1998 | 1999 | 2000 | 2001 | 2002 | 2003 | 2004 | 2005 |
| Milan–San Remo | 15 | 21 | 13 | 49 | – | 9 | 48 | 3 | 20 | 9 | 14 | 10 | 32 | 5 | 1 | 18 | 18 | 7 | 30 | 10 | 16 |
| Tour of Flanders | 22 | 5 | 5 | 27 | 40 | 8 | 2 | 14 | 26 | 3 | 3 | 6 | 4 | 3 | 7 | 1 | 9 | 3 | 1 | 2 | 3 |
| Paris–Roubaix | 7 | 7 | 7 | 45 | 32 | 12 | 10 | 10 | 18 | 1 | 2 | 6 | 2 | 12 | 5 | 24 | 8 | 12 | 1 | 6 | 6 |
| Liège–Bastogne–Liège | 24 | 6 | 86 | 2 | 5 | 14 | 2 | 17 | 4 | 11 | 12 | – | 9 | 20 | 11 | 16 | 22 | 7 | 30 | 25 | 5 |
| Giro di Lombardia | – | – | – | 30 | – | 6 | 9 | 56 | 16 | 60 | – | – | – | 17 | 14 | 17 | DNF | – | 33 | 40 | 19 |
Classics by highest finishing position
| Classic | 1985 | 1986 | 1987 | 1988 | 1989 | 1990 | 1991 | 1992 | 1993 | 1994 | 1995 | 1996 | 1997 | 1998 | 1999 | 2000 | 2001 | 2002 | 2003 | 2004 | 2005 |
| Omloop Het Volk | 3 | - | 3 | 8 | 10 | 4 | 6 | 13 | 4 | 5 | 3 | 4 | 5 | 3 | 4 | 8 | 2 | 1 | 10 | - | 13 |
| Kuurne–Brussels–Kuurne | 2 | - | 10 | – | 25 | 1 | 3 | 25 | - | 7 | 4 | 5 | 6 | 1 | 1 | 1 | 2 | 2 | 2 | 32 | 3 |
| E3 Harelbeke | 2 | 6 | 3 | 19 | 16 | 6 | 4 | 1 | 8 | 1 | 19 | 3 | 5 | 4 | 2 | 11 | 1 | 5 | 13 | 9 | 3 |
| Gent–Wevelgem | 6 | 17 | 12 | 14 | 15 | 2 | 8 | 7 | 14 | 4 | 7 | 9 | 2 | 4 | 7 | – | 6 | 12 | 17 | 11 | 1 |
| Amstel Gold Race | 2 | 3 | 14 | 18 | 14 | 9 | 10 | 2 | 29 | – | – | 6 | 13 | 8 | 17 | 11 | 3 | 6 | 37 | 5 | 7 |
| La Flèche Wallonne | 35 | 20 | 43 | 37 | 3 | 19 | 2 | 10 | 10 | 19 | 53 | 50 | 9 | 13 | 3 | 2 | 1 | 1 | 39 | 18 | 9 |
| Clásica de San Sebastián | – | – | – | – | – | 41 | 43 | 72 | 60 | 5 | 14 | 22 | 24 | 19 | 2 | 2 | 5 | 10 | 24 | 8 | 15 |

=== 2006 to present ===
Grand Tours by highest finishing position
| Race | 2006 | 2007 | 2008 | 2009 | 2010 | 2011 | 2012 | 2013 | 2014 | 2015 | 2016 | 2017 | 2018 | 2019 | 2020 | 2021 | 2022 | 2023 | 2024 |
| Giro d'Italia | 17 | 20 | 7 | 17 | 21 | 22 | 19 | 20 | 14 | 11 | 15 | 13 | 57 | 51 | 41 | 79 | 48 | – | – |
| Tour de France | 4 | 2 | 2 | 13 | 3 | 19 | 4 | 38 | 13 | 31 | 40 | 20 | 65 | 59 | 52 | 65 | 68 | 59 | 81 |
| Vuelta a España | 75 | 4 | 33 | 3 | 17 | 8 | 17 | 41 | 16 | 14 | 16 | 19 | 42 | 8 | 24 | 20 | 80 | 32 | |
Major week-long stage races by highest finishing position
| Race | 2006 | 2007 | 2008 | 2009 | 2010 | 2011 | 2012 | 2013 | 2014 | 2015 | 2016 | 2017 | 2018 | 2019 | 2020 | 2021 | 2022 | 2023 | 2024 |
| Tour Down Under | 3 | 4 | 16 | 16 | 8 | 7 | 27 | 16 | 9 | 17 | 8 | 7 | 27 | 36 | 33 | NH | | – | – |
| Paris–Nice | 30 | 7 | 3 | 15 | 8 | 48 | 26 | 17 | 10 | 6 | 8 | 10 | 5 | 30 | 14 | 11 | 16 | 28 | 43 |
| Tirreno–Adriatico | 88 | 28 | 36 | 12 | 12 | 9 | 64 | 65 | 44 | 11 | 22 | 44 | 4 | 12 | 48 | 7 | 99 | – | – |
| Volta a Catalunya | 37 | 45 | 13 | 54 | 26 | 27 | 3 | 9 | 19 | 16 | 20 | 59 | 28 | 36 | NH | 16 | 29 | 15 | 63 |
| Tour of the Basque Country | 8 | 13 | 2 | 4 | 4 | 13 | 12 | 22 | 22 | 34 | 11 | 36 | 18 | 19 | NH | 61 | 16 | – | – |
| Tour de Romandie | 1 | 4 | 35 | 7 | 24 | 29 | 112 | 7 | 26 | 14 | 14 | 31 | 31 | 15 | NH | 25 | 11 | 29 | 16 |
| Critérium du Dauphiné | 46 | 2 | 2 | 2 | 4 | 4 | 5 | 29 | 3 | 15 | 18 | 10 | 14 | 12 | 30 | 37 | 14 | 33 | 18 |
| Tour de Suisse | 10 | 29 | 33 | 16 | 42 | 13 | 14 | 25 | 31 | 60 | 16 | 23 | 20 | 4 | NH | 20 | 16 | 58 | 28 |
| Tour de Pologne | 2 | 1 | 27 | 44 | 12 | 21 | 96 | 27 | 22 | 2 | 1 | 15 | 18 | 18 | 12 | 6 | 11 | 11 | |
| BinckBank Tour | 14 | 4 | 9 | 4 | 10 | 2 | 50 | 31 | 1 | 1 | 16 | 2 | 3 | 3 | 9 | 4 | NH | 2 | |
Monument races by highest finishing position
| Monument | 2006 | 2007 | 2008 | 2009 | 2010 | 2011 | 2012 | 2013 | 2014 | 2015 | 2016 | 2017 | 2018 | 2019 | 2020 | 2021 | 2022 | 2023 | 2024 |
| Milan–San Remo | 18 | 4 | 47 | 13 | 9 | 3 | 52 | 16 | 23 | 9 | 3 | 18 | 22 | 29 | 9 | 2 | 34 | 16 | 7 |
| Tour of Flanders | 4 | 2 | 8 | 3 | 3 | 9 | 67 | 3 | 23 | 5 | 17 | 17 | 8 | 9 | 9 | 25 | 33 | 12 | 27 |
| Paris–Roubaix | 8 | 4 | 6 | 4 | 8 | 14 | 73 | 24 | 58 | 9 | 7 | 7 | 10 | 29 | NH | 2 | 30 | 12 | 20 |
| Liège–Bastogne–Liège | 8 | 36 | 7 | 4 | 3 | 1 | 10 | 18 | 11 | 20 | 22 | 19 | 11 | 11 | 33 | 24 | 31 | 11 | 4 |
| Il Lombardia | 55 | 6 | 18 | 1 | 1 | 8 | 50 | 35 | 4 | 7 | DNF | 20 | 5 | 24 | 49 | 33 | 41 | 10 | |
Classics by highest finishing position
| Classic | 2006 | 2007 | 2008 | 2009 | 2010 | 2011 | 2012 | 2013 | 2014 | 2015 | 2016 | 2017 | 2018 | 2019 | 2020 | 2021 | 2022 | 2023 | 2024 |
| Omloop Het Nieuwsblad | 3 | 9 | 7 | 4 | 26 | 9 | 46 | 8 | 13 | 12 | 3 | 15 | 21 | 3 | 8 | 5 | 5 | 2 | 10 |
| Kuurne–Brussels–Kuurne | 6 | 17 | 20 | 61 | 15 | 3 | 10 | - | 14 | 7 | 20 | 4 | 15 | 7 | 18 | 17 | 2 | 7 | 8 |
| Strade Bianche | NH | — | — | — | 13 | 1 | – | – | – | – | 8 | 3 | 1 | 5 | 25 | 13 | 8 | 10 | 3 |
| E3 Harelbeke | 9 | 6 | 3 | 24 | 26 | 2 | 60 | 60 | 6 | 7 | 7 | 14 | 5 | 14 | NH | 14 | 28 | 24 | 13 |
| Gent–Wevelgem | 12 | 6 | 33 | 26 | 3 | 4 | 31 | 11 | 10 | 5 | 7 | 7 | 5 | 13 | 6 | 27 | 19 | 4 | 29 |
| Amstel Gold Race | 20 | 18 | 17 | 4 | 1 | 1 | 2 | 13 | 2 | 6 | 10 | 15 | 6 | 6 | NH | 10 | 20 | 4 | 20 |
| La Flèche Wallonne | 35 | 29 | 2 | 5 | 6 | 1 | 4 | 39 | 6 | 31 | 18 | 17 | 3 | 4 | 21 | 36 | 23 | 8 | 3 |
| Clásica de San Sebastián | 81 | 34 | 11 | 2 | 11 | 1 | 3 | 76 | 5 | 19 | 2 | 2 | 20 | 7 | NH | 12 | 49 | 22 | |

Legend
| — | Did not compete |
| DNF | Did not finish |
| NH | Not held |
