= Dietrich Thurau =

German cyclist

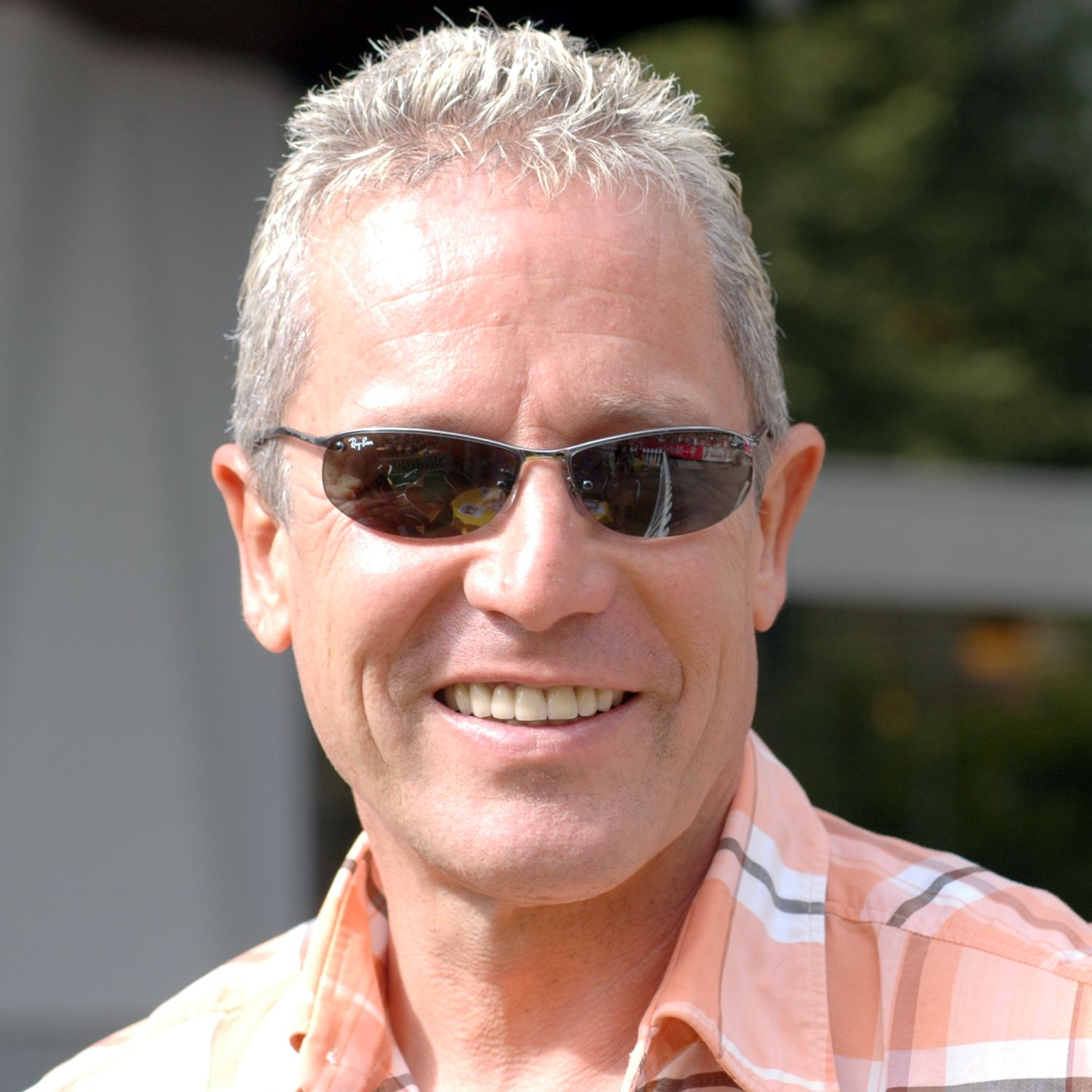
- Thurau at the 2006 Deutschland Tour

Personal information
- Full name: Dietrich Thurau
- Born: 9 November 1954 (age 71) Frankfurt, West Germany

Cycling career
- Sport: Cycling
- Disciplines: Road and Track
- Role: Rider

Professional teams
- 1974–1977: TI–Raleigh
- 1978–1979: IJsboerke
- 1980: Puch - Sem
- 1981–1982: Kotter
- 1982: Hoonved
- 1982–1983: Toshiba
- 1983: Del Tongo - Colnago
- 1984: Portas
- 1985: Hitachi - Splendor
- 1986: Supermercati Brianzoli
- 1987: Roland - Skala
- 1987–1988: Panasonic - Isostar
- 1989: Brügelmann

Major wins
- Grand Tours Tour de France 6 individual stages (1977, 1979) Giro d'Italia 2 individual stages (1978) Vuelta a España Points classification (1976) 5 individual stages (1976) One-day races and Classics National Road Race Championship (1975, 1976) Liège–Bastogne–Liège (1976) E3 Prijs Vlaanderen (1977) Scheldeprijs (1978)
Medal record
Men's road bicycle racing
Representing West Germany
World Championships
| Silver medal – second place | 1977 San Christóbal | Elite Road Race |
| Silver medal – second place | 1979 Valkenburg | Elite Road Race |

Dietrich "Didi" Thurau (German pronunciation: [ˈdiːtʁɪç ˈtuːʁaʊ]; born 9 November 1954) is a retired German professional road bicycle racer. His biggest career achievements include winning the one-day classic, Liège–Bastogne–Liège, his home country's Deutschland Tour and surprising the field at the 1977 Tour de France by capturing four stages and holding the yellow jersey as leader of the general classification from the prologue for 15 days. Thurau did win the young rider classification although he lost the overall lead to eventual winner Bernard Thévenet.

Thurau was German pursuit champion three times and won 29 six-day races. He is the father of former professional cyclist Björn Thurau. In 1989, he revealed he had doped throughout his career.

== Career ==
He won the German National Road Race in 1975 and 1976. After his victory in the points classification in the Vuelta a España and a fourth place in the general classification in the Vuelta a España in 1976, Thurau was seen as a talented rider, but not seen as a rider for the general classification. This changed when he won the prologue 1977 Tour de France, won time trials and mountain stages, keeping the lead until far in the race, finishing fifth in the overall classification and won the young rider classification.

Thurau signed a contract to ride the 1978 season as a team leader at IJsboerke. Before his contract started, but after he signed it, he rode the 1977 UCI Road World Championships. Seven kilometers before the finish, he was away together with Francesco Moser, and Moser punctured. To the surprise of commentators, including the coach of the French team Jacques Anquetil and Thurau's team leader Peter Post, Thurau waited for Moser, and was beaten in the sprint by Moser. This caused rumours that Thurau had sold the championship to Moser; it later became clear that Thurau's new bosses at IJsboerke did not want Thurau to ride in the rainbow jersey, but wanted him to keep his sponsored jersey.

Thurau's primary goals for the next season became the 1978 Giro d'Italia and the 1978 UCI Road World Championships, and his team skipped the 1978 Tour de France, because they felt there were too many mountain finishes for a rider like Thurau. Although Thurau won two stages in the 1978 Giro, it did not go as expected, as he had to abandon the race in the tenth stage, when he had already given up all hopes for the general classification.

In 1979, Thurau won Liège–Bastogne–Liège, and again came second in the 1979 UCI Road World Championships, but he was no longer seen as able to win a grand tour, and he changed teams. He continued as a professional cyclist for several years, but did not win any major races.

== Doping ==
Thurau tested positive for stimulants after Stage 8 of the 1987 Tour de France. He was fined 5,000 FF (£500), incurred a 10-minute time penalty, placed last on the stage and was given a one-month suspended ban. However, by the time the positive result was revealed, Thurau had already abandoned the Tour.

After he had retired, in 1989, he gave an interview to the Bild newspaper, in Germany, where he revealed he had doped throughout his career, including the use of Amphetamines, Testosterone and Cortisone.

== Personal life ==
In 1998, Thurau was fined 20,000 DM for forgery. In 2012, it was reported that he had embezzled 49,000 EUR in insurance benefits, which were meant for his father, Helmut, to pay for his nursing home. Instead, Thurau kept the money. He was convicted of the offence and was fined 39,900 EUR.

His son Björn Thurau is also a racing cyclist, banned for doping, whilst Björn's younger brother Urs is a tennis player who is coached by Dietrich.

== Major results ==
=== Road ===
1972
1st Road race, National Junior Road Championships
1975
1st Road race, National Road Championships
1st Overall Tour de l'Oise

1st Stage 1

1st Grand Prix de Fourmies
2nd Overall Tour d'Indre-et-Loire
2nd Scheldeprijs
2nd Grand Prix of Aargau Canton
2nd Bruxelles–Meulebeke
3rd Overall Vuelta a Andalucía
3rd GP Union Dortmund
4th Overall Ronde van Nederland
6th Overall Paris–Nice
8th Amstel Gold Race
8th Paris–Brussels
9th Critérium des As
10th Overall Tour de Suisse
1976
1st Road race, National Road Championships
2nd Grand Prix de Fourmies
2nd GP Union Dortmund
4th Overall Vuelta a España

1st Points classification
1st Prologue & Stages 9, 16, 18 & 19b (ITT)
Held after Prologue & Stages 9–14

7th Overall Vuelta a Andalucía
7th La Flèche Wallonne
8th Overall Tour de Suisse

1st Stage 5

8th Gent–Wevelgem
1977
1st Overall Vuelta a Andalucía

1st Stages 1a, 2a, 2b, 3, 4, 5, 6 & 7a (ITT)

1st E3 Prijs Vlaanderen
1st Grand Prix of Aargau Canton
1st GP Union Dortmund
2nd Road race, UCI World Championships
2nd Rund um den Henninger Turm
3rd Liège–Bastogne–Liège
3rd Omloop der Beide Vlaanderen
4th Overall Four Days of Dunkirk
5th Overall Tour de France

1st Young rider classification
1st Prologue & Stages 2, 5b (ITT), 16 & 22a (ITT)
Held after Prologue & Stages 1–15a
Held after Prologue & Stages 2–3

7th Overall Tour de Suisse
8th Overall Paris–Nice
8th Paris–Roubaix
8th Polynormande
1978
1st Overall Étoile de Bessèges

1st Stages 2, 3, 4 & 5

1st Scheldeprijs
1st Züri–Metzgete
Giro d'Italia

1st Prologue & Stage 4 (ITT)

1st Stage 2 Tour de Suisse
2nd Liège–Bastogne–Liège
3rd Overall Tour of Belgium

1st Stage 1a (ITT)

3rd La Flèche Wallonne
5th Omloop Het Volk
9th Amstel Gold Race
9th Paris–Brussels
1979
1st Overall Vuelta a Andalucía

1st Prologue & Stages 1 & 2

1st Overall Deutschland Tour

1st Prologue

1st Liège–Bastogne–Liège
1st Stage 5 Paris–Nice
1st Stage 1a (TTT) Tour of Belgium
2nd Road race, UCI World Championships
4th E3 Prijs Vlaanderen
6th Omloop Het Volk
9th Gran Premio di Lugano
10th OverallTour de France

1st Stage 19

1980
3rd Paris–Roubaix
4th Overall Tour du Tarn

1st Stage 2

7th Rund um den Henninger Turm
1981
Deutschland Tour

1st Prologue & Stage 4

2nd Rund um den Henninger Turm
7th Overall Tour de Suisse
1983
5th Overall Giro d'Italia
1986
10th US Pro Championship
1987
7th Overall Tour de Suisse

1st Stage 4 (ITT)

Tour de France

Held after Stages 3 & 4

=== Grand Tour general classification results timeline ===
| Grand Tour | 1974 | 1975 | 1976 | 1977 | 1978 | 1979 | 1980 | 1981 | 1982 | 1983 | 1984 | 1985 | 1986 | 1987 | 1988 |
|---|---|---|---|---|---|---|---|---|---|---|---|---|---|---|---|
| Vuelta a España | — | — | 4 | — | — | — | — | — | — | 36 | — | — | — | — | — |
| Giro d'Italia | — | — | — | — | DNF | — | — | 14 | DNF | 5 | — | — | 18 | 52 | — |
| Tour de France | — | — | — | 5 | — | 10 | DNF | — | DNF | — | — | DNF | — | DNF | — |

=== Classics results timeline ===
Monuments results timeline
| Monument | 1974 | 1975 | 1976 | 1977 | 1978 | 1979 | 1980 | 1981 | 1982 | 1983 | 1984 | 1985 | 1986 | 1987 | 1988 |
|---|---|---|---|---|---|---|---|---|---|---|---|---|---|---|---|
| Milan–San Remo | — | — | — | 22 | 26 | 22 | 14 | 54 | — | — | — | — | — | — | — |
| Tour of Flanders | — | — | 20 | 9 | 28 | DSQ | — | — | — | — | — | — | — | — | — |
| Paris–Roubaix | — | — | 23 | 8 | 12 | 14 | 3 | 31 | — | — | — | — | — | — | — |
| Liège–Bastogne–Liège | — | 32 | 14 | 3 | 2 | 1 | DNF | — | — | — | — | — | — | 71 | — |
| Giro di Lombardia | Did not contest during career | | | | | | | | | | | | | | |

=== Major championship results timeline ===
| | 1974 | 1975 | 1976 | 1977 | 1978 | 1979 | 1980 | 1981 | 1982 | 1983 | 1984 | 1985 | 1986 | 1987 | 1988 |
|---|---|---|---|---|---|---|---|---|---|---|---|---|---|---|---|
| World Championships | — | DNF | 49 | 2 | 14 | 2 | — | 62 | 34 | — | — | DNF | DNF | DNF | — |
| National Championships | — | 1 | 1 | — | — | — | — | — | — | — | — | — | — | — | — |

Legend
| — | Did not compete |
| DNF | Did not finish |
| DSQ | Disqualified |

=== Track ===
1979
1st Six Days of Munich (with Patrick Sercu)
1984
1st Six Days of Bremen (with Albert Fritz)
1986
1st Six Days of Bremen (with Josef Kristen)
1st Six Days of Munich (with Danny Clark)
1987
1st Six Days of Bremen (with Danny Clark)
1st Six Days of Munich (with Urs Freuler)

== See also ==
- List of doping cases in cycling

Awards
| Preceded by (Germany) Gregor Braun | German Sportsman of the Year; 1977 | Succeeded by (Germany) Eberhard Gienger |
