= Laurent Fignon =

French cyclist (1960–2010)

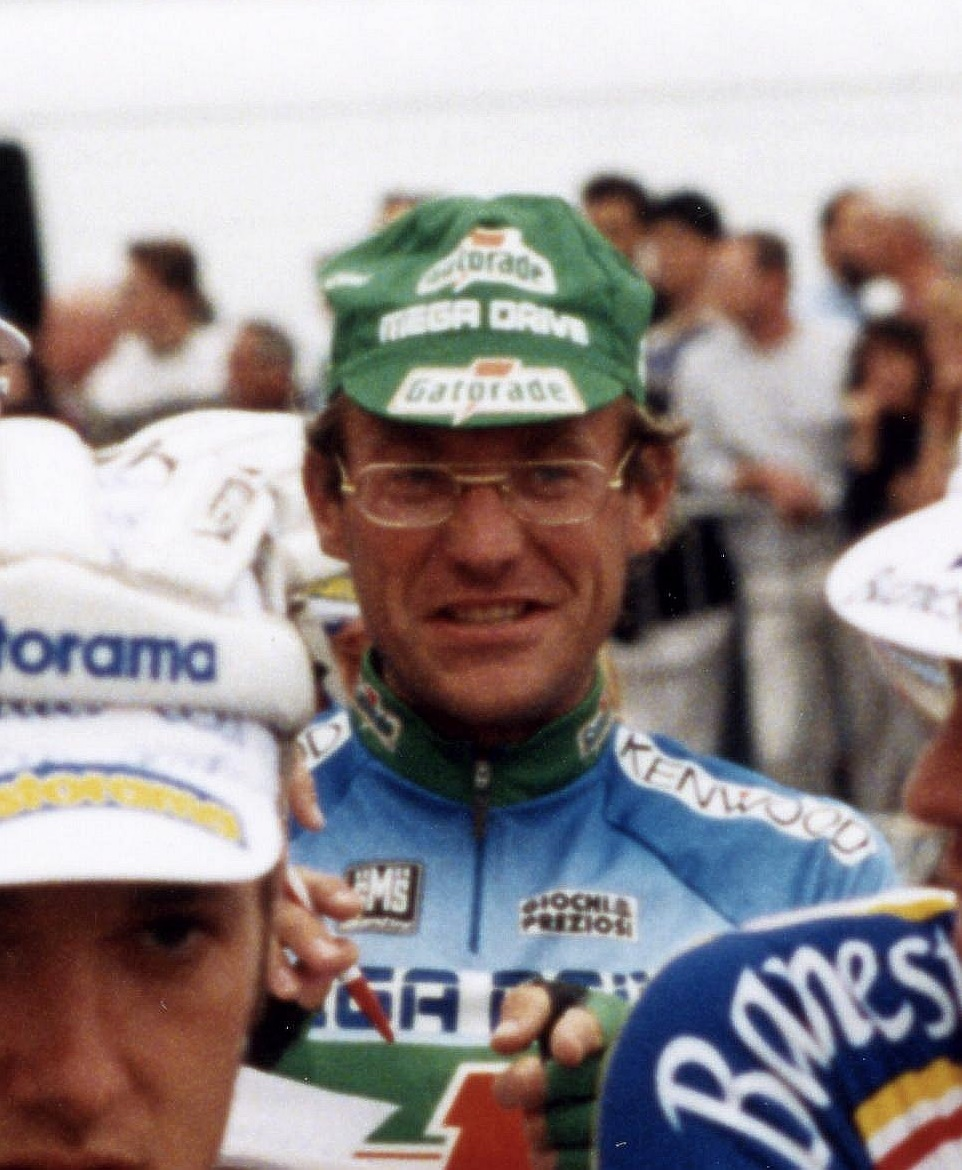
- Fignon at the 1993 Tour de France

Personal information
- Full name: Laurent Patrick Fignon
- Nickname: Le Professeur (The Professor)
- Born: 12 August 1960 Paris, France
- Died: 31 August 2010 (aged 50) Paris, France
- Height: 1.74 m (5 ft 8 1/2 in)
- Weight: 67 kg (148 lb; 10 st 8 lb)

Cycling career
- Sport: Cycling
- Discipline: Road
- Role: Rider
- Rider type: All-rounder

Professional teams
- 1982–1985: Renault–Elf–Gitane
- 1986–1989: Système U
- 1990–1991: Castorama
- 1992–1993: Gatorade–Chateau d'Ax

Major wins
- Grand Tours Tour de France General classification (1983, 1984) Young rider classification (1983) Combination classification (1983, 1984) 9 individual stages (1983, 1984, 1987, 1989, 1992) 3 TTT stages (1984, 1986, 1989) Combativity award (1989) Giro d'Italia General classification (1989) Mountains classification (1984) 2 individual stages (1984, 1989) 2 TTT stages (1982, 1984) Vuelta a España Combination classification (1987) 2 individual stages (1983, 1987) One-Day races and Classics National Road Race Championships (1984) Milan–San Remo (1988, 1989) La Flèche Wallonne (1986)

Laurent Patrick Fignon (French pronunciation: [loʁɑ̃ fiɲɔ̃]; 12 August 1960 – 31 August 2010) was a French professional road bicycle racer who won the Tour de France in 1983 and 1984, as well as the Giro d'Italia in 1989. He held the title of FICP World No. 1 in 1989. Fignon came close to winning the Tour de France for a third time in 1989 but was defeated by Greg LeMond by eight seconds, the closest margin ever to decide the Tour. Fignon won many classic races, including consecutive victories in Milan–San Remo in 1988 and 1989. He died from cancer in 2010.

== Early life and amateur career ==
Fignon was born in Montmartre, Paris. His family moved to Tournan-en-Brie in 1963, where he lived until he left for Paris at age 23.

Laurent Fignon's first sport was football, and he reached the level of playing for his département or area. However, friends persuaded him to try cycling, and in 1976, he participated in his first official race, which he won. Despite his parents' opposition to his racing, Fignon continued to compete without their knowledge. He won four more races in his first year, but only one in his second year. However, in his third year, he won 18 out of 36 races. Eventually, Fignon's parents allowed him to race, though they still believed he should prioritize his studies.

Fignon enrolled at the University of Villetaneuse, where he studied Structural and Materials Science. Fignon was not interested in his studies and was an indifferent student. His chief desire was to pursue cycling. (Note: Quote: I thought about cycling from morning until night. And as soon as I woke up all I thought about was my bike. In the evening I went to sleep dreaming about being on my bike. Cycling. Nothing but cycling.) He eventually informed his parents of his decision to leave university and join the army at the end of the year for his mandatory military service. He was posted at the Bataillon de Joinville, known for its sporting reputation. After this, Fignon was sure he wanted to pursue a professional career.

In 1981, Fignon rode the Tour of Corsica, which allowed amateur cyclists to ride along with professional riders. Fignon rode an early stage attempting to hold the wheel of Bernard Hinault, the top professional cyclist, and succeeded for much of the race. Cyrille Guimard observed the young cyclist a few days later at the national 100 km team time trial. Fignon did win on the tenth of April 1981 the second stage during Tour du Vaucluse. In May 1981, he offered him a place on his Renault–Elf–Gitane professional team from the following year. Fignon joined the team in 1982, along with longtime friend and fellow junior rider Pascal Jules. Fignon was 21 years of age.

== Professional career ==
=== 1982: first professional season ===
In 1982, Fignon rode the 1982 Giro d'Italia. After Fignon broke away in the second stage, he became the leader of the race and got to wear the pink jersey. He lost the lead in the next stage, but became Hinault's most trusted teammate in the mountains. In Paris–Tours, Fignon had escaped and made a break of 40 seconds, when his crank broke. During this first year as a professional, Fignon won the Critérium International.

=== 1983: first Tour victory ===
In 1983, Fignon was a part of the team that helped Bernard Hinault to win the 1983 Vuelta a España. Guimard did not want to send Fignon to the Tour de France, because two grand tours could be too much for a 22-year-old rider. When Hinault, winner of four of the five previous Tours, announced that he would not start due to injury, the Renault team was without a leader. Fignon was added to the 1983 Tour de France selection for the Renault team, and the team decided to go for stage wins, with hopes of having Fignon or Marc Madiot compete for the best debutant category. After stage nine, the first mountain stage, Fignon was in second place, behind Pascal Simon, and he was allowed to be team leader. On the tenth stage, Simon crashed and broke his shoulder blade. Simon continued and only lost a little time on the next stages. On the fifteenth stage, a mountain time trial, Fignon was able to win back so much time that he was within one minute of Simon. On the seventeenth stage, Simon had to give up, and Fignon became the new leader. In the next stages, Fignon was able to answer all attacks from his opponents, and he won the time trial on the 21st stage. At 22 years old, Fignon was the youngest man to win the Tour since 1933.

Fignon later said that he was lucky to have won the 1983 Tour: if Hinault had been present, Fignon would have helped him, as Hinault was the team leader.

With his round glasses and sophisticated, urbane ("debonaire") demeanour, Fignon was a contrast to Hinault's hard-knocks image. He earned the nickname "The Professor", not only because of these glasses, but also because he was one of the few cyclists who had passed his baccalaureate exams.

Early in his broadcasting career, broadcaster and former TDF rider Paul Sherwen referred to Fignon with an alternate version of his nickname during telecasts, which in English approximately translates to 'The Stern Professor'.

=== 1984: second Tour victory ===
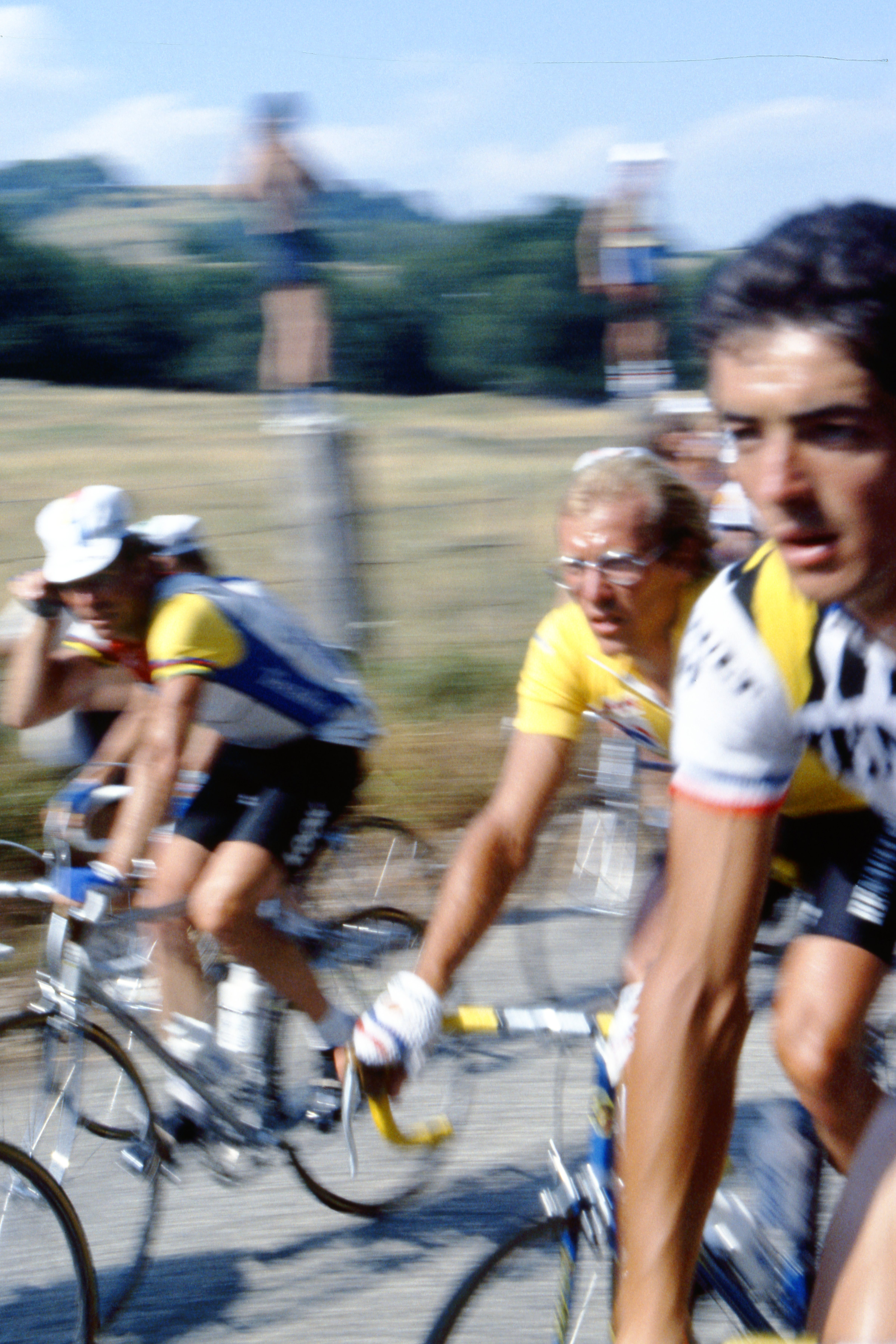
Laurent Fignon (center, with yellow jersey) during the Tour de France of 1984

In 1984, Hinault moved to the new La Vie Claire team, established by the French entrepreneur Bernard Tapie and directed by Swiss coach Paul Koechli. Fignon stayed with the Renault team and became team leader. In the 1984 Giro d'Italia, Fignon was in the lead near the end of the race, with Italian Francesco Moser in second place. The highest mountain stage, where Fignon could have extended his lead as the better climber, was cancelled by race organizers "due to bad weather". In one of the more outrageous actions of a major tour, on the final stage, an individual time trial, camera helicopters flew in front of Fignon, creating a headwind, and behind Moser, creating a tailwind. Though Fignon repeatedly shook his fists at the obstructing aircraft, they refused to move off. Moser ended up gaining enough time to take the overall race lead, with Fignon being moved back to second place. He later said the experience made him tougher and prepared him for the hardships to come.

The 1984 Tour de France was a battle between Fignon and his former team leader Hinault. Hinault won the prologue, but Fignon won back time when his team won the team time trial in stage three. After a large escape in the fifth stage, Fignon's teammate Vincent Barteau was leading the race. In the seventh stage, Fignon won the time trial, beating Hinault by 49 seconds. Barteau was still leading the race and remained the leader after the Pyrenées.

In the sixteenth stage, Fignon again beat Hinault in a time trial, this time winning by 33 seconds. In the seventeenth stage, Hinault attacked five times on the penultimate climb, but every time, Fignon was able to get back. Then, Fignon left Hinault behind and won almost three more minutes on Hinault. Barteau was so far behind in this stage that Fignon became the new leader. Fignon won three more stages, for a total of five that year, and won the Tour with a ten-minute margin.

=== 1985 and 1986: injury years ===
Coming into the 1985 season, Fignon felt stronger than ever, but two achilles tendon operations caused him to miss the 1985 Tour. The following season, his team took on a new sponsor and became the Système U cycling team. In 1986, Fignon won La Flèche Wallonne and he entered the 1986 Tour de France, but placed poorly in the first individual time trial and retired on stage 12 to Pau.

=== 1987 and 1988: return to the top ===
Fignon returned to near his full strength in 1987, when he finished third in the 1987 Vuelta a España, behind Luis Herrera. Later that year, he finished 7th overall in the 1987 Tour de France, taking another victory at La Plagne (stage 21). In 1988, Fignon won Milan–San Remo, but had to abandon the 1988 Tour.

=== 1989: losing by eight seconds ===
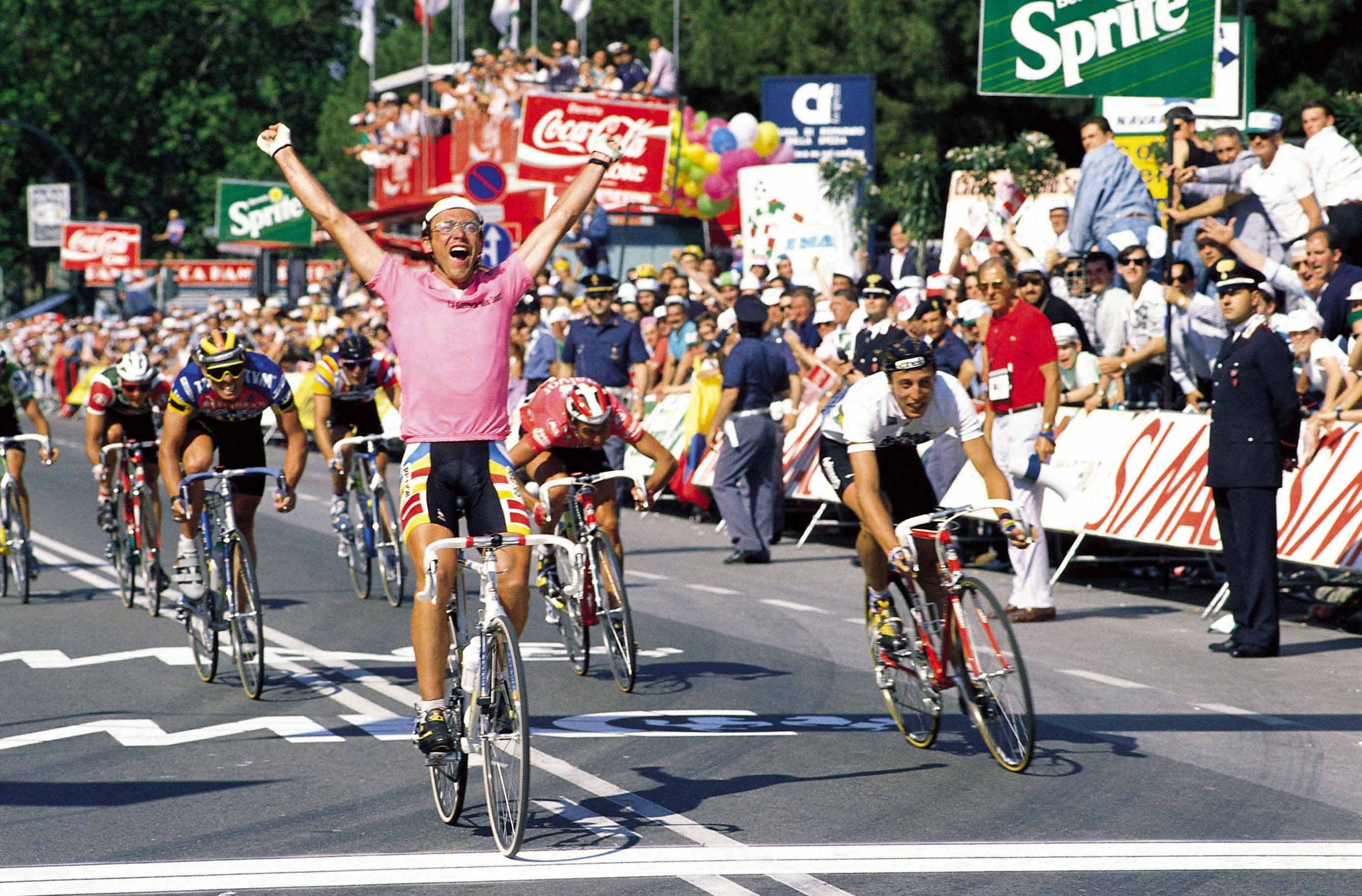
Laurent Fignon outsprints Maurizio Fondriest for the win, Stage 20 of the 1989 Giro d'Italia

In 1989, Fignon overtook Sean Kelly as leader of the UCI Road World Rankings. That season included a win at Milan–San Remo and the Giro d'Italia. During the Giro he defeated Flavio Giupponi, Erik Breukink and defending champion Andrew Hampsten. Fignon seized the Maglia Rosa on stage 14 and held it for the remainder of the race; he also won stage 20.

In the 1989 Tour de France, 1988 winner Pedro Delgado was the big favourite, with Fignon, Stephen Roche, and Erik Breukink listed together as top contenders. After Delgado was nearly three minutes late for the start of the prologue time trial, the race ended up a battle between Greg LeMond and Fignon. LeMond won a minute in the time trial in stage five, using aerobars which enabled a new and more aerodynamic riding position (also known as tri-bars as they had previously only been used in triathlons), a new type of teardrop-shaped aerodynamic helmet in the time trials and a rear disc wheel, Fignon used normal road handlebars and a bicycle with both front and rear disc wheels, which left him more affected by cross winds. LeMond led the general classification after that stage by five seconds. In the tenth stage, Fignon beat LeMond by 12 seconds and became the new leader, 7 seconds ahead of LeMond. In the time trial of stage 15, LeMond again won time on Fignon, and took back the leading position. Fignon came back by dropping LeMond on Alpe d'Huez, taking back the lead, and after he won alone at Villard-de-Lans the next day, the margin was 50 seconds. Before the final stage, a short time trial of 24.5 km, the time difference between LeMond and Fignon was 50 seconds, a seemingly insurmountable amount. To win, LeMond would have to take two seconds a kilometre on one of the fastest time trialists in the Tour. French newspapers prepared special editions, with Fignon's picture on the front page, in preparation for his victory. It was considered unlikely that LeMond would be able to win back 50 seconds on the 24.5 km, but he rode the fastest time trial until 2015. Fignon had developed epididymitis in stage 19, which gave him pain and made it impossible to sleep the night before the time trial. Fignon, who rode after LeMond, lost 58 seconds during the stage. Fignon rode a very fast time trial and came in third for the stage, but still ended up losing the overall lead to LeMond. It was suggested afterwards that if Fignon had cut off his ponytail, the reduction in drag might have been sufficient for him to have won the Tour.

During that Tour, he was on bad terms with the journalists. He often refused to smile for photographs, and at one point spat into the lens of a cameraman who asked for an interview. For his efforts, the press awarded Fignon the "Prix Citron" ("Lemon Prize"), a prize the press awarded to whom they thought the least likeable rider. The loss of the 1989 Tour was a heavy burden for Fignon, and in his autobiography he said "you never stop grieving over an event like that".

He came back after the Tour de France that year to win decidedly the Grand Prix des Nations time trial, an event that was considered at the time to be the world championships of time trials. This time, he used aero handlebar extensions. He also showed his versatility, winning the Polynormande, Critérium des As (a race in which each rider motorpaces behind a derny), and the two-man Trofeo Baracchi (which he won with teammate and fellow Frenchman Thierry Marie).

=== 1990–1993: later years ===
Fignon withdrew from the 1990 Tour, but finished 6th in 1991. Following this Fignon moved over to the Italian Gatorade team to act as co-captain and advisor to promising young talent Gianni Bugno. After a dramatic 1992 Giro d'Italia, in which he was in heavy crisis during mountain stages, he rode his last Tour that same year, finishing 23rd overall. The race saw an angered Fignon take his ninth stage win, holding off a series of attacks by Guimard's Castorama team before winning at Mulhouse during stage 11. (Note: Fignon had discussed with the team prior to the day's stage that they would attack as a group, but when his teammates refused to do so Fignon set off on his own.) Fignon's last victory as professional cyclist was in the early-season Ruta Mexico in 1993, after a tight duel with Francisco Villalobos and surviving a massive collision that saw the group hit by a tow truck driven by a drunken man. Fignon retired as a professional cyclist late 1993.

== Doping ==
Fignon tested positive for amphetamines at the Grand Prix de Wallonie in 1987, where he finished third. He was subsequently disqualified from the final result but claimed, in his autobiography, that the positive test was the result of a commercial dispute between two Belgian companies.

Fignon tested positive for amphetamines a second time, at the Grand Prix de la Liberation, on 17 September 1989.

In his autobiography, Fignon admitted to using recreational drugs and occasionally using stimulants in the 1980s. He noted this was widespread and that the practice would not dramatically change the capabilities of a rider. He noted major changes in the sport in the early 1990s with the onset of routine use of human growth hormone and the blood booster EPO. Fignon stated he was revolted by the idea of taking hormones to enhance performance, and the mere suggestion he refused out of hand. He retired from competition in 1993 when he realized that cycling had changed, and that he no longer had a place in it.

== After retirement ==
In 1995, Fignon founded the "Laurent Fignon organisation", to organize races, notably Paris–Nice, from 2000 until it was taken over by Amaury Sport Organisation (ASO), the organiser of Tour de France, in 2002. Fignon remained an organiser for races such as Paris–Corrèze.

In response to assertions that French riders were less successful over recent years due to the tight doping controls that French riders are subject to, Fignon responded frankly: "The sports directors don't do a good job any more. They lack competence and don't have authority over their riders. The non-results of French teams are not only the consequences of doping."

On his relationships with Cyrille Guimard and Bernard Hinault, Fignon said that with Bernard Hinault, Guimard already found a champion, whereas with himself, Guimard made him a champion. Therefore, his bond with Guimard was stronger than Hinault's bond with Guimard.

Fignon wrote an autobiography entitled Nous étions jeunes et insouciants ("We were young and carefree"), which was released in June 2009.

== Death ==
In June 2009, Fignon revealed that he was undergoing chemotherapy for metastatic cancer. He noted that early in his career he had dabbled with recreational drugs, amphetamines and cortisone, but did not believe they played a role in his illness. Amphetamine use during the criterium portion (late summer/early fall) of the cycling season was commonplace in the seventies and eighties. Fignon's cancer was diagnosed in April 2009 after metastatic tumors were found in his digestive system. In January 2010, his doctors discovered that the cancer had originated in his lungs. Fignon died at Pitié-Salpêtrière Hospital on 31 August 2010, at 12:30 pm. He was 50 years old.

His funeral took place on 3 September 2010 at Père Lachaise Cemetery, Paris, where he was later cremated.

Former fellow champion Greg LeMond said:

"It's a really sad day. He had a very, very big talent, much more than anyone recognised. We were teammates, competitors, but also friends. He was a great person, one of the few that I find was really true to himself. He was one of the few riders who I really admired for his honesty and his frankness. We talked about a lot of different things outside of cycling and I was fortunate to really get to know him when my career stopped. I believe he was also one of the generation that was cut short in the early nineties because he was not able to fulfill the rest of his career. But he was a great rider."

His ashes were placed in the columbarium of the Père Lachaise cemetery.

== Major results ==
1981
1st Stage 2 Tour du Vaucluse
1982
1st Overall Critérium International
1st Garancières-en-Beauce
1st Grand Prix de Cannes
Giro d'Italia

1st Prologue (TTT)
Held after Stage 2

2nd Overall Tour du Vaucluse

1st Stage 1

3rd Overall Étoile des Espoirs
8th GP de Bessèges
1983
1st Overall Tour de France

1st Young rider classification
1st Combination classification
1st Stage 21 (ITT)

1st Grand Prix de Plumelec
1st Circuit de l'Aulne
1st Maël-Pestivien
1st Stage 1 Critérium International
1st Stage 3 Tour du Limousin
1st Prologue Tour d'Armorique
3rd Polynormande
4th Critérium des As
7th Overall Vuelta a España

1st Stage 4

7th Overall Tirreno–Adriatico

1st Stage 4

9th Trofeo Baracchi (with Marc Madiot)
1984
1st Road race, National Road Championships
1st Overall Tour de France

1st Combination classification
1st Stages 3 (TTT), 7 (ITT), 16 (ITT), 18, 20 & 22 (ITT)

1st Stage 9 Clásico RCN
2nd Overall Giro d'Italia

1st Mountains classification
1st Stages 1 (TTT) & 20
Held after Stages 1–4, 20 & 21

2nd Trophée des Grimpeurs
3rd Grand Prix de Fourmies
4th Circuit de l'Aulne
4th Grand Prix des Nations
7th Overall Tour de Romandie

1st Points classification
1st Prologue & Stage 4

8th Liège–Bastogne–Liège
1985
1st Overall Settimana Internazionale di Coppi e Bartali

1st Stage 4a

1st Prologue Étoile de Bessèges
2nd Overall Tour Midi-Pyrénées

1st Prologue

3rd La Flèche Wallonne
3rd Brabantse Pijl
5th Liège–Bastogne–Liège
8th GP de Bessèges
1986
1st La Flèche Wallonne
1st Bol d'Or des Monédières
1st Stage 2 Critérium du Dauphiné Libéré
1st Stage 2 (TTT) Tour de France
2nd Overall Tour du Vaucluse
2nd Overall Escalada a Montjuich
2nd Paris–Camembert
2nd Grand Prix des Nations
6th Overall Tour de l'Aude
7th Overall Vuelta a España
7th Overall Three Days of De Panne
8th Overall Tour Méditerranéen
10th Grand Prix Eddy Merckx
1987
1st Stage 6 Ronde van Nederland
2nd Overall Tour de Luxembourg

1st Stage 3a (ITT)

2nd Overall Étoile de Bessèges
3rd Overall Vuelta a España

1st Combination classification
1st Stage 19

3rd Overall Paris–Nice

1st Stages 5 & 7a

3rd Overall Tour du Vaucluse
3rd Grand Prix de Wallonie
3rd Circuit de l'Aulne
5th Overall Critérium International
6th Overall Volta a Catalunya
6th Liège–Bastogne–Liège
7th Overall Tour de France

1st Stage 21

1988
1st Overall Tour de la Communauté Européenne

1st Stage 9

1st Milan–San Remo
1st Paris–Camembert
2nd Overall Critérium International

1st Stage 2

2nd Paris–Brussels
2nd Grand Prix de Wallonie
2nd Grand Prix des Nations
3rd Paris–Roubaix
4th Overall Route du Sud

1st Prologue & Stage 1

5th Overall Paris–Nice
5th Overall Settimana Internazionale di Coppi e Bartali
6th Overall Étoile de Bessèges
8th Road race, UCI Road World Championships
9th Overall Ronde van Nederland
1989
1st UCI World Ranking
1st Overall Giro d'Italia

1st Stage 20

1st Overall Ronde van Nederland
1st Milan–San Remo
1st Polynormande
1st Critérium des As
1st Grand Prix des Nations
1st Trofeo Baracchi (with Thierry Marie)
1st Baden-Baden (with Thierry Marie)
2nd Overall Tour de France

1st Stages 2 (TTT) & 18
Held after Stages 10–14 & 17–20
Combativity award Overall

2nd Grand Prix de la Libération
3rd Circuit de l'Aulne
4th Overall Tour de Romandie
5th Grand Prix de Wallonie
6th Overall Critérium International
6th Overall Tour Méditerranéen
6th Road race, UCI Road World Championships
7th Liège–Bastogne–Liège
7th Tour du Haut Var
1990
1st Overall Critérium International
3rd Critérium des As
4th Overall Paris–Nice
8th Overall Route du Sud
1991
1st Stage 5 Giro di Puglia
6th Overall Tour de France
10th Overall Paris–Nice
1992
1st Stage 11 Tour de France
4th Road race, National Road Championships
4th Baden-Baden (with Gianni Bugno)
6th Grand Prix Eddy Merckx
8th Overall Euskal Bizikleta
8th Overall Tour DuPont
9th Giro del Veneto
10th Trofeo Melinda
1993
1st Overall Ruta Mexico

1st Stage 6

=== Grand Tours general classification results timeline ===
Grand Tour	1982	1983	1984	1985	1986	1987	1988	1989	1990	1991	1992	1993
Vuelta a España	—	7	—	—	7	3	—	—	—	—	—	—
Giro d'Italia	15	—	2	—	—	—	—	1	DNF	DNF	37	—
Tour de France	—	1	1	—	DNF	7	DNF	2	DNF	6	23	DNF

=== Classics results timeline ===
Monuments results timeline
Monument	1982	1983	1984	1985	1986	1987	1988	1989	1990	1991	1992	1993
Milan–San Remo	—	118	—	—	32	—	1	1	—	52	63	—
Tour of Flanders	—	—	—	—	34	—	13	—	—	—	77	—
Paris–Roubaix	—	—	—	—	—	—	3	—	27	24	39	—
Liège–Bastogne–Liège	—	—	8	5	—	6	—	7	—	—	—	—
Giro di Lombardia	21	29	—	—	—	—	—	25	—	—	—	—

=== Major championship results timeline ===
	1982	1983	1984	1985	1986	1987	1988	1989	1990	1991	1992	1993
World Championships	DNF	29	DNF	—	62	DNF	8	6	—	16	40	—
National Championships	—	—	1	—	—	—	—	—	—	20	4	—

Legend
—	Did not compete
DNF	Did not finish
