= Moreno Argentin =

Italian cyclist

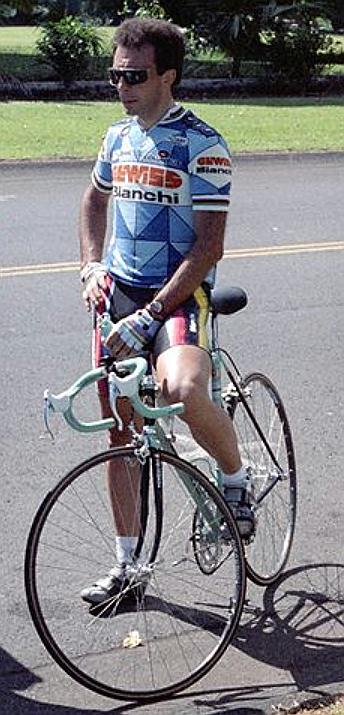
- Argentin in 1987

Personal information
- Full name: Moreno Argentin
- Nickname: Il Capo
- Born: 17 December 1960 (age 65) San Donà di Piave, Italy
- Height: 1.75 m (5 ft 9 in)
- Weight: 66 kg (146 lb)

Cycling career
- Sport: Cycling
- Discipline: Road
- Role: Rider

Professional teams
- 1981–1984: Sammontana
- 1985–1986: Sammontana–Bianchi
- 1987–1989: Gewiss–Bianchi
- 1990–1992: Ariostea
- 1993: Mecair-Ballan
- 1994: Gewiss–Ballan

Major wins
- Grand Tours Tour de France 2 individual stage (1990, 1991) 1 TTT (1991) Giro d'Italia 13 individual stages (1981–1994) Stage Races Danmark Rundt (1985) Giro del Trentino (1994) One-Day Races and Classics World Road Race Championship (1986) National Road Race Championship (1983, 1989) Liège–Bastogne–Liège (1985, 1986, 1987, 1991) Giro di Lombardia (1987) Tour of Flanders (1990) La Flèche Wallonne (1990, 1991, 1994)
Medal record
Representing Italy
Men's road bicycle racing
World Championships
Gold medal – first place	1986 Colorado Springs	Elite Men's Road Race
Silver medal – second place	1987 Villach	Elite Men's Road Race
Bronze medal – third place	1985 Giavera di Montello	Elite Men's Road Race

Moreno Argentin (born 17 December 1960) is an Italian former professional cyclist (from 1981 to 1994) and race director.

Born in San Donà di Piave (Veneto), Argentin won stages in the Tour de France, the Giro d'Italia, and the Tour de Suisse. Known as Il Capo ("The Boss"), he won Liège–Bastogne–Liège four times, the La Flèche Wallonne three times, and the Tour of Flanders and Giro di Lombardia once. He became Italian national champion in 1983 and 1989, and world champion in 1986.

Argentin cofounded the Adriatica Ionica Race, first run in 2018.

== Career achievements ==
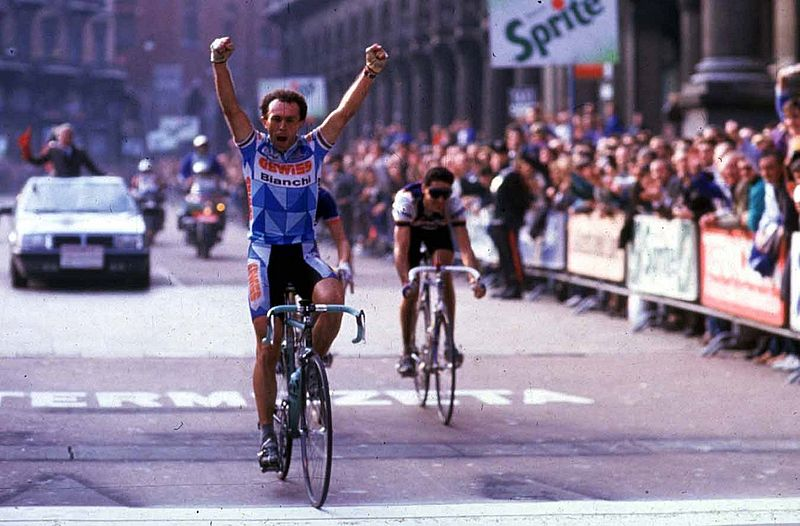
Argentin winning the 1987 Giro di Lombardia

=== Major results ===
1977
1st National Junior Track Championships (Team Pursuit)

1978
1st National Junior Track Championships (Team Pursuit)
1st National Junior Road Championships, Team Time Trial

1979
1st National Amateur Track Championships (Team Pursuit)
1st Piccolo Giro di Lombardia
1st Prologue & Stage 4 Giro della Valle d'Aosta
1st Team classification Ster van het Zuiden
2nd Overall Flèche du Sud
4th Trofeo Zssdi - Un. Circ. Sloveni in Italia

1980
1st National Amateur Track Championships (Team Pursuit)
1st National Military Road Championships, Road Race
1st Giro Valli Aretine
1st Coppa Caduti - Puglia di Arezzo
1st Grand Prix Agostano
1st Stage 3 Girobio
1st Prologue Giro della Valle d'Aosta
6th National Amateur Road Championships, Road Race

1981
1st GP Industria e Commercio di Prato
1st Stages 12 & 18 Giro d'Italia
2nd Giro di Lombardia
2nd Arma di Taggia
2nd Rho (Lombardia)
3rd Col San Martino

1982
1st Trofeo Matteotti
1st GP Industria e Commercio di Prato
1st Giro della Romagna
1st Treviso
1st Stage 9 Giro d'Italia
1st Stage 3 Tour de Suisse
2nd Arma di Taggia
2nd Granze
2nd Roccastrada
3rd Milan–San Remo
3rd Napoli–Pianura
3rd Chignolo Po Criterium

1983
1st National Road Championships, Road Race
1st Coppa Sabatini
1st Livorno
1st Mussolente
1st San Donà di Piave
1st San Vendemiano
1st Stages 7 & 21 Giro d'Italia
1st Stages 2 & 3 Tirreno–Adriatico
1st Stage 3 Giro di Sardegna
2nd GP Montelup
2nd Six Days of Milan
2nd Cecina
3rd Trofeo Matteotti
3rd Circuito degli Assi - Nanno

1984
1st Overall Settimana Siciliana

1st Stage 2

1st Giro del Veneto
1st Quarrata
1st San Donà di Piave
1st Stage 4 Giro di Puglia
1st Stage 3 Ruota d'Oro
2nd Florence
2nd Col San Martino
3rd Overall Giro d'Italia

1st Stages 3 & 5

1985
1st Overall Tour of Denmark
1st Liège–Bastogne–Liège
1st San Vendemiano
1st Scordia
1st Cronostaffetta
1st Stage 1 Tirreno–Adriatico
1st Prologue Tour de Romandie
2nd La Flèche Wallonne
2nd Coppa Bernocchi
2nd Paris–Tours
2nd Giro di Campania
2nd Circuito degli Assi - Nanno
3rd UCI Road World Championships
5th Pernod–Super Prestige
8th FICP Ranking
10th Overall Settimana Siciliana

1986
1st UCI Road World Championships
1st Liège–Bastogne–Liège
1st Trofeo Francesco Civettini
1st Curno
2nd Overall Settimana Siciliana

1st Stage 2

2nd GP Industria e Commercio di Prato
3rd Giro della Provincia di Reggio Calabria
4th Eschborn–Frankfurt City Loop
7th Overall Coors Classic

1st Stage 9

8th FICP Ranking

1987
1st Liège–Bastogne–Liège
1st Giro di Lombardia
1st Bacoli
1st Six Days of Bassano del Grappa
1st San Martino di Castrozza
1st G.P. Banca di Credito Cooperativo dell'Alta Padovana
1st Grazer Altstadt Kriterium
1st Stages 2, 4 & 7 Giro d'Italia
1st Stage 3 Settimana Siciliana
1st Stage 1 Vuelta a Andalucía
1st Stages 2 & 4 Tirreno–Adriatico
1st Stage 16 Coors Classic
2nd UCI Road World Championships
2nd Giro dell'Emilia
3rd Km del Corso Mestre
3rd San Donà di Piave
4th FICP Ranking
6th Trofeo Baracchi
7th Paris–Tours
8th Pernod–Super Prestige
10th La Flèche Wallonne

1988
1st Giro del Veneto
1st Giro della Provincia di Reggio Calabria
1st Biban de Carbonera
1st Stage 1 Critérium International
2nd La Flèche Wallonne
2nd GP Industria e Commercio di Prato
3rd Nittedal–Oslo

1989
1st National Road Championships, Road Race
1st Stage 5 Settimana Siciliana
1st Stage 4 Bicicleta Vasca
3rd Biban de Carbonera

1990
1st Tour of Flanders
1st La Flèche Wallonne
1st Coppa Sabatini
1st Stage 3 Tour de France
1st Stage 9 Tour de Suisse
4th Milan–San Remo
6th Liège–Bastogne–Liège

1991
1st Liège–Bastogne–Liège
1st La Flèche Wallonne
1st Sanson
1st Trittico Premondiale
1st Stages 2 (TTT) & 15 Tour de France
2nd San Sebastián Criterium
6th Coppa Bernocchi
10th Giro dell'Appennino
10th Circuito degli Assi - Nanno

1992
1st Overall Settimana Siciliana

1st Stages 4 & 6

1st Stages 5, 6 & 7 Tirreno–Adriatico
1st Warsaw
2nd Milan–San Remo

1993
1st Stage 6 Tour Méditerranéen
3rd Giro del Friuli
5th Liège–Bastogne–Liège
6th Overall Giro d'Italia

1st Stages 1a & 13

1994
1st Overall Giro del Trentino

1st Stage 2

1st La Flèche Wallonne
1st Stage 2 Giro d'Italia

=== Monuments results timeline ===
Monument	1981	1982	1983	1984	1985	1986	1987	1988	1989	1990	1991	1992	1993	1994
Milan–San Remo	—	3	28	17	26	—	—	—	41	4	—	2	—	—
Tour of Flanders	—	—	—	—	—	—	15	66	—	1	53	—	42	—
Paris–Roubaix	Did not contest during career													
Liège–Bastogne–Liège	—	39	—	—	1	1	1	12	—	6	1	—	5	18
Giro di Lombardia	2	—	21	—	30	—	1	—	—	—	—	—	—	—

Legend
—	Did not compete
DNF	Did not finish
