= Claude Criquielion =

Belgian cyclist

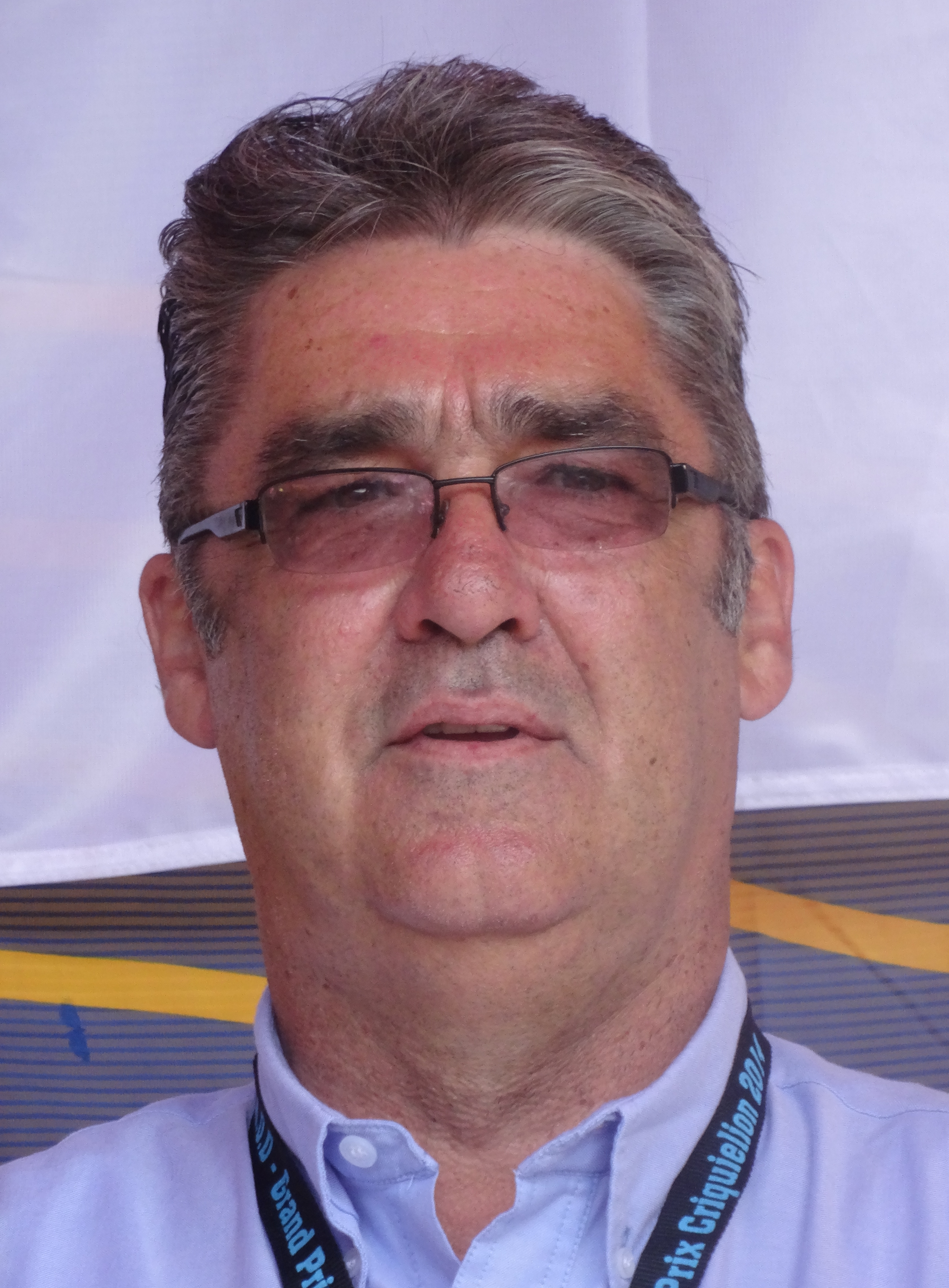
- Criquielion in 2014

Personal information
- Full name: Claude Criquielion
- Born: 11 January 1957 Lessines, Belgium
- Died: 18 February 2015 (aged 58) Aalst, Belgium

Cycling career
- Sport: Cycling
- Current team: Retired
- Discipline: Road
- Role: Rider

Professional teams
- 1979: Kas–Campagnolo
- 1980–1989: Splendor
- 1990–1991: Lotto–Superclub

Managerial teams
- 2000–2004: Lotto–Adecco
- 2005–2006: Landbouwkrediet–Colnago

Major wins
- Stage races Tour de Romandie (1986) One-day races and Classics World Road Race Championships (1984) National Road Race Championships (1990) La Flèche Wallonne (1985, 1989) Tour of Flanders (1987) Clásica de San Sebastián (1983)
Medal record
Representing Belgium
Men's road bicycle racing
World Championships
Gold medal – first place	1984 Barcelona	Elite Men's Road Race

Claude Criquielion (11 January 1957 – 18 February 2015) was a Belgian professional road bicycle racer who raced between 1979 and 1990. In 1984, Criquielion became the world road race champion in Barcelona, Spain on a gruelling course. He had five top-ten finishes in the Tour de France.

Criquielion was well placed to win a medal in the 1988 world road race championship in Belgium. However, he crashed in sight of the line when another competitor, Steve Bauer of Canada, pushed him into the safety barriers and was disqualified for this reason. The third rider, Maurizio Fondriest, went on to win. Bauer was disqualified and Criquielion sued Bauer for assault, asking for $1.5 million in damages in a case that lasted more than three years before the judge unexpectedly ruled in Bauer's favor.

At the national championship race in 1985, he tested positive for Pervitin, but received no repercussions. The head of the laboratory at Ghent University, which had administered the analysis, subsequently resigned his post in the Medical Commission of the Belgian Cycling Association (KBWB) in protest.

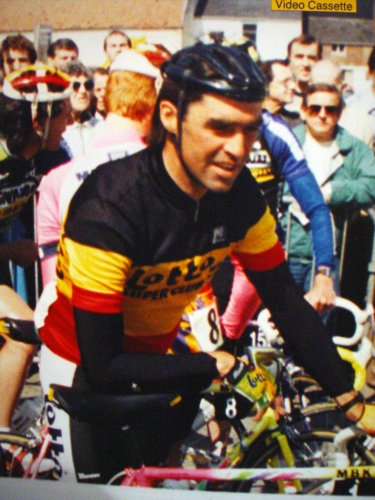
Criquielion at the 1990 GP de Wallonie

Criquielion was directeur sportif of the Lotto–Adecco team from 2000 to 2004. His son, Mathieu Criquielion, turned professional for the Landbouwkrediet-Colnago team in 2005; Claude Criquielion became the team's manager.

From 2006 until his death Criquielion was an alderman for the liberal MR in Lessines.

During the night of 15–16 February 2015, Criquielion suffered a cerebrovascular accident and he was hospitalized in critical condition. Criquelion died at 9:00 AM on 18 February 2015 in a hospital in Aalst.

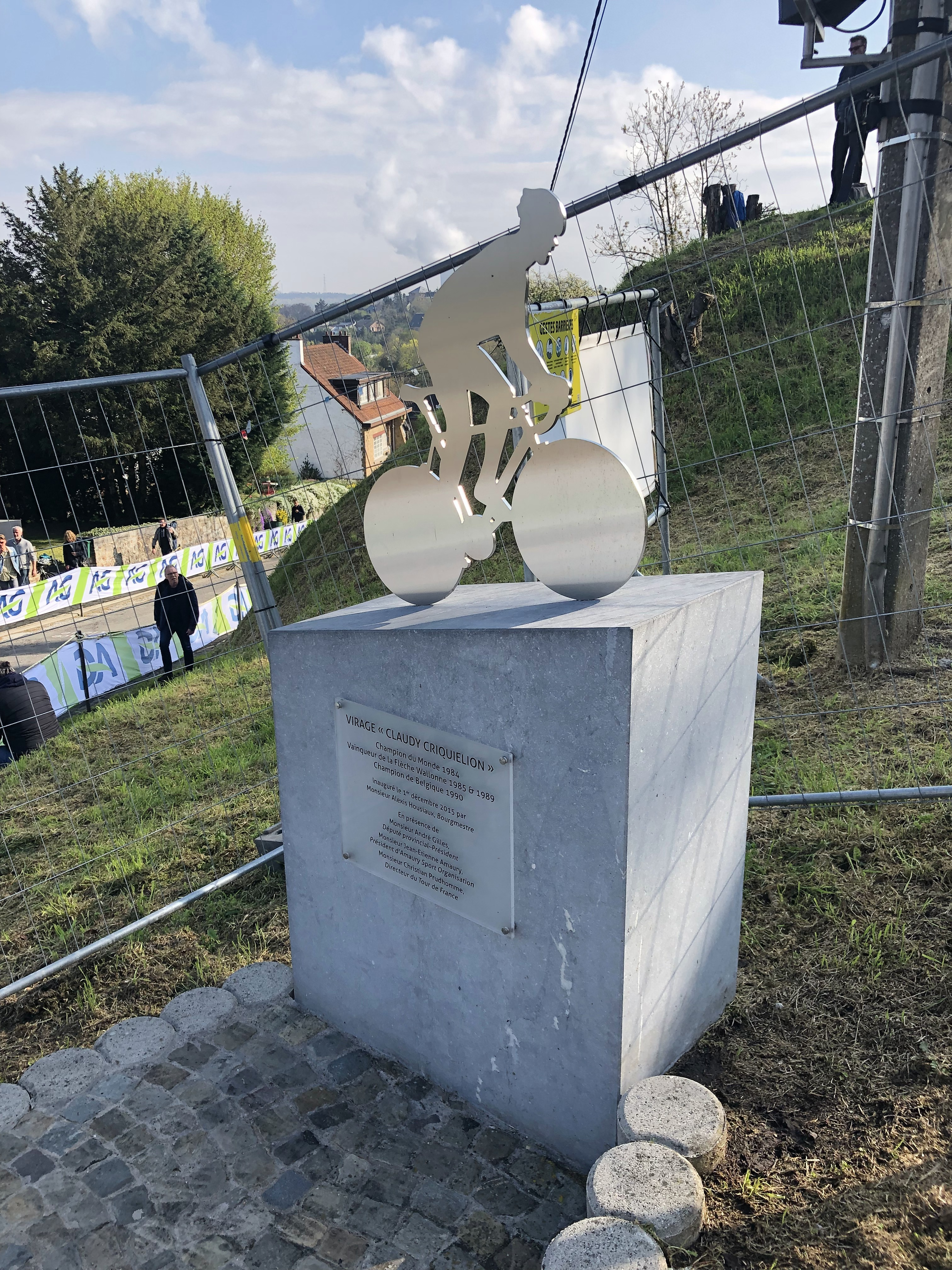
Claude Criquielion monument

Claude Criquielion monument is at Mur de Huy on the route of La Flèche Wallonne in Huy, Belgium.

Since 1991 the Grand Prix Criquielion in organized in his honour.

== Career achievements ==
=== Major results ===
1979
1st Escalada a Montjuïc
1st Setmana Catalana de Ciclisme
1st Escalada a Montjuïc
9th Overall Tour de France
1980
Tirreno–Adriatico

1st Stage 4

Critérium du Dauphiné Libéré

1st Stage 3b

3rd Overall Vuelta a España
1981
9th Overall Tour de France
1982
1st Brabantse Pijl
4th Liège–Bastogne–Liège
5th Overall Paris–Nice
9th Giro di Lombardia
1983
1st Clásica de San Sebastián
8th Tour du Haut Var
1984
1st Road race, UCI Road World Championships
1st Grand Prix Eddy Merckx
1st Escalada a Montjuïc
Tour de Luxembourg

1st Stage 1

1st Escalada a Montjuïc
2nd Grand Prix de Wallonie
3rd Critérium des As
7th Liège–Bastogne–Liège
7th Giro di Lombardia
9th Overall Tour de France
1985
1st La Flèche Wallonne
1st Polynormande
2nd Road race
2nd Liège–Bastogne–Liège
2nd Kampioenschap van Vlaanderen
3rd Grand Prix de Wallonie
3rd Critérium des As
6th Tour of Flanders
8th Amstel Gold Race
1986
1st Overall Tour de Romandie

1st Mountains classification
1st Combined classification

1st Overall Midi Libre
1st Grand Prix du Midi Libre

1st Stage 2 and 4
Points classification

3rd La Flèche Wallonne
3rd Super Prestige Pernod
4th Liège–Bastogne–Liège
5th Overall Tour de France
8th Tour of Flanders
9th Amstel Gold Race
1987
1st Grand Prix José Samyn
1st Tour of Flanders
1st GP de Fayt-le-Franc
Tour de Luxembourg

1st Stage 4

2nd La Flèche Wallonne
3rd Liège–Bastogne–Liège
3rd Super Prestige Pernod
7th Giro di Lombardia
10th Overall Paris–Nice
1988
1st Critérium des As
1st Grand Prix de Wallonie
1st GP de Purnode
1st Grand Prix du Midi Libre

1st Stage 2

2nd Tour du Vaucluse
3rd Amstel Gold Race
5th Gent–Wevelgem
8th Züri–Metzgete
1989
1st La Flèche Wallonne
1st GP Michel Goffin à Huppaye
2nd Amstel Gold Race
5th E3 Prijs Vlaanderen
7th Overall Giro d'Italia
1990
1st Road race, National Road Championships
2nd Tour du Haut Var
8th Tour of Flanders
6th Giro di Lombardia
9th Overall Tour de France
1991
2nd Liège–Bastogne–Liège
2nd La Flèche Wallonne
7th Overall Paris–Nice

=== Grand Tour general classification results timeline ===
Grand Tour	1979	1980	1981	1982	1983	1984	1985	1986	1987	1988	1989	1990
Vuelta a España	—	3	—	DNF	—	—	—	—	—	—	—	—
Giro d'Italia	—	—	—	—	—	—	—	—	—	—	7	—
Tour de France	9	13	9	DNF	18	9	18	5	11	14	36	9
