= 1977 E3 Prijs Vlaanderen =

1977 E3 Harelbeke
Race details
- Dates: 26 March 1977
- Stages: 1
- Distance: 233 km (145 mi)
- Winning time: 5h 46' 00"

Results
	Winner	Dietrich Thurau (FRG)
	Second	Patrick Sercu (BEL)
	Third	Erik De Vlaeminck (BEL)

The 1977 E3 Harelbeke was the 20th edition of the E3 Harelbeke cycle race and was held on 26 March 1977. The race started and finished in Harelbeke. The race was won by Dietrich Thurau.

== General classification ==
Final general classification

Rank	Rider	Time
1	Dietrich Thurau (FRG)	5h 46' 00"
2	Patrick Sercu (BEL)	+ 2' 08"
3	Erik De Vlaeminck (BEL)	+ 2' 08"
4	Walter Planckaert (BEL)	+ 2' 08"
5	Wilfried Wesemael (BEL)	+ 2' 08"
6	Luc Leman (BEL)	+ 2' 08"
7	Jan Raas (NED)	+ 2' 08"
8	Walter Naegels (BEL)	+ 2' 08"
9	Eric Leman (BEL)	+ 2' 08"
10	Willy Planckaert (BEL)	+ 2' 08"
