= 1978 Scheldeprijs =

Race details
- Dates: 1 August 1978
- Stages: 1
- Distance: 246 km (152.9 mi)
- Winning time: 5h 45' 00"

Results
	Winner	Dietrich Thurau (FRG)
	Second	Martin Havik (NED)
	Third	Aad van den Hoek (NED)

The 1978 Scheldeprijs was the 65th edition of the Scheldeprijs cycle race and was held on 1 August 1978. The race was won by Dietrich Thurau.

== General classification ==
Final general classification

Rank	Rider	Time
1	Dietrich Thurau (FRG)	5h 45' 00"
2	Martin Havik (NED)	+ 1' 25"
3	Aad van den Hoek (NED)	+ 1' 25"
4	René Mertens (BEL)	+ 1' 55"
5	Danny Ameloot (BEL)	+ 2' 10"
6	Alain De Roo (BEL)	+ 9' 10"
7	Gustaaf Van Roosbroeck (BEL)	+ 11' 00"
8	Ferdi Van Den Haute (BEL)	+ 11' 00"
9	Eric Van De Wiele (BEL)	+ 11' 00"
10	Ronny Bossant (BEL)	+ 11' 00"
