= 1979 UCI Road World Championships – Men's road race =

Men's Individual Road Race
1979 UCI Road World Championships
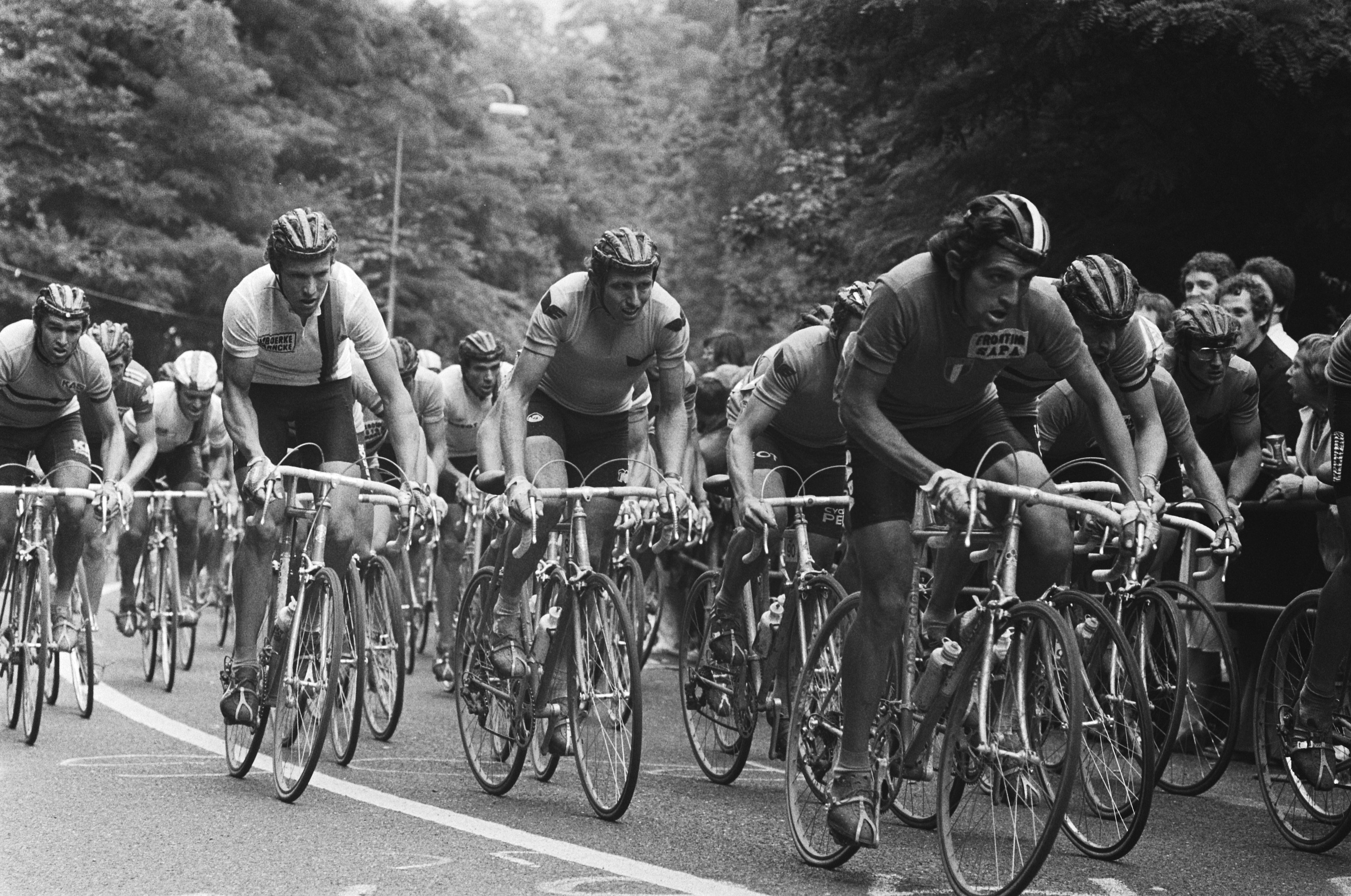
- The peloton during the race

Race details
- Dates: 26 August 1979
- Stages: 1
- Distance: 274.8 km (170.8 mi)
- Winning time: 7h 03' 09"

Results
	Winner	Jan Raas (NED)	(Netherlands)
	Second	Dietrich Thurau (FRG)	(West Germany)
	Third	Jean-René Bernaudeau (FRA)	(France)

The men's road race at the 1979 UCI Road World Championships was the 46th edition of the event. The race took place on Sunday 26 August 1979 in Valkenburg, the Netherlands. The race was won by Jan Raas of the Netherlands.

== Final classification ==
General classification (1–10)

Rank	Rider	Time
1st place, gold medalist(s)	Jan Raas (NED)	7h 03' 09"
2nd place, silver medalist(s)	Dietrich Thurau (FRG)	+ 0"
3rd place, bronze medalist(s)	Jean-René Bernaudeau (FRA)	+ 0"
4	André Chalmel (FRA)	+ 5"
5	Henk Lubberding (NED)	+ 12"
6	Giovanni Battaglin (ITA)	+ 23"
7	Knut Knudsen (NOR)	+ 52"
8	Giuseppe Saronni (ITA)	+ 4' 37"
9	Sean Kelly (IRL)	+ 4' 37"
10	Roger De Vlaeminck (BEL)	+ 4' 37"
