= Martin Havik =

Dutch bicycle racer and track cyclist (born 1955)

Personal information
- Born: 15 December 1955 (age 70) De Koog, Netherlands

Cycling career
- Sport: Cycling
- Current team: Retired
- Disciplines: Road; Track
- Role: Rider

Professional teams
- 1977: De Onderneming–Marvik
- 1978: Marc Zeepcentrale–Superia
- 1979: TI–Raleigh–McGregor
- 1980: HB Alarmsystemen
- 1981: Boule d'Or–Sunair
- 1982: Jeans Store–Greive Beck
- 1983: Beckers Snacks–Bicky Burger
- 1984: Gis Gelati–Tuc Lu
Medal record
Men's track cycling
Representing the Netherlands
World Championships
Bronze medal – third place	1983 Zurich	Motor-paced

Martin Havik (born 15 December 1955) is a Dutch former road and track cyclist. Professional from 1977 to 1984, he won a bronze medal at the 1983 UCI Motor-paced World Championships.

== Major results ==
1974
1st Road race, National Junior Road Championships
1976
3rd Overall Tour de Liège
1977
1st Omloop van de Braakman
1st Stage 1 Niedersachsen Rundfahrt
1978
2nd Scheldeprijs
3rd Omloop Mandel-Leie-Schelde
4th Road race, National Road Championships
1979
1st Stage 3 Four Days of Dunkirk
1st Kessel–Lierre
3rd Paris–Brussels
5th Grand Prix de Wallonie
7th GP de Fourmies
10th Dwars door België
1981
3rd Overall Vuelta a Andalucía

1st Stage 2

5th Grand Prix Cerami
1982
3rd Polder–Kempen
1983
4th Ronde van Limburg
10th Bordeaux–Paris
