= 1985 La Flèche Wallonne =

Race details
- Dates: 17 April 1985
- Stages: 1
- Distance: 246 km (152.9 mi)
- Winning time: 5h 39' 50"

Results
	Winner	Claude Criquielion (BEL)	(Hitachi–Splendor–Sunair)
	Second	Moreno Argentin (ITA)	(Sammontana–Bianchi)
	Third	Laurent Fignon (FRA)	(Renault–Elf)

The 1985 La Flèche Wallonne was the 49th edition of La Flèche Wallonne cycle race and was held on 17 April 1985. The race started and finished in Huy. The race was won by Claude Criquielion of the Hitachi team.

== General classification ==
Final general classification

Rank	Rider	Team	Time
1	Claude Criquielion (BEL)	Hitachi–Splendor–Sunair	5h 39' 50"
2	Moreno Argentin (ITA)	Sammontana–Bianchi	+ 1' 49"
3	Laurent Fignon (FRA)	Renault–Elf	+ 1' 59"
4	Acácio da Silva (POR)	Malvor–Bottecchia–Vaporella	+ 2' 16"
5	Yvon Madiot (FRA)	Renault–Elf	+ 3' 34"
6	Emanuele Bombini (ITA)	Del Tongo–Colnago	+ 3' 37"
7	Mario Beccia (ITA)	Malvor–Bottecchia–Vaporella	+ 3' 43"
8	Jörg Müller (SUI)	Skil–Sem–Kas–Miko	+ 3' 55"
9	Eric Van Lancker (BEL)	Fangio–Ecoturbo	+ 3' 59"
10	Pascal Poisson (FRA)	Renault–Elf	+ 4' 02"
