= 1984 Liège–Bastogne–Liège =

Race details
- Dates: 15 April 1984
- Stages: 1
- Distance: 246.7 km (153.3 mi)
- Winning time: 6h 47' 31"

Results
	Winner	Sean Kelly (IRL)	(Skil–Reydel–Sem–Mavic)
	Second	Phil Anderson (AUS)	(Panasonic–Raleigh)
	Third	Greg LeMond (USA)	(Renault–Elf)

The 1984 Liège–Bastogne–Liège was the 70th edition of the Liège–Bastogne–Liège cycle race and was held on 15 April 1984. The race started and finished in Liège. The race was won by Sean Kelly of the Skil team.

== General classification ==
Final general classification

Rank	Rider	Team	Time
1	Sean Kelly (IRL)	Skil–Reydel–Sem–Mavic	6h 47' 31"
2	Phil Anderson (AUS)	Panasonic–Raleigh	+ 0"
3	Greg LeMond (USA)	Renault–Elf	+ 0"
4	Steven Rooks (NED)	Panasonic–Raleigh	+ 0"
5	Acácio da Silva (POR)	Malvor–Bottecchia	+ 0"
6	Marc Madiot (FRA)	Renault–Elf	+ 0"
7	Claude Criquielion (BEL)	Splendor–Mondial Moquettes–Marc	+ 3"
8	Laurent Fignon (FRA)	Renault–Elf	+ 3"
9	Joop Zoetemelk (NED)	Kwantum–Decosol–Yoko	+ 3"
10	Pascal Jules (FRA)	Renault–Elf	+ 1' 42"
