= 1986 La Flèche Wallonne =

Race details
- Dates: 16 April 1986
- Stages: 1
- Distance: 248 km (154.1 mi)
- Winning time: 6h 24' 39"

Results
	Winner	Laurent Fignon (FRA)	(Système U)
	Second	Jean-Claude Leclercq (FRA)	(Kas)
	Third	Claude Criquielion (BEL)	(Hitachi–Marc)

The 1986 La Flèche Wallonne was the 50th edition of La Flèche Wallonne cycle race and was held on 16 April 1986. The race started in Spa and finished in Huy. The race was won by Laurent Fignon of the Système U team.

== General classification ==
Final general classification (Note: Kim Andersen arrived second at + 1' 34", but was disqualified for doping.)

Rank	Rider	Team	Time
1	Laurent Fignon (FRA)	Système U	6h 24' 39"
2	Jean-Claude Leclercq (FRA)	Kas	+ 3' 00"
3	Claude Criquielion (BEL)	Hitachi–Marc	+ 3' 07"
4	Greg LeMond (USA)	La Vie Claire	+ 3' 09"
5	Sean Kelly (IRL)	Kas	+ 3' 12"
6	Joop Zoetemelk (NED)	Kwantum–Decosol–Yoko	+ 3' 19"
7	Steven Rooks (NED)	PDM–Ultima–Concorde	+ 3' 20"
8	Rolf Gölz (FRG)	Del Tongo	+ 3' 21"
9	Johan van der Velde (NED)	Panasonic–Merckx–Agu	+ 3' 30"
10	Charly Mottet (FRA)	Système U	+ 3' 38"
