= 1988 UCI Road World Championships – Men's road race =

Men's Individual Road Race
1988 UCI Road World Championships
- Rainbow jersey

Race details
- Dates: 28 August 1988
- Stages: 1
- Winning time: 7h 02' 11"

Medalists
	Gold	Maurizio Fondriest (ITA)	(Italy)
	Silver	Martial Gayant (FRA)	(France)
	Bronze	Juan Fernández (ESP)	(Spain)

The 1988 UCI Road World Championships - Men's Road Race took place on 28 August 1988 in Ronse, Belgium.

There was a crash during the final sprint. The exact reason for the crash is debatable, but it involved Steve Bauer and Claude Criquielion. As Bauer approached the line in the lead, the second rider (Claude Criquielion) attempted to pass through on the right. Bauer protected the lead by boxing in Criquielion towards the barriers. Criquielion fell, then slid into Bauer and slowed him down, allowing Maurizio Fondriest to come around for the easy win, with Bauer second. Bauer was sued by Criquielion for assault, seeking damages of $1.5 million. Bauer won the lawsuit.

== Results ==
General classification (1–10)

Rank	Rider	Time
1st place, gold medalist(s)	Maurizio Fondriest (ITA)	7h 2' 11"
2nd place, silver medalist(s)	Martial Gayant (FRA)	+ 27"
3rd place, bronze medalist(s)	Juan Fernández (ESP)	+ 41"
4	Hartmut Bölts (GER)	+ 41"
5	Mauro Gianetti (SUI)	+ 41"
6	Ronan Pensec (FRA)	+ 41"
7	Davide Cassani (ITA)	+ 41"
8	Laurent Fignon (FRA)	+ 41"
9	Jaanus Kuum (NOR)	+ 46"
10	Allan Peiper (AUS)	+ 55"
