= 1991 La Flèche Wallonne =

Race details
- Dates: 17 April 1991
- Stages: 1
- Distance: 203 km (126 mi)
- Winning time: 5h 13' 14"

Results
	Winner	Moreno Argentin (ITA)	(Ariostea)
	Second	Claude Criquielion (BEL)	(Lotto)
	Third	Claudio Chiappucci (ITA)	(Carrera Jeans–Tassoni)

The 1991 La Flèche Wallonne was the 55th edition of La Flèche Wallonne cycle race and was held on 17 April 1991. The race started in Spa and finished in Huy. The race was won by Moreno Argentin of the Ariostea team.

== General classification ==
Final general classification

Rank	Rider	Team	Time
1	Moreno Argentin (ITA)	Ariostea	5h 13' 14"
2	Claude Criquielion (BEL)	Lotto	+ 2' 20"
3	Claudio Chiappucci (ITA)	Carrera Jeans–Tassoni	+ 2' 31"
4	Jean-François Bernard (FRA)	Banesto	+ 2' 39"
5	Dimitri Konyshev (URS)	TVM–Sanyo	+ 3' 02"
6	Johan Bruyneel (BEL)	Lotto	+ 4' 19"
7	Eric Van Lancker (BEL)	Panasonic–Sportlife	+ 4' 26"
8	Marino Lejarreta (ESP)	ONCE	+ 4' 53"
9	Iñaki Gastón (ESP)	CLAS–Cajastur	+ 4' 58"
10	Benny Heylen (BEL)	SEFB–Saxon	+ 4' 58"
