= 1987 Liège–Bastogne–Liège =

Race details
- Dates: 19 April 1987
- Stages: 1
- Distance: 260 km (160 mi)
- Winning time: 6h 40' 00"

Results
| | Winner | Moreno Argentin (ITA) | (Gewiss–Bianchi) |
| | Second | Stephen Roche (IRL) | (Carrera Jeans–Vagabond) |
| | Third | Claude Criquielion (BEL) | (Hitachi–Marc) |

The 1987 Liège–Bastogne–Liège was the 73rd edition of the Liège–Bastogne–Liège cycle race and was held on 19 April 1987. The race started and finished in Liège. The race was won by Moreno Argentin of the Gewiss–Bianchi team.

== General classification ==
Final general classification

| Rank | Rider | Team | Time |
|---|---|---|---|
| 1 | Moreno Argentin (ITA) | Gewiss–Bianchi | 6h 40' 00" |
| 2 | Stephen Roche (IRL) | Carrera Jeans–Vagabond | + 0" |
| 3 | Claude Criquielion (BEL) | Hitachi–Marc | + 0" |
| 4 | Yvon Madiot (FRA) | Système U | + 0" |
| 5 | Robert Millar (GBR) | Panasonic–Isostar | + 0" |
| 6 | Laurent Fignon (FRA) | Système U | + 25" |
| 7 | Marc Madiot (FRA) | Système U | + 58" |
| 8 | Eddy Schepers (BEL) | Carrera Jeans–Vagabond | + 58" |
| 9 | Emanuele Bombini (ITA) | Gewiss–Bianchi | + 58" |
| 10 | Jean-Claude Leclercq (FRA) | Toshiba–Look | + 58" |
