= 1987 Giro di Lombardia =

Race details
- Dates: 17 October 1987
- Stages: 1
- Distance: 265 km (164.7 mi)
- Winning time: 6h 52' 10"

Results
	Winner	Moreno Argentin (ITA)	(Gewiss–Bianchi)
	Second	Eric Van Lancker (BEL)	(Panasonic–Isostar)
	Third	Marc Madiot (FRA)	(Système U)

The 1987 Giro di Lombardia was the 81st edition of the Giro di Lombardia cycle race and was held on 17 October 1987. It started in Como, finished in Milan and was won by Moreno Argentin of the Gewiss–Bianchi team.

== General classification ==
Final general classification

Rank	Rider	Team	Time
1	Moreno Argentin (ITA)	Gewiss–Bianchi	6h 52' 10"
2	Eric Van Lancker (BEL)	Panasonic–Isostar	+ 0"
3	Marc Madiot (FRA)	Système U	+ 0"
4	Éric Boyer (FRA)	Système U	+ 22"
5	Ennio Salvador (ITA)	Gis Gelati–Jollyscarpe	+ 22"
6	Walter Magnago (ITA)	Carrera Jeans–Vagabond	+ 22"
7	Claude Criquielion (BEL)	Hitachi–Marc	+ 22"
8	Flavio Giupponi (ITA)	Del Tongo	+ 22"
9	Charly Mottet (FRA)	Système U	+ 22"
10	Leo Schönenberger (SUI)	Fibok–Mueller	+ 1' 02"
