= 1985 Liège–Bastogne–Liège =

Race details
- Dates: 21 April 1985
- Stages: 1
- Distance: 244.7 km (152.0 mi)
- Winning time: 6h 37' 00"

Results
	Winner	Moreno Argentin (ITA)	(Sammontana–Bianchi)
	Second	Claude Criquielion (BEL)	(Hitachi–Splendor–Sunair)
	Third	Stephen Roche (IRL)	(La Redoute)

The 1985 Liège–Bastogne–Liège was the 71st edition of the Liège–Bastogne–Liège cycle race and was held on 21 April 1985. The race started and finished in Liège. The race was won by Moreno Argentin of the Sammontana–Bianchi team.

== General classification ==
Final general classification

Rank	Rider	Team	Time
1	Moreno Argentin (ITA)	Sammontana–Bianchi	6h 37' 00"
2	Claude Criquielion (BEL)	Hitachi–Splendor–Sunair	+ 0"
3	Stephen Roche (IRL)	La Redoute	+ 0"
4	Sean Kelly (IRL)	Skil–Sem–Kas–Miko	+ 16"
5	Laurent Fignon (FRA)	Renault–Elf	+ 16"
6	Guido Van Calster (BEL)	Ariostea–Oece	+ 16"
7	Phil Anderson (AUS)	Panasonic–Raleigh	+ 16"
8	Mario Beccia (ITA)	Malvor–Bottecchia–Vaporella	+ 16"
9	Acácio da Silva (POR)	Malvor–Bottecchia–Vaporella	+ 2' 46"
10	Steven Rooks (NED)	Panasonic–Raleigh	+ 2' 46"
