= 1989 Milan–San Remo =

1989 UCI Road World Cup, race 1 of 12

Race details
- Dates: 18 March 1989
- Stages: 1
- Distance: 294 km (183 mi)
- Winning time: 7h 08' 19"

Results
	Winner	Laurent Fignon (FRA)	(Super U–Raleigh–Fiat)
	Second	Frans Maassen (NED)	(Superconfex–Yoko–Opel–Colnago)
	Third	Adriano Baffi (ITA)	(Ariostea)

The 1989 Milan–San Remo was the 80th edition of the Milan–San Remo cycle race and was held on 18 March 1989. The race started in Milan and finished in San Remo. The race was won by Laurent Fignon of the Système U team.

== General classification ==
Final general classification

Rank	Rider	Team	Time
1	Laurent Fignon (FRA)	Super U–Raleigh–Fiat	7h 08' 19"
2	Frans Maassen (NED)	Superconfex–Yoko–Opel–Colnago	+ 7"
3	Adriano Baffi (ITA)	Ariostea	+ 30"
4	Ronan Pensec (FRA)	Z–Peugeot	+ 30"
5	Sean Kelly (IRL)	PDM–Ultima–Concorde	+ 30"
6	Danilo Gioia (ITA)	Atala–Campagnolo	+ 30"
7	Rudy Dhaenens (BEL)	PDM–Ultima–Concorde	+ 30"
8	Gérard Rué (FRA)	Super U–Raleigh–Fiat	+ 30"
9	Giuseppe Calcaterra (ITA)	Atala–Campagnolo	+ 30"
10	Etienne De Wilde (BEL)	Histor–Sigma	+ 30"
