= 1988 Milan–San Remo =

Race details
- Dates: 19 March 1988
- Stages: 1
- Distance: 294 km (183 mi)
- Winning time: 7h 06' 20"

Results
	Winner	Laurent Fignon (FRA)	(Système U–Gitane)
	Second	Maurizio Fondriest (ITA)	(Alfa Lum–Legnano–Ecoflam)
	Third	Steven Rooks (NED)	(PDM–Ultima–Concorde)

The 1988 Milan–San Remo was the 79th edition of the Milan–San Remo cycle race and was held on 19 March 1988. The race started in Milan and finished in San Remo. The race was won by Laurent Fignon of the Système U team.

== General classification ==
Final general classification

Rank	Rider	Team	Time
1	Laurent Fignon (FRA)	Système U–Gitane	7h 06' 20"
2	Maurizio Fondriest (ITA)	Alfa Lum–Legnano–Ecoflam	+ 0"
3	Steven Rooks (NED)	PDM–Ultima–Concorde	+ 8"
4	Fabio Roscioli (ITA)	Ariostea–Gres	+ 8"
5	Sean Kelly (IRL)	Kas–Canal 10	+ 8"
6	Giuseppe Calcaterra (ITA)	Atala–Ofmega	+ 8"
7	Adri van der Poel (NED)	PDM–Ultima–Concorde	+ 8"
8	Erich Maechler (SUI)	Carrera Jeans–Vagabond	+ 8"
9	Rolf Gölz (FRG)	Superconfex–Yoko–Opel–Colnago	+ 8"
10	Giuseppe Petito (ITA)	GIS–Ecoflam–Jolly	+ 10"
