= 1991 Liège–Bastogne–Liège =

Race details
- Dates: 21 April 1991
- Stages: 1
- Distance: 267 km (166 mi)
- Winning time: 7h 15' 00"

Results
	Winner	Moreno Argentin (ITA)	(Ariostea)
	Second	Claude Criquielion (BEL)	(Lotto)
	Third	Rolf Sørensen (DEN)	(Ariostea)

The 1991 Liège–Bastogne–Liège was the 77th edition of the Liège–Bastogne–Liège cycle race and was held on 21 April 1991. The race started and finished in Liège. The race was won by Moreno Argentin of the Ariostea team.

== General classification ==
Final general classification

Rank	Rider	Team	Time
1	Moreno Argentin (ITA)	Ariostea	7h 15' 00"
2	Claude Criquielion (BEL)	Lotto	+ 0"
3	Rolf Sørensen (DEN)	Ariostea	+ 0"
4	Miguel Induráin (ESP)	Banesto	+ 0"
5	Eric Van Lancker (BEL)	Panasonic–Sportlife	+ 10"
6	Raúl Alcalá (MEX)	PDM–Concorde–Ultima	+ 10"
7	Marino Lejarreta (ESP)	ONCE	+ 10"
8	Stephen Roche (IRL)	Tonton Tapis–GB	+ 10"
9	Edwig Van Hooydonck (BEL)	Buckler–Colnago–Decca	+ 2' 30"
10	Dirk De Wolf (BEL)	Tonton Tapis–GB	+ 2' 36"
