= 1986 Liège–Bastogne–Liège =

Race details
- Dates: 20 April 1986
- Stages: 1
- Distance: 252 km (157 mi)
- Winning time: 6h 41' 21"

Results
	Winner	Moreno Argentin (ITA)	(Sammontana–Bianchi)
	Second	Adri van der Poel (NED)	(Kwantum–Decosol–Yoko)
	Third	Dag Erik Pedersen (NOR)	(Ariostea–Gres)

The 1986 Liège–Bastogne–Liège was the 72nd edition of the Liège–Bastogne–Liège cycle race and was held on 20 April 1986. The race started and finished in Liège. The race was won by Moreno Argentin of the Sammontana–Bianchi team.

== General classification ==
Final general classification

Rank	Rider	Team	Time
1	Moreno Argentin (ITA)	Sammontana–Bianchi	6h 41' 21"
2	Adri van der Poel (NED)	Kwantum–Decosol–Yoko	+ 0"
3	Dag Erik Pedersen (NOR)	Ariostea–Gres	+ 0"
4	Claude Criquielion (BEL)	Hitachi–Marc	+ 0"
5	Steven Rooks (NED)	PDM–Ultima–Concorde	+ 20"
6	Marc Sergeant (BEL)	Lotto–Emerxil–Merckx	+ 20"
7	Jean-Philippe Vandenbrande (BEL)	Hitachi–Marc	+ 44"
8	Roberto Pagnin (ITA)	Malvor–Bottecchia–Vaporella	+ 44"
9	Hubert Seiz (SUI)	Supermercati Brianzoli	+ 55"
10	Heinz Imboden (SUI)	Cilo–Aufina–Gemeaz Cusin	+ 1' 00"
