= 1987 Tour of Flanders =

71st Tour of Flanders
Race details
- Dates: 5 April 1987
- Stages: 1
- Distance: 274 km (170.3 mi)
- Winning time: 7h 15' 30"

Results
	Winner	Claude Criquielion (BEL)	(Hitachi)
	Second	Sean Kelly (IRL)	(KAS)
	Third	Eric Vanderaerden (BEL)	(Panasonic)

The 71st running of the Tour of Flanders cycling race was held on 5 April 1987. It was won by Claude Criquielion after a 10 km solo breakaway. 88 of 233 starters finished the race.

== Race report ==
Danish rider Jesper Skibby was in the early breakaway, before going solo. On the slippery cobbles of the Koppenberg, he fell onto the road banking and was subsequently run over by an official's car. After the Koppenberg, a group of ten riders, containing most favourites, broke clear. Claude Criquielion broke away from the elite group just after the Bosberg, the last climb of the day, and powered on to the finish. Sean Kelly won the sprint for second place before Eric Vanderaerden. Criquielion was the first French-speaking Belgian rider to win the Tour of Flanders and the only one until Philippe Gilbert won the 2017 Tour of Flanders.

== Route ==
The race started in Sint-Niklaas and finished in Meerbeke (Ninove) – totaling 275 km. The course featured 13 categorized climbs:

- Molenberg
- Oude Kwaremont
- Paterberg
- Koppenberg
- Taaienberg
- Berg ten Houte
- Eikenberg
- Varent
- Keiweg-Leberg
- Berendries
- Muur-Kapelmuur
- Bosberg
- Pollareberg

== Results ==
Result
Rank	Rider	Team	Time
1	Claude Criquielion (BEL)	Hitachi	7h 15' 30"
2	Sean Kelly (IRL)	KAS	+ 1' 00"
3	Eric Vanderaerden (BEL)	Panasonic	s.t.
4	Steve Bauer (CAN)	Toshiba–La Vie Claire	s.t.
5	Marc Sergeant (BEL)	Lotto–Merckx	s.t.
6	Steven Rooks (NED)	PDM	s.t.
7	Ronny Van Holen (BEL)	Lucas–Mullers	s.t.
8	Adrie van der Poel (NED)	PDM	s.t.
9	Ludo Peeters (BEL)	Superconfex	s.t.
10	Allan Peiper (AUS)	Panasonic	s.t.
