= Coors Classic =

Cycling race in the United States

Coors International Bicycle Classic
Race details
- Region: USA
- Discipline: Road stage race
- Race director: Michael Aisner

History
- First edition: 1980
- Editions: 9 as Coors, 14 total
- Final edition: 1988
- First winner: (United States) John Howard (Red Zinger) Jonathan Boyer (Coors Classic)
- Most wins: (United States) Dale Stetina (United States) Greg LeMond 2 times
- Final winner: (United States) Davis Phinney

The Coors International Bicycle Classic (1980–1988) was a stage race sponsored by the Coors Brewing Company. Coors was the race's second sponsor; the first, Celestial Seasonings, named the race after its premium tea Red Zinger, which began in 1975. Over the years, the event became America's national tour, listed as the fourth largest race in the world after the Tour de France, Giro d'Italia, and Vuelta a España. The race grew from 3 days of racing in its first years as the Red Zinger Bicycle Classic to 2 weeks in the later Coors Classic years. Race stages were held in Colorado in the early years, expanding first from Boulder and Denver back to the Keystone ski resort, later adding Estes Park, Vail, Aspen, and Grand Junction, before further expansion that included Wyoming, Nevada, California, and Hawaii. All but the last year the race concluded with a short circuit in North Boulder Park. On August 4, 2010, Colorado governor Bill Ritter and cycling legend Lance Armstrong announced that they would revive stage racing in Colorado with the USA Pro Cycling Challenge. It was a seven-day race held in August 2011.

== History ==
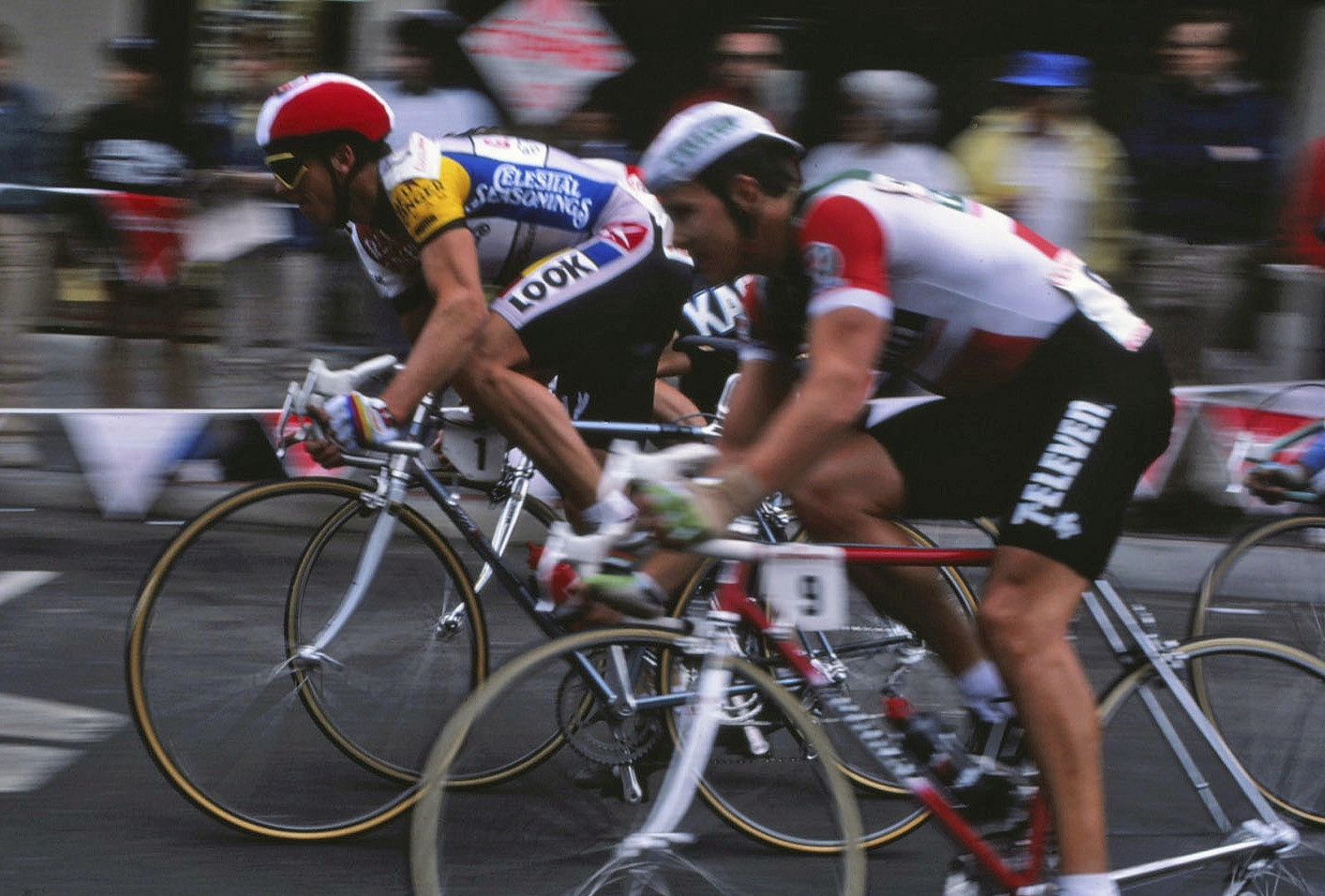
Greg LeMond (w. 1981, 1985) during the 1986 Coors Classic.

In 1975, Mo Siegel and John and Wyck Hay, founders of the Celestial Seasonings herbal tea company, launched the Red Zinger Bicycle Classic race to promote their new Red Zinger tea.

In 1979, Michael Aisner, the race's then PR director, bought the race for one dollar from Siegel, and with his blessing took the idea of a grander event to Peter Coors, the beer impresario.

Over the next eight years, the Coors Classic grew into two weeks of racing in California, Nevada, and Colorado, with stages in some years in Hawaii and Wyoming. The race's legendary merchandise had custom annual graphics, sold in every state (and even Japan and England), generating $1 million in 1987 and $1.5 million in 1988 in sales to help support the race.

The Red Zinger and Coors Classic stage races showcased world-class men and women's cycling throughout the scenic terrain of Colorado, California, Nevada, Wyoming, and Hawaii. The race was considered the fourth biggest race on the world cycling calendar and was ground-breaking as the single biggest women's stage race ever held.

The Coors Classic launched the careers of some of the world's greatest cyclists and paved the way for the sport's growth in the U.S.

A permanent tribute to the Classics was created in 2018 in North Boulder Park, where the race ended 12 of its 13 years. Plaques tell the stories of the race near a cobblestone Champions Plaza, where the 19 winner's names are inscribed.

== Winners ==
1975	John Howard	United States	Hannah North	United States
1976	John Howard	United States	No women's race	
1977	Wayne Stetina	United States	Connie Carpenter	United States
1978	George Mount	United States	Keetie van Oosten-Hage	Netherlands
1979	Dale Stetina	United States	Keetie van Oosten-Hage	Netherlands
1980	Jonathan Boyer	United States	Beth Heiden	United States
1981	Greg LeMond	United States	Connie Carpenter	United States
1982	Patrocinio Jimenez	Colombia	Connie Carpenter	United States
1983	Dale Stetina	United States	Rebecca Twigg	United States
1984	Doug Shapiro	United States	Maria Canins	Italy
1985	Greg LeMond	United States	Jeannie Longo	France
1986	Bernard Hinault	France	Jeannie Longo	France
1987	Raúl Alcalá	Mexico	Jeannie Longo	France
1988	Davis Phinney	United States	Inga Thompson	United States

== Facts ==
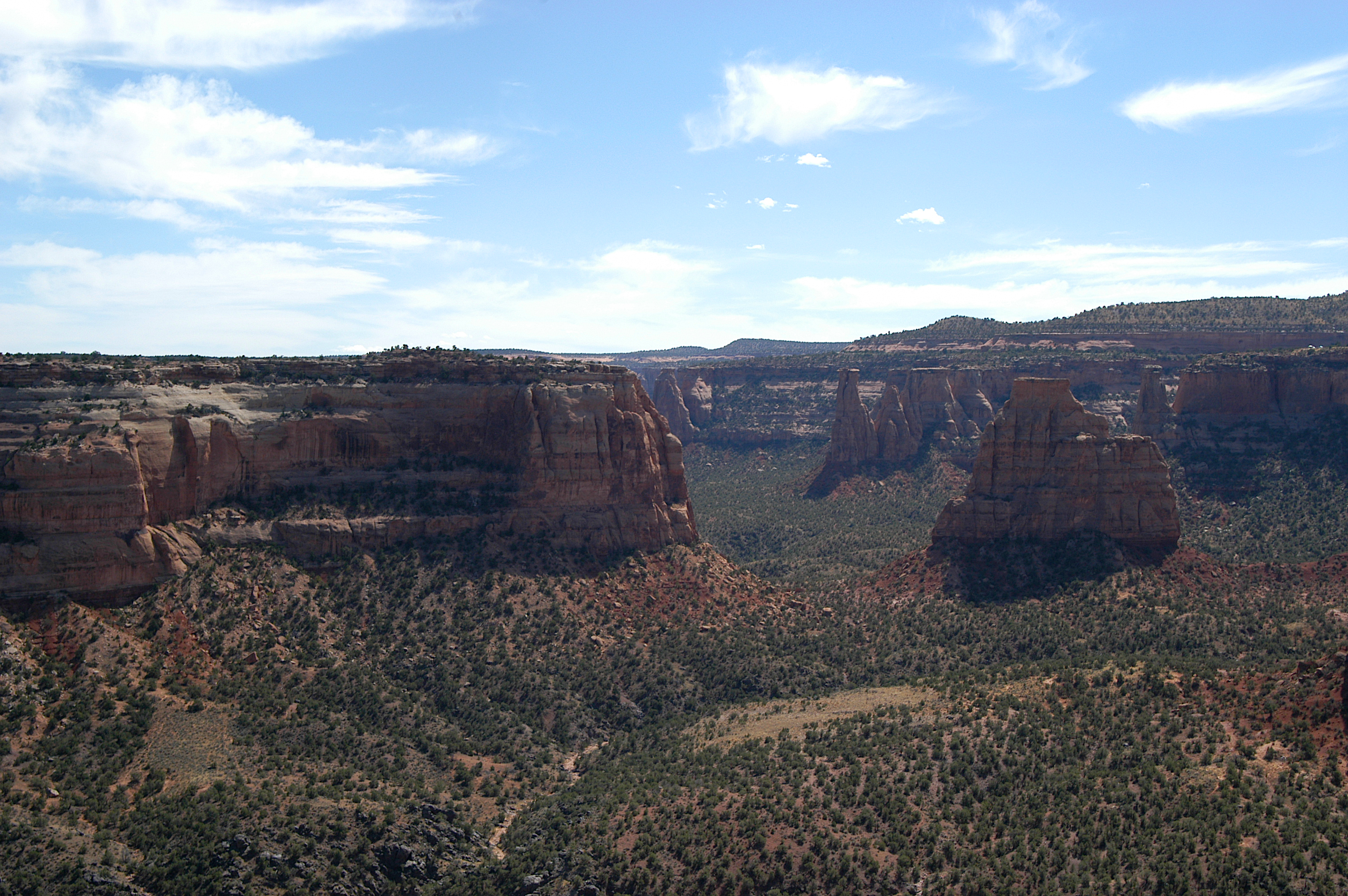
Colorado National Monument, in western Colorado, site of the "Tour of the Moon" road race stages

The Coors International Bicycle Classic had many storied stages, including the world-renowned Morgul-Bismarck circuit. The site of the Grand Junction, Colorado, road race, the Colorado National Monument, was so exotic in appearance that the stage became known as "The Tour of the Moon" and was even featured in the Warner Brothers movie American Flyers. One recurring stage near Snowmass, Colorado, was run up "Suicide Hill", a road so steep that it was heated in the winter. Races were run over mountains such as the Vail, Independence, and McClure Passes in Colorado. Popular recurring stages in California included San Francisco-area events such as a hill climb up to famed Coit Tower for a prologue and the Fisherman's Wharf Criterium and a road stage crossing the Sierra Nevada range. One year the race also started in Hawaii's Big Island in Hilo with a volcano circuit road race that had to be rerouted a month before the event when the perimeter road course was cut off by a lava flow from Kilauea. Another year a stage went from Wyoming's capitol, Cheyenne, to Colorado's capitol, Denver. The race finished every year but its last in North Boulder Park.

The Red Zinger/Coors Classic served as an inspiration for a youth bicycle road racing series in Colorado called the Red Zinger Mini Classics, which ran from 1981–1992, serving as a springboard for the development of several professional cyclists, including pro greats Bobby Julich, Jonathan Vaughters, Chris Wherry, Ruthie Matthes, Colby Pearce and Jimi Killen.

== See also ==
- Colorado Classic, Colorado cycling race held for both men and women in 2017 and 2018; becomes a women-only event from 2019 forward
- USA Pro Cycling Challenge, Colorado cycling race held from 2011-2015
