= Morgul-Bismark =

Road cycling route near Boulder, Colorado, U.S.

The Morgul-Bismark Loop is a popular road cycling route or stage south of Boulder, Colorado. It was featured in the bygone Red Zinger Bicycle Classic and Coors International Bicycle Classic, and is still commonly ridden today. Riders who have traversed the stage include Greg LeMond, Bernard Hinault, Andy Hampsten, Luis Herrera, Eddy Merckx and Davis Phinney. The course was also used by the Red Zinger Mini Classics youth road bicycle racing series from 1981 to 1992.

The loop is 13.1 miles (21.1 km), and includes undulating terrain and several steep inclines, including "The Wall", which is located at the south terminus of McCaslin Boulevard where it intersects with State Highway 128. "The Wall" is a one-mile gradual incline that increases to an 18% grade.

In the days of the Coors Classic, which folded in 1988, riders would circuit the loop eight times and culminate with a dramatic sprint to the top of "The Wall", which has been attested as a very painful stretch and the source of the climb's name. Back then, the route traversed open prairie land which is now largely developed by Superior, Colorado. Many cyclists lament the encroachment of urban sprawl onto one of the world's favorite stages, but most cyclists seem unfettered as they continue to ride Morgul-Bismarck to this day. The town of Superior has made an effort to this effect by furnishing most of McCaslin Boulevard with a widened shoulder and designated bicycle lane as of 2007. In 2010, the town completed construction on a roundabout at the intersection of McCaslin Boulevard and Coalton Road.

After the Coors Classic ended, Randy Gaffney, Davis Phinney, Ron Kiefel and Art Allen opened a shop on University Hill in Boulder, called 'Morgul Bismark Bicycles'. Following the closure of the bicycle shop, Rainbow Cyclecraft of Niwot purchased the rights to the Morgul-Bismark name from the partners, and produced bicycles from 1998 to 2002.

There is a prevalent myth that "Morgul" and "Bismark" were the names of Joe and Michele (Bishop) Leiper's dog and cat. Joe was a local racer, frame builder and bike shop owner in Boulder. No myth. Actually, Morgul the Friendly Drelb (Laugh-In) was my and Joe's cat and Bismark was Al Hubbard's dog .

In the 1985 film American Flyers, the first race in the film was shot on location at the Morgul-Bismark.

Both spellings of Bismark were used in various years of the Coors Classic.

On January 17, 2010 it was announced by the Boulder Daily Camera that the city of Superior, Colorado is bringing back the race beginning Memorial Day weekend 2010. The race was renamed the "Superior Morgul Classic". The three-day event encompasses a wide range of race events, art festival, music, and a public showing of the movie "American Flyers". The race was most recently held May 21, 2017, although the course was modified to include only the south portion of the loop in an out-and-back format, including "The Wall" and the rolling terrain along Highway 128. The next Superior Morgul weekend returns in mid-May 2019.

In mid-2011, local open space agencies finished and opened some new trails (Coalton, Meadowlark), providing for an off-road cycling loop within the bounds of the classic Morgul Bismark road route; the popular trail route of approx. 15 miles is dubbed the Dirty Bismark.
