= Fred Rompelberg =

Dutch cyclist (born 1945)

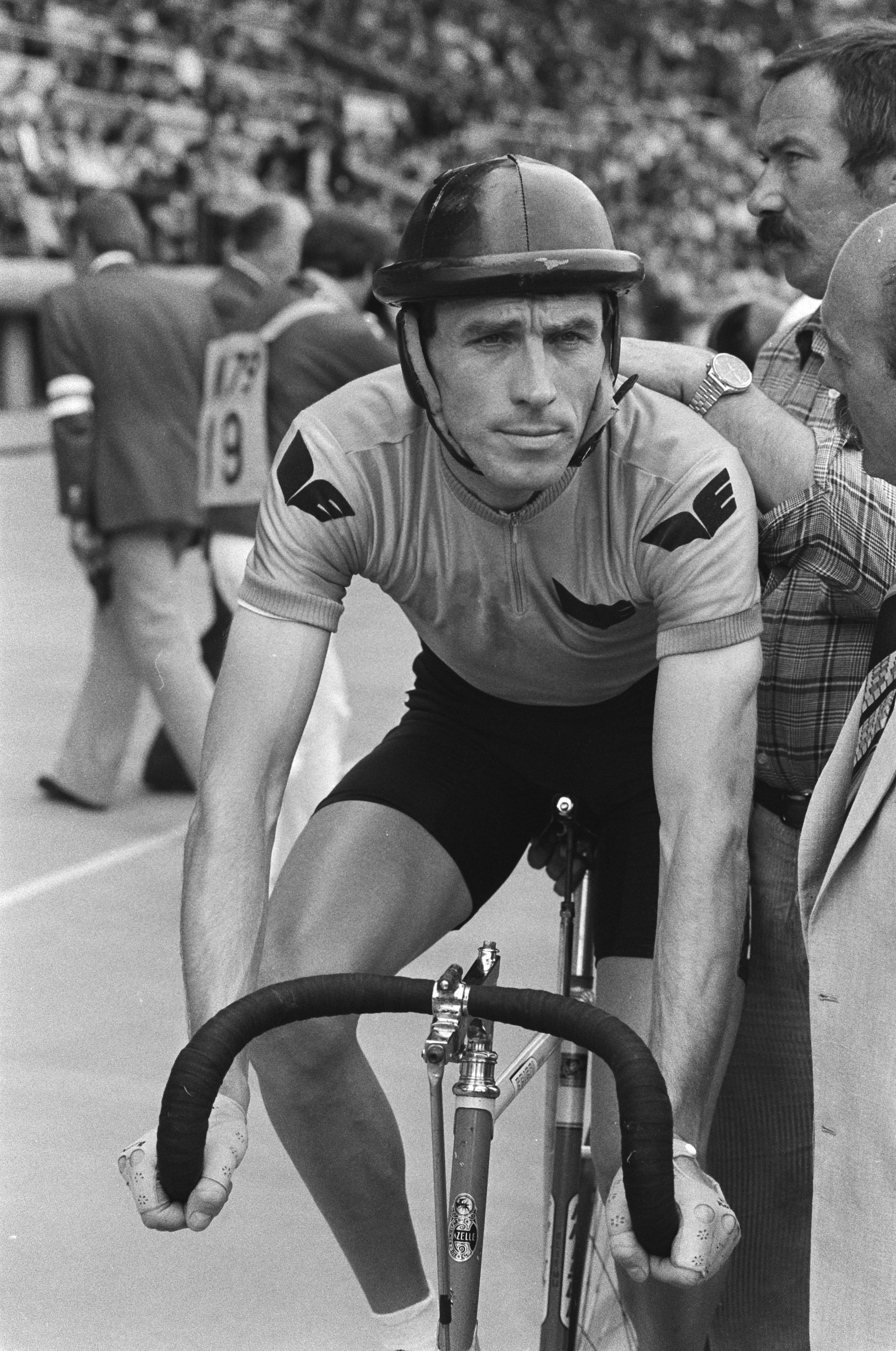
- Rompelberg in 1979

Personal information
- Born: 30 October 1945 (age 80) Maastricht, Netherlands

Cycling career
- Sport: Cycling
- Disciplines: Road; Track
- Role: Rider

Fred Rompelberg (born 30 October 1945) is a Dutch cyclist who is mainly known for making several attempts to break the Absolute World Speed Record Cycling. On 3 October 1995 he cycled behind a motor dragster from the team Strasburg Racing's Brothers on the Bonneville Salt Flats in Utah, with a speed of 268.831 kilometers per hour (167.044 mph). He beat the previous record of 245 km/h by John Howard, which was set in 1985 at the same location in Utah. The relevant world record was broken anew in 2018 by Denise Mueller-Korenek who reached a speed of 296.009 km/h.

During the seventies, eighties and nineties, Rompelberg was mostly active as a stayer. Among his victories was the Dutch Championship in 1977.

Nowadays Rompelberg is into cycling holidays on Mallorca, Spain. He is married and has two daughters.

Rompelberg became a professional cyclist in 1971 and still had a professional license in 2010, making him the oldest active professional cyclist in the world at that time.

== Successes ==
- 11 world records,
- 12 European records,
- 7 wins in bicycle road races,
- Dutch champion on a bicycle behind heavy motorcycles, many victories behind heavy motorbikes on bicycle routes,
- Current holder of the hour against the clock world record behind heavy engines with 86.449 km / h
- Current holder of the 100 km world record behind heavy engines with 1h 10 '363/100'
- The Absolute Speed World Record Cycling behind a dragster on a dried up American salt flat with 268.831 km / h.

== See also ==
- Fastest speed on a bicycle
