= Denise Mueller-Korenek =

American record-holding cyclist

Denise Mueller-Korenek (born c. 1973) is an American cyclist. As of September 2018, she holds the world record for paced bicycle land speed and is considered "the fastest cyclist on earth". She set the record on September 16, 2018, at the Bonneville Salt Flats in Utah, by traveling an average of 183.932 mph (296.009 km/h) on a custom-built carbon KHS bicycle behind a custom-built vehicle to minimize air resistance. The previous record, 167 miles per hour (269 km/h), was set in 1995 by Dutchman Fred Rompelberg. Two years earlier she set the women's bicycle land speed record, pedaling 147.7 mph (237.7 km/h). She is the first and only woman in history to hold the world record, which was first established in 1899.

== Early life and education ==
Denise Mueller was born into a family of daredevils. Her father, Myron Mueller, was an ultra-distance cyclist; he celebrated his 70th birthday by pedaling the entire perimeter of the coterminous United States, a distance of more than 12,000 miles (19,000 km). He is in the Guinness Book of World Records as the oldest person to bicycle that perimeter. Her mother, Anna Dement, raced midget demolition-derby cars. "In our family, crazy is our sort of normal," Denise said. She graduated from San Dieguito High School in Encinitas, California.

In 1991, she appeared in a segment with her mentor John Howard in an instructional videotape produced by New & Unique Videos entitled "John Howard's Lessons in Cycling" which won an International Film & TV Festival of New York Silver Medal and a National Telly Award.

== Career ==
Mueller competed as a junior cyclist in her teens and finished in the top three in national and world competitions more than a dozen times. She won national championships in road, track and mountain biking 15 times. She retired in 1992 at age 19. She went to work for her family's security company, eventually becoming president and CEO.

In 2009, Mueller resumed bicycling and running, competing in marathons and Ironman Triathlon competitions. Her trainer, both in her teens and later, is John Howard, a three-time Olympian and holder of the world speed record before Rompelberg. Mueller-Korenek decided to go for the speed record when Howard told her no woman had ever attempted it. She began seriously training to set a new bicycle speed record in 2012. Along the way she won two national titles for her age group. In 2016, she made her first run at the record at the Bonneville Salt Flats. Her speed of 147.7 mph (237.7 km/h) established the women's world record.

In paced bicycle racing, the cyclist follows immediately behind a pace car equipped with a wind shield, so that they are pedaling in the car's slipstream. Riding at that speed just inches behind a pace car is so dangerous that most world-class cyclists do not attempt it. The custom bicycle is geared so high that it has to be towed by the pace car until it reaches 90 to 100 miles per hour (140 to 160 km/h); the cyclist then casts off the towrope and pedals under their own power. Rompelberg, whose record she was trying to break, encouraged her efforts and allowed her to use as a pace car the same custom 1,000-horsepower (750 kW) dragster he had used in setting the record. The pace car was driven by professional race car driver Shea Holbrook. In her 2018 attempt, Mueller-Korenek circled the track 3 1/2 times after casting off the tow rope, breaking the world record on her final mile. Her goal had been to break the previous record of 167 mph (269 km/h); she was surprised to learn she had reached 183.9 mph (296.0 km/h), breaking Rompelberg's record by almost 17 mph (27 km/h). "We weren't supposed to go more than 175," she said.
