= American Flyers =

1985 American sports drama film

- Theatrical release poster
- Directed by: John Badham
- Written by: Steve Tesich
- Produced by: Paula Weinstein; Gareth Wigan
- Starring: Kevin Costner; David Grant; Rae Dawn Chong; Alexandra Paul; Janice Rule
- Cinematography: Donald Peterman
- Edited by: Jeff Jones; Frank Morriss; Dallas Puett
- Music by: Greg Mathieson; Lee Ritenour
- Distributed by: Warner Bros. Pictures
- Release date: August 16, 1985
- Running time: 113 minutes
- Country: United States
- Language: English
- Budget: $8.5 million
- Box office: $1,420,355

American Flyers is a 1985 American sports drama film about bicycle racing. It was directed by John Badham and written by Steve Tesich. The film stars Kevin Costner, David Marshall Grant, Rae Dawn Chong, Alexandra Paul and Janice Rule.

== Plot ==
Sports physician Marcus Sommers visits his family in St. Louis, Missouri, after being away a long time. Marcus immediately gets into a fight with his mother over the way she handled the death of his father from a cerebral aneurysm. Marcus asks his brother David to come back to Madison with him to spend time together.

With the history of cerebral aneurysm in the Sommers family, their mother is concerned that the condition may now be affecting David as well. Marcus convinces David to undergo testing at his sports medicine center. Before the test starts David says that he just wants to go one second longer than Marcus. David breaks Marcus' record as Marcus begins cheering him on with everyone else in the room. David overhears a conversation in which Marcus says that he does not want to worry David about something. David assumes that he does have an aneurysm.

Marcus shows David and his girlfriend Sarah a "Hell of the West" video of a past race in which Marcus points out the moment he quit mid-race. Marcus tells them that he got so good at quitting that no one can tell anymore. Marcus convinces David to embark on a cross-country journey to the bicycle race "Hell of the West" in Colorado along with Sarah. They camp and David asks Marcus about a cure for an aneurysm and Marcus tells him surgery would destroy the brain's vital functions. Later, David runs into a hitchhiker named Becky at McDonald's and asks her to join them.

The brothers practice "shake and break" and how to trick cowboys in a bike v. horse race. Following a flat tire, Sarah and Becky get an unwelcome visit from Sarah's ex-husband Barry Muzzin and his friend Jerome who are also Marcus's old cycling rivals. Muzzin crosses the line with Sarah, and she picks up a large rock and threatens him with it. Impressed, Becky keeps the rock.

In the three-stage race in the Rockies, with mountain and prairie backdrops, the brothers compete against the world's top cyclists on dangerous roads at breakneck speeds. Marcus gets a flat tire which Sarah and Becky repair while riders flash by. Marcus heroically regains his place at the front of the race and wins the first stage against Muzzin and Belov the Russian Olympic winner. Following the race, Muzzin berates a female reporter for her part in pushing for the U.S. boycott of the 1980 Summer Olympics. Struggling to make the cut David is crashed into by another rider and his bike is damaged. Marcus, watching from the finish line, tells David to pick up his bike and run with it. David crosses the finish line holding his bike and making the cut for the next stage.

Marcus shows David where the checkpoints are located on the race course. If David can cross all the checkpoints first he'll make up the time he's behind the leaders of the race after stage one. David breaks away during the second stage and crosses the first checkpoint to gain 30 seconds on his time. He then crosses the other checkpoints to gain 2 minutes on his time. Meanwhile, Marcus notices blood is coming out of his nose and ears. Marcus starts to wobble on his bike and realizes he's had an aneurysm. He signals for Sarah and Becky in the team van to help him as he struggles to stay on his bike on the winding road. Sarah grabs Marcus from his bike before his bike soars over the edge of the cliff. The pack of riders catches up to David and he finishes third in stage two. Becky finds David in the crowd and tells him what happened to Marcus.

Struggling, David and Marcus say they love each other. David faces a dilemma: to quit and look after his brother, or continue to defy the odds and win the race. David and Marcus decide to stay in the race. Becky comforts Sarah outside the hospital by showing Sarah the rock Becky saved. David and Marcus' mother shows up at the race and rides with Marcus in the team van.

David sprints to an early lead which the competitors put down to youthful exuberance. But after a few miles they realize that David is able to maintain the savage pace. As they enter the mountain stages Muzzin approaches David to throw the race and settle for second. When David decides to go for the win Muzzin tries to push David off the road. In response David punches Muzzin and races for the finish. David crosses the line first but has to wait to see when Muzzin finishes because of Muzzin's 11-second advantage from stage two. Muzzin struggles to the finish line and looks at the clock showing 11 seconds as he crosses the line. The crowd erupts to celebrate David's victory. David celebrates with his mom, Sarah and Becky. David looks for Marcus in the crowd and sees him alone watching David. David walks over and hugs Marcus. Marcus sees his mother watching and he motions for her to come over to them finally forgiving her. Marcus, David and their mom hug and then smile for a photograph.

== Cast ==
- Kevin Costner as Marcus
- David Marshall Grant as David
- Rae Dawn Chong as Sarah
- Alexandra Paul as Becky
- Janice Rule as Mrs. Sommers
- Luca Bercovici as Barry Muzzin
- Robert Townsend as Jerome
- John Garber as Sergi Belov
- John Amos as Dr. Conrad
- Jennifer Grey as Leslie
- Doi Johnson as Randolph
- Steven Van Zandt as Cyclist

In addition, multiple World Championships and Grand Tour winning cyclist Eddy Merckx has a cameo as himself.

== Featured elements ==
The 7-Eleven team that is featured in the movie was a real life team that competed in the Tour de France and Giro d'Italia in the 1980s. The team was later sponsored by Motorola. Much of the race action was filmed at the Coors Classic, a now-defunct stage race that was one of the USA's leading cycling events at the time of the film. Two stages in the film's featured race, the Morgul-Bismarck circuit race in Boulder and the "Tour of the Moon" at Colorado National Monument, were legendary Coors Classic stages.

Cyclist Eddy Merckx makes a brief appearance, starting stage 1. The character, Barry 'The Cannibal' Muzzin, played by Luca Bercovici was based on Eddy Merckx, who was also called 'The Cannibal'. Jennifer Grey made an appearance as a blind date, made hysterical by the brothers' arguing. John Amos has a supporting role running a training facility, and Robert Townsend has a minor role as a rival teammate.

ShaverSport, the company that sponsors Marcus and David in The Hell of the West, was an actual company. It was formed in 1980 by competitive cyclist Bob Shaver with its mission being to produce quality cycling wear. ShaverSport was asked by Warner Brothers to design the clothing for the film. During its existence, the company produced not only cycling gear, but ShaverSport and Hell of the West replica jerseys that were featured in the film.

Marcus and David are seen riding 1985 Specialized Allez SE road bikes with red frames in the race scenes and most of the movie.

== Reception ==
The film was released before Costner became a Hollywood superstar. It had a limited release on 16 August 1985 and grossed $1.4 million in the US. As of April 2022, American Flyers had a 67% rating on Rotten Tomatoes based on 21 reviews, with an average score of 5.6/10. The site consensus reads: "American Flyers shifts between family drama and cycling action gears with enough strength to make this inspirational sports picture more than pedestrian".

== Soundtrack ==
A soundtrack of the film was released in 1985. The main theme "Hell of the West" was played as the introduction music of the title sequence when ABC Sports in the United States broadcast the International Race of Champions from 1987 to 1997 on tape-delay. Christine McVie of Fleetwood Mac was approached to record a song for the soundtrack; "Slow Down" was recorded but ultimately not used in the film.

== See also ==
- List of films about bicycles and cycling
