= Red Zinger Mini Classics =

Red Zinger Mini Classic
- RZMC Logo by Scott Campbell Reuman (Used with permission)

Race details
- Date: Annually; April–September
- Region: Colorado, United States
- English name: Red Zinger Mini Classic
- Nickname(s): RZMC, Mini Classics, "Zinger"
- Discipline: Bicycle Road racing series for girls and boys
- Competition: Divided by age group/gender: 10-11; 12-13; 14-15; 16-17.
- Type: Stage races 3-5 days each

History
- First edition: 1981
- Final edition: 1992 (Revived 2010)

Red Zinger Mini Classics (RZMC) is a series of youth boys and girls road bicycle races held annually across the state of Colorado from 1981 to 1992, and revived again in 2010. The RZMC races served as an opportunity for young cyclists to get involved in the sport, and attracted hundreds of young boys and girls age 10–15 to each racing event.

== History 1981–1992 ==
This youth series was arguably the biggest youth bike racing series ever conducted in the USA. The name for the Red Zinger Mini Classic was derived from the original Red Zinger Bicycle Classic, a professional international-level bicycle race held in Colorado which later became the Coors Classic.

The RZMC youth races began as the 5-day "Mini Zinger" stage race in 1981 as the brainchild of a former Celestial Seasonings employee Ed Sandvold, who along with sons Erik & Quinn designed an event for kids that parroted the Red Zinger Classic pro/am race. They created a race magazine and clothing and other RZBC looking merchandise. Later young Erik and Quinn were joined by other youth race directors, Mike Hooker and Ron Schwartztrauber.

At that time the US Cycling Federation did not have a good development system for younger cyclists interested in trying the sport. Therefore, the RZMC series allowed kids younger than 17 to get a taste of competitive road cycling. The RZMC organization sought to provide a grass-roots cycling experience to introduce young riders to competitive riding by instituting a number of rules to make the sport more accessible.  Rules such as mandatory first-time racer clinics, bicycle safety inspections, the prohibition of sew-up glue on tires, and restricting entry to non-USCF licensed riders set the race series apart from the USCF.[1]

The series grew to add several smaller 3-day stage races across the state of Colorado and also northern New Mexico. The races included the Horsetooth Stage Race (Fort Collins, Colorado), the Vail Stage Race (Vail/Avon, Colorado), Aspen Stage Race (Aspen, Colorado), Denver Stage Race (Denver, Colorado and suburbs), and the Albuquerque Stage Race (Albuquerque, New Mexico). However, the pinnacle event each season remained the 5-day Mini Zinger stage race, which had events in several locations across the front-range of Colorado, mostly centered around the Boulder, Colorado area.

The Mini Zinger included races on some of Colorado's most famous cycling routes, such as the Morgul-Bismarck in Broomfield, Colorado. Some race courses were adapted as shorter versions of courses made famous by the Coors Classic.

The RZMC youth road cycling races continued until 1992, when several challenges led to the demise of the series, including competition with increasingly popular (and new at that time) mountain bike racing, reducing the number of participants in road events. For the last year of the series (1992) the RZMC series teamed up with the USCF-LAJORS program (US Cycling Federation – Lance Armstrong Junior Olympic Race Series) and had good participation, however rider commitments for a further year in 1993 were minimal and the racing series came to an end. No such youth cycling development program has since taken its place.

== Revival 2010- ==
In 2010 a resurrection of the Red Zinger Mini Classics was planned by Jon Tarkington, executive director of the American Cycling Association (Tarkington raced in the Mini Classics as a teen). The two-day stage race was the first event to recreate the Mini Classic junior cycling program and was based in Silt, Colorado. Consistent with the original Mini Classics, age groups from 8–9 years old up the 17-18 were offered. The promoters, which include race promoter Bill Sommers, hope to expand the revival into a series for 2011.

== Legacy of RZMC ==
The Red Zinger Mini Classics (RZMC) youth cycling race series provided exposure to the world of cycling to hundreds of young athletes, developing a generation of young Colorado cyclists who went on to have a lifelong interest in the sport. RZMC is credited with the early development of several riders who went on to be accomplished professional cyclists including:

- Jonathan Vaughters – Tour de France rider, former US Postal Service Cycling Team member, director sportif of Team Garmin–Sharp
- Bobby Julich – Professional cyclist, former Tour de France rider, 3rd overall 1998 Tour de France, and current Racing Coach of Team BMC
- Chris Wherry – Professional cyclist and 2005 USPRO national road champion
- Ruthie Matthes – Professional mountain bike and road cyclist and 1991 World Mountain Bike Champion
- Colby Pearce – Olympian and world track cycling champion
- Jimi Killen – former professional mountain bike racer and 1990 Junior World Mountain Bike Champion
