= Doug Shapiro =

American cyclist (1959–2025)

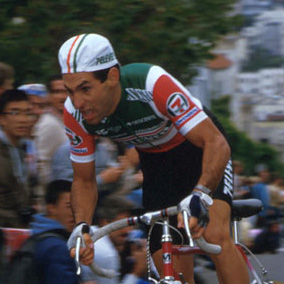
- Shapiro leading the 1984 Coors Classic

Personal information
- Nickname: "The Bullet"
- Born: September 15, 1959 New York City, U.S.
- Died: January 15, 2025 (aged 65) California, U.S.

Cycling career
- Sport: Cycling
- Current team: Retired
- Discipline: Road
- Role: Climber and Sprinter

Professional teams
- 1985: Kwantum Hallen
- 1986–1988: 7-Eleven
- 1989: Coors Light

Major wins
- Coors Classic (1984)

Doug Shapiro (September 15, 1959 – January 15, 2025) was an American professional cyclist who became a bicycle accident consultant. He was a member of two American Olympic teams and was only the third ever American to compete in and finish the Tour de France. For over the last twenty years, he served as a consultant and expert witness to attorneys who represent parties involved in bicycle accident litigation.

Shapiro began his competitive cycling career at the age of thirteen. During his career as both a top amateur and professional racer, Shapiro competed in many countries throughout the world. Shapiro was a member of the American Olympic Team in 1980, but was not able to participate due to United States participation in the 1980 Summer Olympics boycott. He was a member of the 1984 American Olympic team. In 1980, he received a Congressional Gold Medal at the White House due to the 1980 Olympic Boycott.

The Congressional Gold Medal is the highest civilian honor bestowed by Congress, and its first recipient was George Washington, who was so honored on March 25, 1776.

In 1984 Shapiro won American's top cycling stage race, the Coors Classic - riding for the 7-Eleven racing team. The following year, in 1985, Doug Shapiro became just the third American to compete in and finish the Tour de France (achieving 74th place), in addition to finishing third in the 1985 Coors Classic. In 1997, Shapiro was inducted into the Cycling Hall of Fame as part of the 7-Eleven Cycling Team that competed in the 1986 Tour de France. In 1999 he was inducted into the Jewish Sports Hall of Fame.

From 1985 to 1989, Shapiro competed on professional cycling teams. In 1985, Shapiro rode with Jan Raas and Joop Zoetemelk on the Kwantum Hallen Team.

Shapiro built his reputation as a hill climber and sprinter and earned the nickname "Bullet.” After breaking his hip and being advised to retire, Shapiro had an additional successful season before retiring in 1989.

In 1990, Shapiro acted as the technical advisor and technical writer for the video "Cycling for Success,” produced by the 7-Eleven Bike team. The video was the first of its kind to offer cycling safety tips and techniques. It was created for all levels of cyclists, from the serious racer to amateur enthusiast.

Shapiro owned and operated Shapiro & Associates. The Company provides bicycle expert witness services to personal injury attorneys, municipalities, government agencies, manufacturers, and insurance companies that are involved in bicycle accident litigation.

Shapiro died in California after a climbing accident on January 15, 2025, at the age of 65.

== Major results ==
1980
New York State Champion
1984
1st Coors Classic
1st stage 1 Settimana Bergamasca Italy
1st stage 1 Tour De Ardennes France
1985
1st stage 12 Coors Classic
1989
1st stage 6 Tour of Texas
1988
1st National Capital Open
1st Las Vegas Sports Festival

== See also ==
- List of Congressional Gold Medal recipients
