= John Howard (cyclist) =

American cyclist

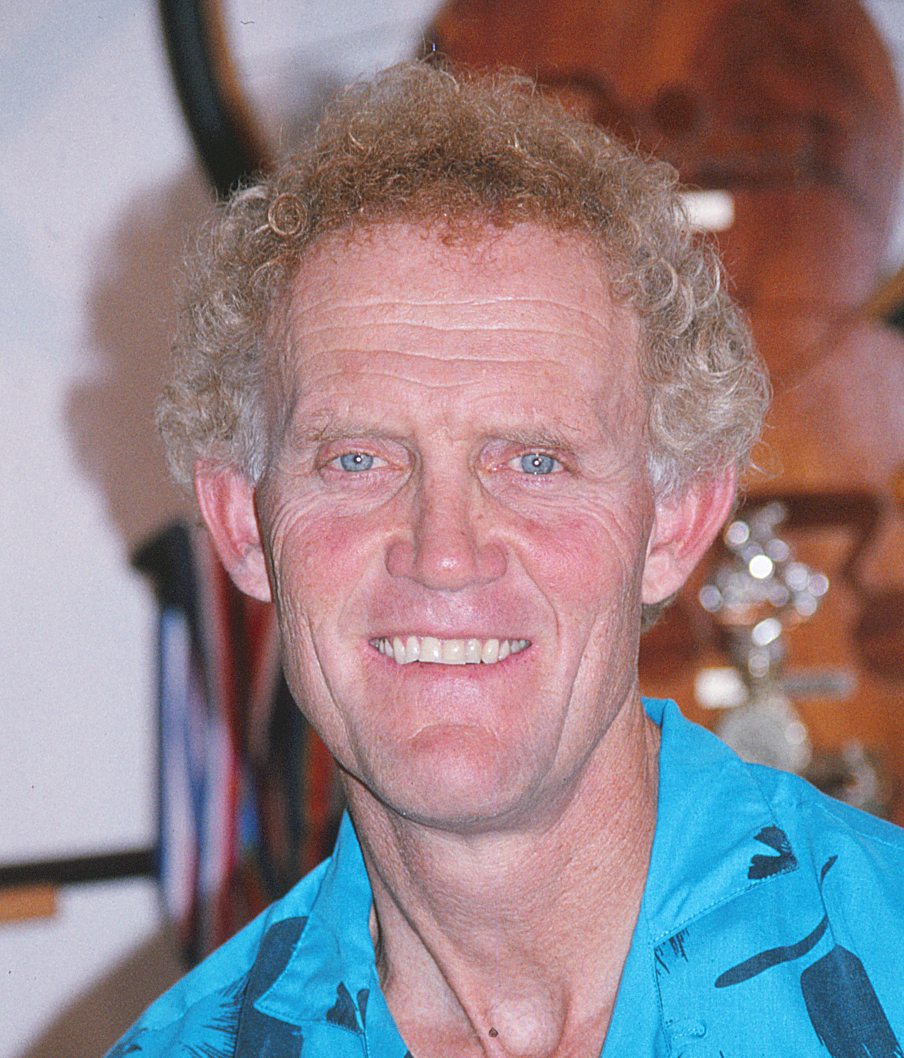
- John Howard, 1991

Personal information
- Born: August 16, 1947 (age 79) Springfield, Missouri, U.S.

Cycling career
- Sport: Cycling
- Role: Rider
Medal record
Men's road cycling
Representing the United States
Pan American Games
Gold medal – first place	1971 Cali	Individual road race
Men's triathlon
Ironman World Championship
Gold medal – first place	1981	Individual
Bronze medal – third place	1980	Individual

John Howard (born August 16, 1947, in Springfield, Missouri) is an Olympic cyclist from the United States, who set a land speed record of 152.2 miles per hour (245 km/h) while motor-pacing on a pedal bicycle on July 20, 1985 on Utah's Bonneville Salt Flats. This record was beaten in 1995 by Fred Rompelberg.

== Career ==
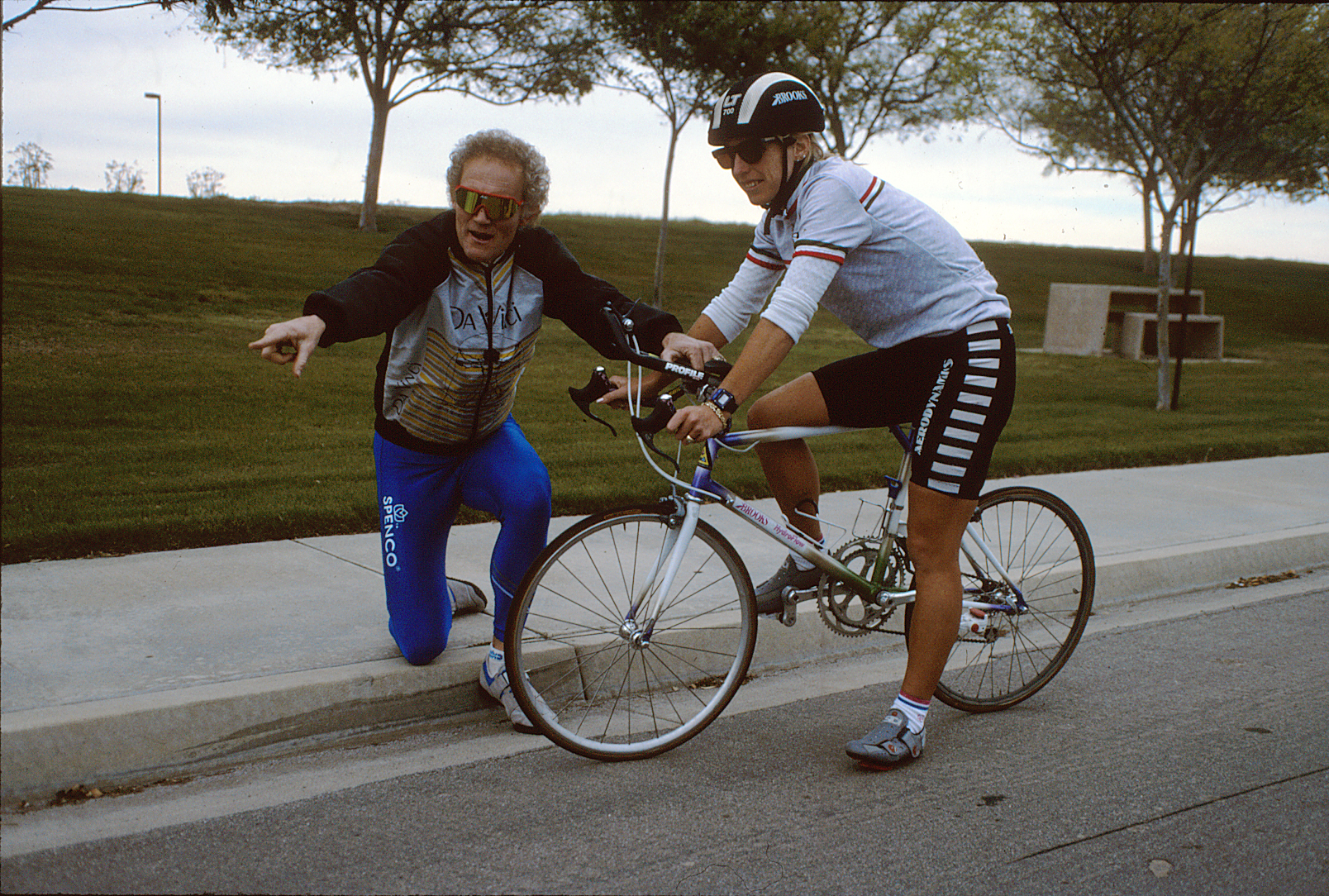
Howard instructs Paula Newby-Fraser in California, 1991

A competitor at the 1968, 1972, and 1976 Summer Olympics, Howard won the gold medal in the 1971 Pan American Games road cycling race in Cali, Colombia, as a member of the U.S. Army cycling team by beating Luis Carlos Florez in a sprint finish. He is a former 4-time U.S. National Road Cycling champion (1968, 1972, 1973 and 1975) and won the 1981 Ironman Triathlon World Championship in Hawaii. Howard won the first two editions of the Red Zinger Bicycle Classic stage race in Colorado in 1975 and 1976.

In 1982, Howard was one of four competitors in the inaugural Race Across America RAAM, eventually finishing second.

On 1985-07-20, Howard set a motor-paced speed record just over 240 kph (over 150 MPH). During a run, the rear tire valve opened due to centrifugal force, causing a flat tire at speed, probably over 215 kph (135 MPH), as he had already gone that fast earlier in the day.

In 1989, John Howard appeared in an instructional videotape produced by New & Unique Videos of San Diego, California, entitled "Ultimate Mountain Biking: Advanced Techniques & Winning Strategies" in which he demonstrated proper stretching and training techniques. In 1991 John Howard produced a video with New & Unique Videos partners Mark Schulze and Patty Mooney, entitled "John Howard's Lessons in Cycling." This instructional videotape featured Jeff Pierce, Marianne Berglund, Martin Graf, Paula Newby-Fraser and Sports Nutritionist Dr. Nick Martin. "Lessons in Cycling" earned a Bronze Telly and a Silver Medal at the International Film & TV Festival in New York.

John Howard has trained several cyclists over the years including working with Denise Mueller-Korenek, who set the paced bicycle land speed record on Sept. 16, 2018, at the Bonneville Salt Flats.

== See also ==
- Cycling records
