= Ruthie Matthes =

American cyclist (born 1965)

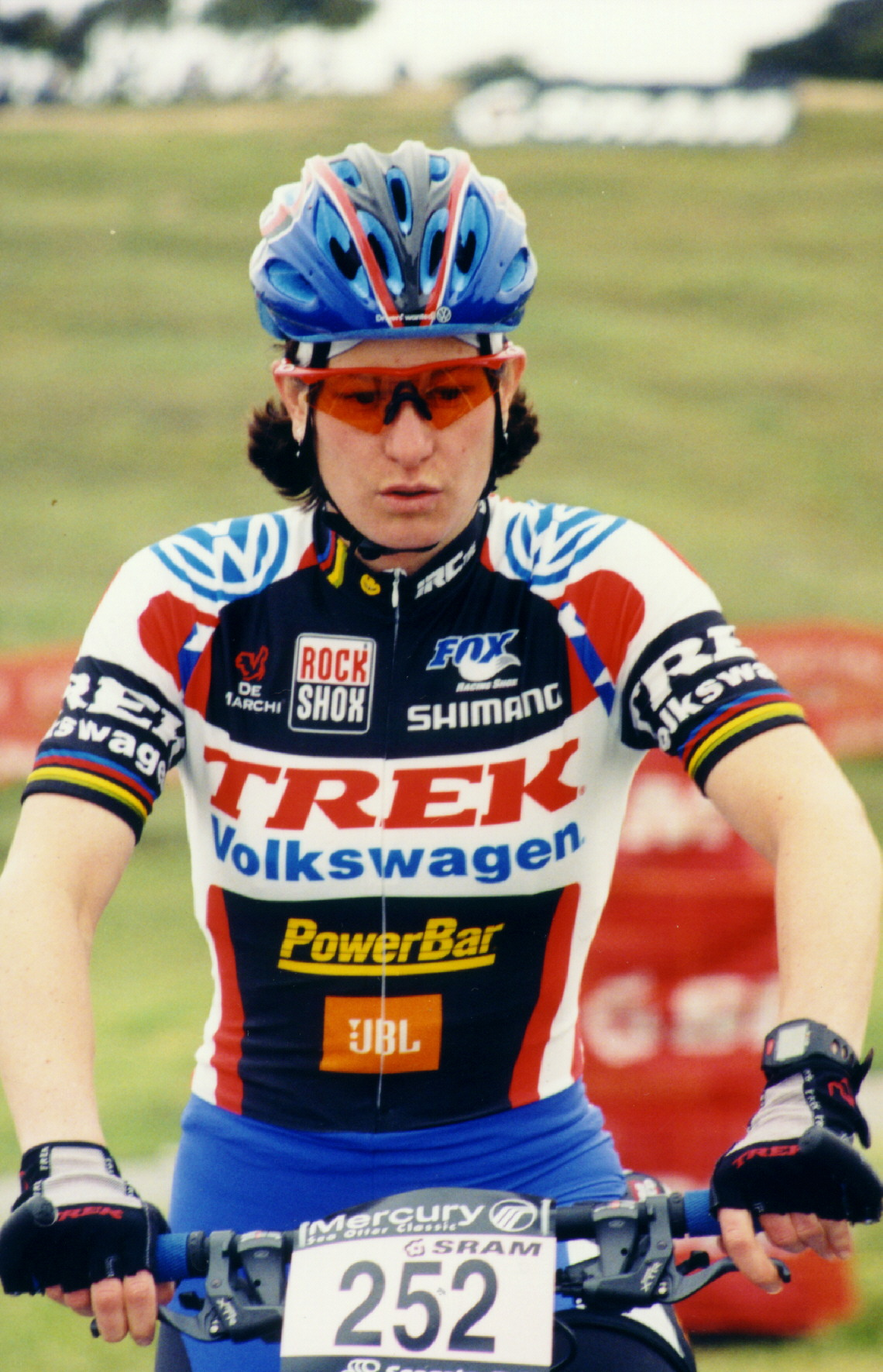
- Ruthie Matthes at the 2001 Sea Otter Classic

Personal information
- Full name: Ruthie Matthes
- Born: November 11, 1965 (age 60) United States

Cycling career
- Sport: Cycling
- Disciplines: Road & MTB
- Role: Rider
Medal record
Women’s Cycling
Representing United States
UCI Road World Championships
Silver medal – second place	1990	Road race
Mountain Bike World Championships
Bronze medal – third place	1990	Cross Country
Gold medal – first place	1991	Cross Country
Bronze medal – third place	1992	Cross Country
Bronze medal – third place	1993	Cross Country

Ruthie Matthes (born November 11, 1965) is an American professional bicycle racer who won the World Cross-Country Mountain Bike Championship in 1991. She is also a road cyclist, having twice finished in 2nd place in the Women's Challenge bicycle stage race. Ruthie is one of a series of professional riders who got their start in cycling through the Red Zinger Mini Classics youth bicycle race series in Colorado. She competed for the United States at the 2000 Summer Olympics.
