= Red Zinger Bicycle Classic =

Sports event

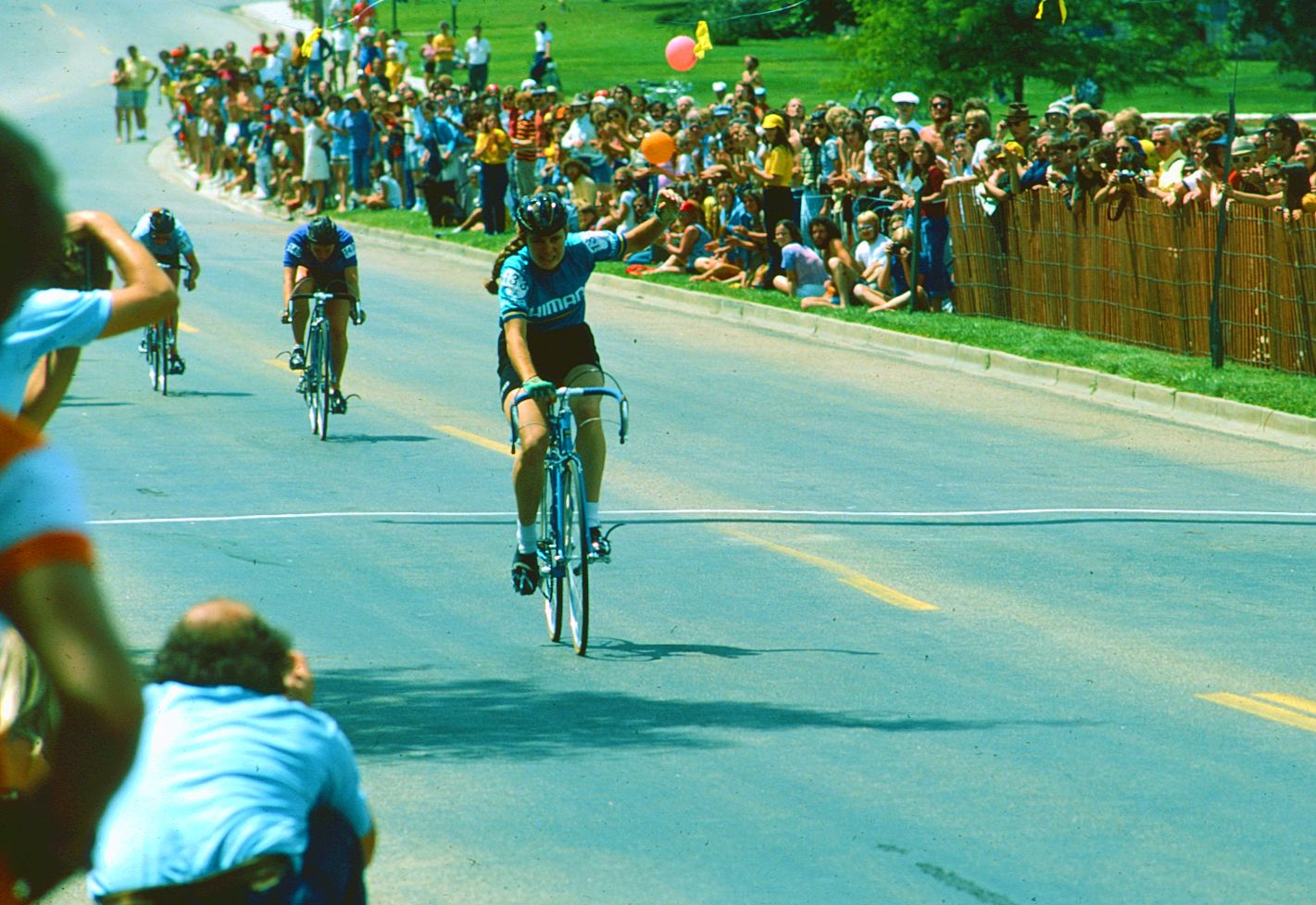
Hannah North winning the criterium stage of the 1975 Red Zinger Bicycle Classic. This win secured her first-place finish for the whole stage race.

The Red Zinger Bicycle Classic (1975–1979) was a road bicycle racing stage race.

== History ==
In 1975, Mo Siegel and John and Wyck Hay, founders of the Celestial Seasonings herbal tea company, launched the Red Zinger Bicycle Classic race to promote alternative transportation in the Greater Boulder area, particularly bike lanes, bike paths, and community awareness. The Classic was named after their popular Red Zinger tea.

In 1979, Michael Aisner, the race's then PR director, bought the race for one dollar from Siegel, and with his blessing took the idea of a grander event to Peter Coors, the beer impresario. Over the next 8 years, the Coors International Bicycle Classic grew into two weeks of racing in California, Nevada and Colorado, with stages in some years in Hawaii and Wyoming.

From 1981 to 1992 a youth bicycling series called the Red Zinger Mini Classics was held in Colorado, its name inspired by the original Red Zinger Bicycle Classic, inspiring a generation of young cyclists to enter the sport.

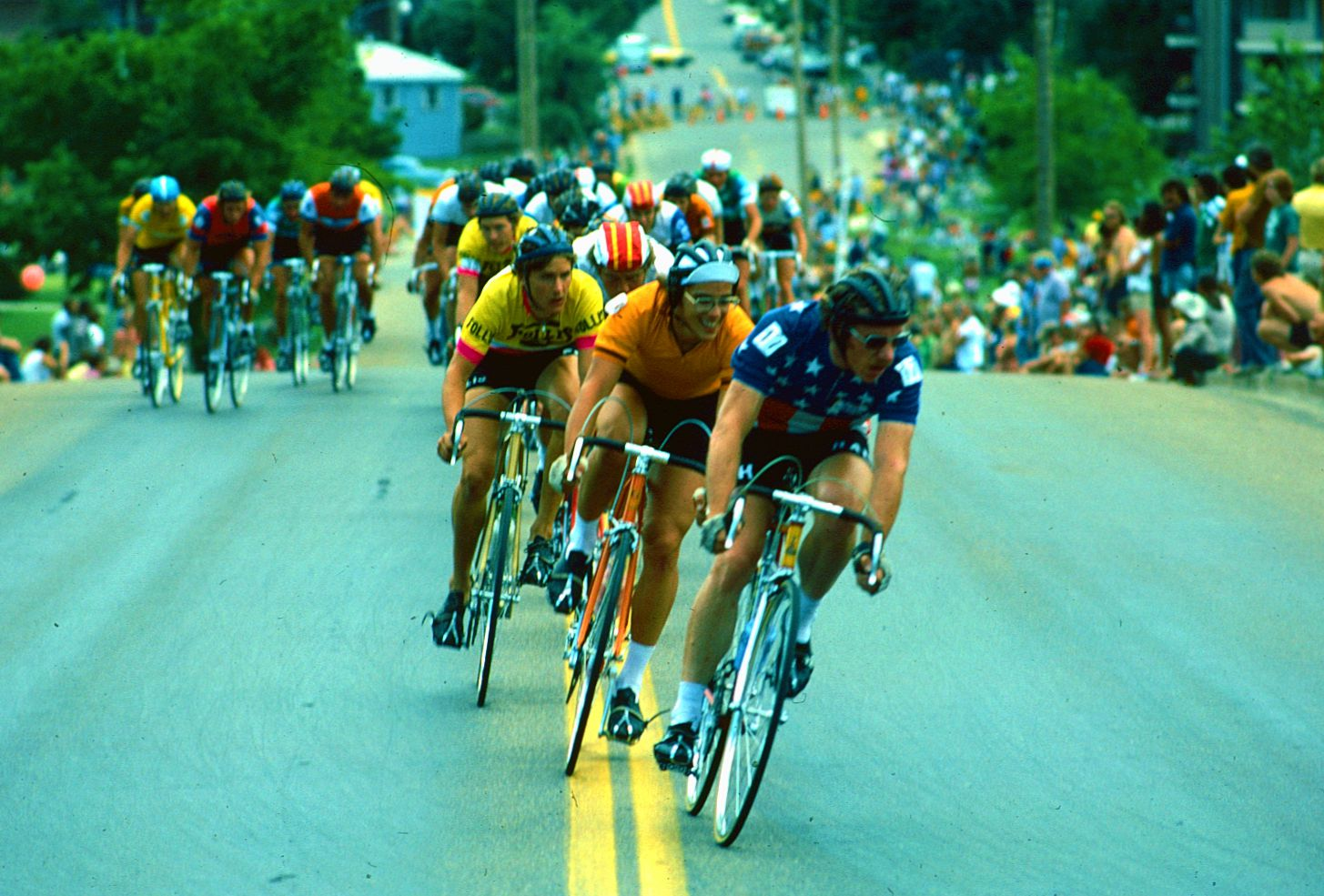
Racing action in the criterium stage of the first edition of the Red Zinger Bicycle Classic in 1975. This lead group includes the cyclists who would go on to win all five editions of the stage race. Following John Allis (in the stars-and-stripes national champion jersey) are George Mount, Dale Stetina, John Howard (who won the stage race in 1975) and Wayne Stetina. None of these competitors ended up winning this day's stage; it was won by Ron Skarin.

== Winners ==
- 1975 - John Howard United States, Hannah North United States
- 1976 - John Howard United States, (no women's division)
- 1977 - Wayne Stetina United States, Connie Carpenter United States
- 1978 - George Mount United States, Keetie van Oosten-Hage Netherlands
- 1979 - Dale Stetina United States, Keetie van Oosten-Hage Netherlands
