= Celestial Seasonings =

American tea company

- Type: Subsidiary
- Industry: Tea
- Founded: 1969; 57 years ago
- Headquarters: Boulder, Colorado
- Products: Herbal tea
- Parent: Hain Celestial Group
- Website: celestialseasonings.com

Celestial Seasonings is an American tea company based in Boulder, Colorado, United States. The company specializes in herbal teas but also sells green, white, black, and chai teas. Founded in 1969, it is a subsidiary of Hain Celestial Group.

== History ==
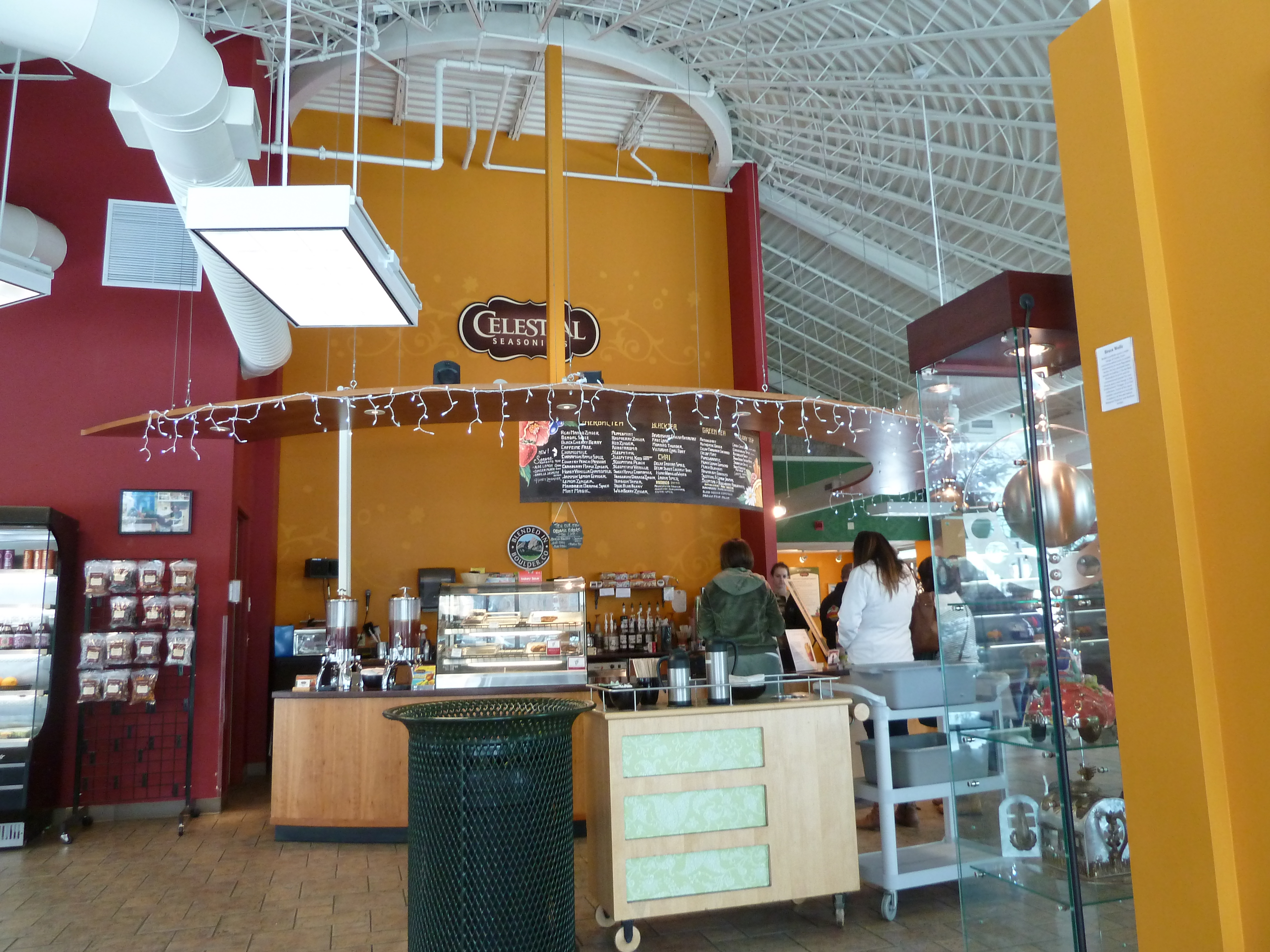
Celestial Seasonings tasting room

=== Early history ===
Celestial Seasonings has origins dating back to 1969 when co-founders Mo Siegel and Wyck Hay gathered wild herbs in the area of the Rocky Mountains and used them to make herbal teas. The tea was then packaged and sold to local health food stores with the help of wives and friends. The first tea blends were called Mo's 36 Herb Tea and Mo's 24 Herb Tea, which Siegel, his wife, and friends sold out of the back of a car while traveling across the United States. Additional blends were created and the company Celestial Seasonings was formed, becoming an American tea company that offers herbal tea blends. In January 1972, Red Zinger Herb Tea was introduced.

In the 1970s, Celestial Seasonings also created and sponsored the Red Zinger Bicycle Classic race in Colorado. In 1972, it introduced Sleepytime, its bestselling tea.

By 1999, Celestial Seasonings had moved from an old barn outside of Boulder to a corporate facility on Sleepytime Drive.

=== 1983–1999; purchase and sale by Kraft ===
Celestial Seasonings went public in 1983, but withdrew its public offering after a product recall. The following year it was purchased by Kraft Foods. By 1983, it had sales of $27 million in its first year and was responsible for 40 percent of the herbal tea business. Siegel retired in 1986, and the next year, Kraft announced they would sell Celestial Seasonings to Lipton. Bigelow successfully sued to stop the sale based on antitrust laws. Kraft then sold Celestial to Vestar Capital Partners in 1988.

In 1990, Celestial Seasonings moved into new headquarters in a custom-designed facility in North Boulder. Siegel returned in 1991 to serve as its chairman and CEO. The company introduced a green tea line in 1995, the first to be sold in mainstream stores in the United States.

=== 2000–present; Hain Celestial Group merger ===
Celestial Seasonings merged with natural food company the Hain Food Group in 2000 to form the Hain Celestial Group. The same year it introduced a chai tea line. Siegel retired for the second time in 2002. The following year it released cool brew iced tea and rooibos tea lines.

Hain Celestial Group was one of 25 companies named in a 2013 class action lawsuit over allegations of mislabeling its products (which included Celestial Seasonings) under California law. The company reached a settlement in 2015, paying $7.5 million in compensation with an additional $2.4 million worth of coupons to consumers.

By 2019, Celestial had over 100 varieties of teas and accounted for 5 percent of Hain Celestial Group's net sales.

== Products ==
Celestial Seasonings manufactures and sells herbal and other varieties of tea. The company's teas are branded using animals, including an anthropomorphic bear, Reginald, for the Sleepytime range.

== Trivia ==
The company's co-founder Mo Siegel was the grandfather of musician Camryn Magness (1999–2025).

== Mo Siegel ==
In 1967, Siegel spent two years living and attending school at a Catholic monastery. In 1969, Siegel began reading The Urantia Book. Since 1972, Siegel has hosted a Urantia Book study group. Since 1998, Siegel has been a Urantia Foundation trustee. As late as 2024, Mo Siegel became the President of the Urantia Foundation.

In 1989, Jennifer Cooke married Mo Siegel. Siegel lives with his wife, Jennifer, in the Boulder, Colorado area. He is a father of five and grandfather of seven.

== Works ==
- Siegel, Mo; Burke, Nancy (1999). Herbs for Health and Happiness: All You Need to Know. Time-Life Books. ISBN 978-0-7370-0051-1.
- Siegel, Mo (May 1997). Celestial Seasonings: Cookings. Random House Value Publishing. ISBN 978-0-517-17375-6.
- Siegel, Jennifer; Siegel, Mo; Simon, Jordan (1996). Cooking with Tea: Cookbook. Park Lane Press. ISBN 978-0-517-20014-8.
