= George Mount =

American cyclist (born 1955)

Personal information
- Full name: George Lewis Mount
- Nickname: Smilin George
- Born: September 14, 1955 (age 71) Princeton, New Jersey, United States

Cycling career
- Sport: Cycling
- Role: Rider

Professional team
- 1980–1982: San Giacomo–Benotto
- 1983: 7-Eleven

Major wins
- 1978 - Tour of Colorado (Coors Classic); 1979 - Pan American Games - Gold medal 200+ races in USA, Europe, and South America

George Lewis Mount (born September 14, 1955) is an American Olympic and professional cyclist. Mount was sixth at the 1976 Montreal Olympics road race and later with the 1980 Olympic boycott looming launched a professional career and propelled the US into post-war international cycling. (Note: American riders were among the world's best at the end of the 19th and the start of the 20th century, but they rode on the track. A handful of Americans rode on the road before and after the second world war but Mount was the first to come to international attention.)

Mount raced professionally in the US and Europe, the first American to break into European road racing. In 1997 Mount was inducted to the United States Bicycling Hall of Fame. He earned the nickname "Smilin' George".

== Races ==
George Mount on right (1981)

Mount was born in Princeton, New Jersey in 1955. He refused to register for the draft (conscription had already ended) and his father told him to leave home. He met Berkeley, California cycling enthusiast and race promoter, Peter Rich. Mount moved into a room above Rich's bicycle shop and worked for him as a mechanic. Rich called him

... a cocky pop-off, a pleasant smart aleck. But he obviously had great potential, great pedaling form. He had a powerful smoothness about him. He would pedal without wasting energy."

Peter Rich coached Mount and previously another youth, Mike Neel.

Mount began racing in 1973 as a junior and competed in about 15 events. In 1974 he won two local races, Mount Hamilton and Mount Tamalpais and competed in many as a category-one racer. In 1975, Mount said,

"I started winning a lot of bike races. I won a whole lot of races in a row - for a couple of months in 1975, nobody beat me in a bike race, whether it was a criterium, a road race, a time trial. I mean, I won a whole lot of races."

— George Mount, 1997

He rode with the Pan American Games team in Mexico City and in 1976, with Neel, the Olympic Games in Montreal, Quebec, Canada. He finished sixth to Bernt Johansson of Sweden. No American had finished in the top 60 since 1912. The historian Peter Nye said:

For the first time in memory, Mount made the prospect of an Olympic cycling medal a distinct possibility."

Mount won a gold medal in the Pan American Games in 1979 and was a favorite for the 1980 Olympics in Moscow.

In 1977 Mount moved to Castelfranco di Sopra in Italy - Neel had already gone there and he arranged an introduction - and competed for a small club team winning a number major races. Being a foreign rider at the time he was only allowed to enter bigger races categorized for international competitions. Mount said:

"Neel was racing for the Pro team Magniflex in Italy and he said to someone 'Hey, I know this kid in the States who could come over and kick all your guys' butts' and in the end the manager said 'Well, you better get him over' and I went over and I got lucky and started winning as an amateur."

The choice of Italy was easy because he'd read Eddy Merckx's advice. Mount remembered:

"He [Merckx] said if you want to win races, go to France; if you want to learn about bike racing, go to Italy."

In 1978 he raced for the US national team for most of the season in Europe, winning major races and respect. He came fourth in the Tour of Britain, known as the Milk Race, and won the Red Zinger Bicycle Classic later known as the Tour of Colorado. Peter Nye wrote:

"In major European events, the powerful Mount was often at the head of the pack... In 1979 while leading another US National team through a series of races mostly in France he won a stage of France's pro-am Circuit de la Sarthe and finished first in the Tour de l'Auvergne. Under revised rules governing amateurs, he won $4,000 when he captured the Apple Lap, the 75-mile race through New York City's five boroughs, and set a national record for 75 miles on the way."

Mount raced most of that season in Europe and became the first American in modern history to win a professional/open race, turning professional because the USA decided against sending a team to the Moscow Olympics. He joined an Italian team, San Giacomo/Benotto which included members such as Freddy Maertens, Roberto Visentini, and Moreno Argentin. He raced in Italy for three years, finished the Tour of Italy in 20th and 25th places and rode many of the classics. After three years of riding for his team leaders, despite an offer for another team the following year, he was burned out. He said:

"I wanted to go home. I also was 28 years old. I thought, 'Could race another five years, and I could be a mid-30s burnt-out bike racer working in a bike shop. Or I could go back into the United States and get something going; either work or get back into school.' When I was 15 years old, my goal was the gran esperienza- the big experience. To be able to be a pro bike racer in Europe was the goal. And I did it. I did it the hard way. And I did it before anybody else in this country did it. But most importantly I did it. I actually got to be in bike races with guys who were my big heroes. Sometimes I beat them, sometimes they beat me. But I did it."

— George Mount. 1997

== Legacy ==
Mount won more than 200 races, in the US, Europe, and South America. He competed in five world championships on the road, and won national and district titles and medals on road and track. He held numerous records, including national distance records, which stood for years. San Francisco Weekly said:

"George Mount's accomplishments helped start the craze, returning the country to the bicycling dignity it enjoyed during the 1890s, 1910s, and 1920s, when bike-crazy Americans first embraced modernity, and when it seemed this country's ethos of optimism would become a driving force for all the world."

He now lives in Grants Pass, Oregon and is married with two daughters. He is active on the board of the US Bicycling Hall of Fame. The San Francisco Weekly said:

"Navigating among the couches and highchairs, potted plants and baby toys that clutter his Redwood City tract house, George Mount doesn't strike one at first as the champion of an epoch. His severe visage has softened over the years; he's lost a bike racer's gauntness. The delight he takes in talking about his 10-month-old daughter, Eleanor, or his wife, Caryne, doesn't much resemble the delight a racer takes in making an opponent suffer climbing up a hill."
