= United States at the UCI Road World Championships =

- IOC code: USA
- Medals: Gold 0 Silver 0 Bronze 0 Total 0

United States at the UCI Road World Championships is an overview of the American results at the UCI Road World Championships and UCI Junior Road World Championships.

== List of medalists ==
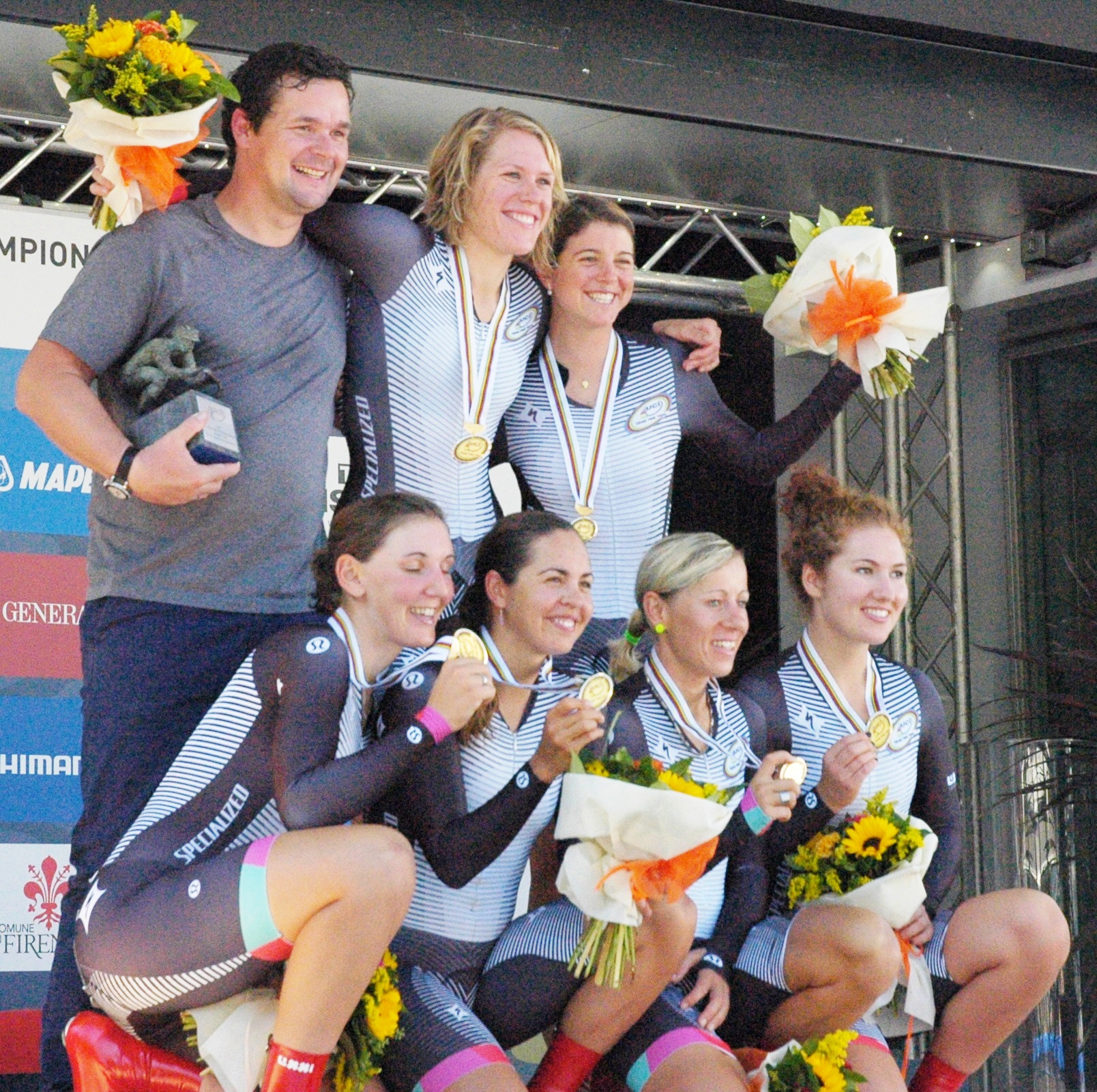
Specialized–lululemon won the women's team time trial in 2013.

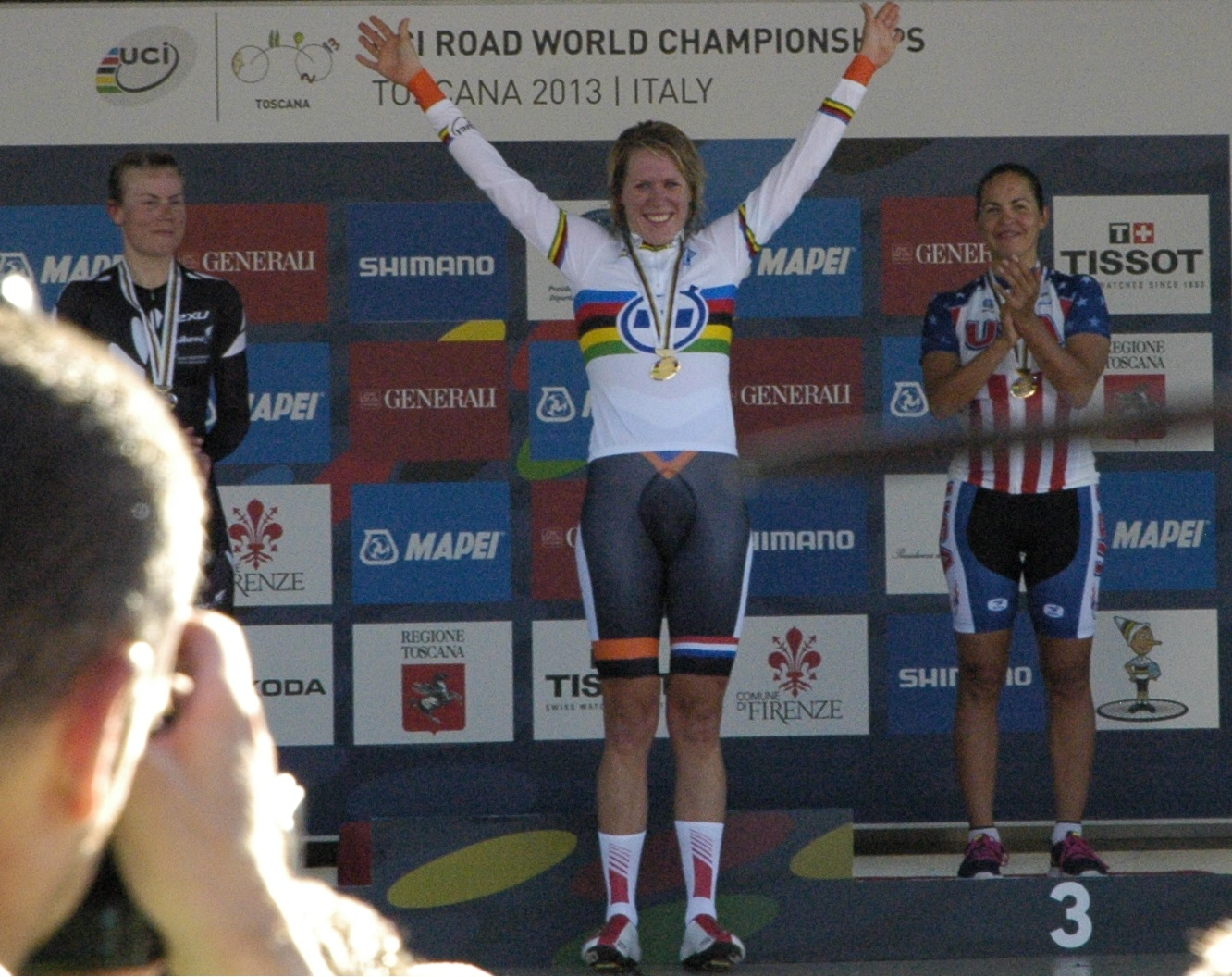
Carmen Small (right) finished third in the women's time trial in 2013 (Ellen van Dijk won gold and Linda Villumsen silver).

This is a list of elite, under-23 American medals, but don't list the amateur events. Since the 2012 UCI Road World Championships there is the men's and women's team time trial event for trade teams and these medals are included under the UCI registration country of the team.

Medal	Championship	Name	Event
Gold	(Belgium) 1969 Zolder	Audrey McElmury (USA)	Women's road race
Silver	(Venezuela) 1977 San Cristóbal	Connie Carpenter (USA)	Women's road race
Gold	(Argentina) 1979 Buenos Aires	Greg LeMond (USA)	Men's junior road race
Gold	(France) 1980 Sallanches	Beth Heiden (USA)	Women's road race
Bronze	(Czech Republic) 1981 Prague	Connie Carpenter (USA)	Women's road race
Silver	(United Kingdom) 1982 Goodwood	Greg LeMond (USA)	Men's road race
Silver	(Switzerland) 1983 Altenrhein	Rebecca Twigg (USA)	Women's road race
Gold	(Switzerland) 1983 Altenrhein	Greg LeMond (USA)	Men's road race
Silver	(Italy) 1985 Giavera del Montello	Greg LeMond (USA)	Men's road race
Silver	(United States) 1986 Colorado Springs	Janelle Parks (USA)	Women's road race
Silver	(Austria) 1987 Villach	United States; Inga Thompson; Sue Ehlers; Jane Marshall; Leslie Schenk	Women's team time trial
Bronze	(France) 1988 Ronse	United States; Jeannie Golay; Phyllis Hines; Jane Marshall; Leslie Schenk	Women's team time trial
Gold	(France) 1989 Chambéry	Greg LeMond (USA)	Men's road race
Gold	(Russia) 1989 Moscow	Deirdre Demet-Barry (USA)	Women's junior road race
Silver	(Russia) 1989 Moscow	Jessica Grieco (USA)	Women's junior road race
Silver	(Japan) 1990 Utsunomiya	United States; Inga Thompson; Eve Stephenson; Phyllis Hines; Maureen Manley	Women's team time trial
Silver	(Japan) 1990 Utsunomiya	Ruthie Matthes (USA)	Women's road race
Silver	(United Kingdom) 1990 Middlesborough	Jessica Grieco (USA)	Women's junior road race
Silver	(Germany) 1991 Stuttgart	Inga Thompson (USA)	Women's road race
Gold	(United States) 1991 Colorado Springs	Jeff Evanshine (USA)	Men's junior road race
Gold	(Spain) 1992 Benidorm	United States; Eve Stephenson; Jeannie Golay; Jan Bolland; Danute Bankaitis-Davis	Women's team time trial
Gold	(Norway) 1993 Oslo	Lance Armstrong (USA)	Men's road race
Silver	(Norway) 1993 Oslo	United States; Deirdre Demet-Barry; Eve Stephenson; Jeannie Golay; Janice Bolland	Women's team time trial
Bronze	(Norway) 1993 Oslo	Laura Charameda (USA)	Women's road race
Silver	(Australia) 1993 Perth	Mariano Friedick (USA)	Men's junior road race
Gold	(Argentina) 1994 Agrigento	Karen Kurreck (USA)	Women's time trial
Bronze	(Argentina) 1994 Agrigento	Jeanne Golay (USA)	Women's road race
Bronze	(Argentina) 1994 Agrigento	United States; Deirdre Demet-Barry; Eve Stephenson; Jeannie Golay; Alison Dunlap	Women's team time trial
Silver	(Ecuador) 1994 Quito	Heath Sandall (USA)	Men's junior time trial
Gold	(France) 2000 Plouay	Mari Holden (USA)	Women's time trial
Gold	(Portugal) 2001 Lisbon	Danny Pate (USA)	Men's under-23 time trial
Silver	(Italy) 2004 Verona	Rebecca Much (USA)	Women's junior time trial
Bronze	(Spain) 2005 Madrid	Kristin Armstrong (USA)	Women's time trial
Gold	(Austria) 2006 Salzburg	Kristin Armstrong (USA)	Women's time trial
Silver	(Austria) 2006 Salzburg	David Zabriskie (USA)	Men's time trial
Bronze	(Austria) 2006 Salzburg	Christine Thorburn (USA)	Women's time trial
Silver	(Germany) 2007 Stuttgart	Kristin Armstrong (USA)	Women's time trial
Gold	(Mexico) 2007 Aguascalientes	Taylor Phinney (USA)	Men's junior time trial
Bronze	(Mexico) 2007 Aguascalientes	Jerika Hutchinson (USA)	Women's junior time trial
Gold	(Italy) 2008 Varese	Amber Neben (USA)	Women's time trial
Bronze	(Italy) 2008 Varese	David Zabriskie (USA)	Men's time trial
Bronze	(South Africa) 2008 Cape Town	Taylor Phinney (USA)	Men's junior time trial
Gold	(Switzerland) 2009 Mendrisio	Kristin Armstrong (USA)	Women's time trial
Silver	(Russia) 2009 Moscow	Lawson Craddock (USA)	Men's junior time trial
Gold	(Australia) 2010 Geelong	Taylor Phinney (USA)	Men's under-23 time trial
Bronze	(Australia) 2010 Geelong	Taylor Phinney (USA)	Men's under-23 road race
Bronze	(Italy) 2010 Offida	Lawson Craddock (USA)	Men's junior time trial
Bronze	(Italy) 2010 Offida	Coryn Rivera (USA)	Women's junior road race
Silver	(Netherlands) 2012 Limburg	Taylor Phinney (USA)	Men's time trial
Silver	(Netherlands) 2012 Limburg	Evelyn Stevens (USA)	Women's time trial
Silver	(Netherlands) 2012 Limburg	(United States) BMC Racing Team; Alessandro Ballan (ITA); Philippe Gilbert (BEL); Taylor Phinney (USA); Marco Pinotti (ITA); Manuel Quinziato (ITA); Tejay van Garderen (USA)	Men's team time trial
Gold	(Italy) 2013 Tuscany	(United States) Specialized–lululemon; Lisa Brennauer (GER); Katie Colclough (GBR); Carmen Small (USA); Evelyn Stevens (USA); Ellen van Dijk (NED); Trixi Worrack (GER)	Women's team time trial
Bronze	(Italy) 2013 Tuscany	Carmen Small (USA)	Women's time trial
Bronze	(Italy) 2013 Tuscany	Zeke Mostov (USA)	Men's junior time trial
Gold	(Spain) 2014 Ponferrada	(United States) BMC Racing Team; Rohan Dennis (AUS); Silvan Dillier (SUI); Daniel Oss (ITA); Manuel Quinziato (ITA); Tejay van Garderen (USA); Peter Velits (SVK)	Men's team time trial
Gold	(Spain) 2014 Ponferrada	(United States) Specialized–lululemon; Chantal Blaak (NED); Lisa Brennauer (DEU); Karol-Ann Canuel (CAN); Carmen Small (USA); Evelyn Stevens (USA); Trixi Worrack (DEU)	Women's team time trial
Silver	(Spain) 2014 Ponferrada	Adrien Costa (USA)	Men's junior time trial
Bronze	(Spain) 2014 Ponferrada	Evelyn Stevens (USA)	Women's time trial
Gold	(United States) 2015 Richmond	(United States) BMC Racing Team; Rohan Dennis (AUS); Silvan Dillier (SUI); Stefan Küng (SUI); Daniel Oss (ITA); Taylor Phinney (USA); Manuel Quinziato (ITA)	Men's team time trial
Gold	(United States) 2015 Richmond	Chloé Dygert (USA)	Women's junior road race
Gold	(United States) 2015 Richmond	Chloé Dygert (USA)	Women's junior time trial
Silver	(United States) 2015 Richmond	Emma White (USA)	Women's junior time trial
Silver	(United States) 2015 Richmond	Emma White (USA)	Women's junior road race
Silver	(United States) 2015 Richmond	Adrien Costa (USA)	Men's junior time trial
Bronze	(United States) 2015 Richmond	Megan Guarnier (USA)	Women's road race
Bronze	(United States) 2015 Richmond	Brandon McNulty (USA)	Men's junior time trial
Gold	(Qatar) 2016 Doha	Brandon McNulty (USA)	Men's junior time trial
Gold	(Qatar) 2016 Doha	Amber Neben (USA)	Women's time trial
Silver	(Qatar) 2016 Doha	(United States) BMC Racing Team; Rohan Dennis (AUS); Stefan Küng (SUI); Daniel Oss (ITA); Taylor Phinney (USA); Manuel Quinziato (ITA); Joey Rosskopf (USA)	Men's team time trial
Silver	(Qatar) 2016 Doha	Skylar Schneider (USA)	Women's junior road race
Bronze	(Qatar) 2016 Doha	Ian Garrison (USA)	Men's junior time trial
Silver	(Norway) 2017 Bergen	(United States) BMC Racing Team; Rohan Dennis (AUS); Silvan Dillier (SUI); Stefan Küng (SUI); Daniel Oss (ITA); Miles Scotson (AUS); Tejay van Garderen (USA)	Men's team time trial
Silver	(Norway) 2017 Bergen	Brandon McNulty (USA)	Men's under-23 time trial
Bronze	(Austria) 2018 Innsbruck	(United States) BMC Racing Team; Patrick Bevin (NZL); Damiano Caruso (ITA); Rohan Dennis (AUS); Stefan Küng (SUI); Greg Van Avermaet (BEL); Tejay van Garderen (USA)	Men's team time trial
Gold	(United Kingdom) 2019 Harrogate	Chloé Dygert Owen (USA)	Women's time trial
Gold	(United Kingdom) 2019 Harrogate	Megan Jastrab (USA)	Women's junior road race
Gold	(United Kingdom) 2019 Harrogate	Quinn Simmons (USA)	Men's junior road race
Silver	(United Kingdom) 2019 Harrogate	Ian Garrison (USA)	Men's under-23 time trial
Bronze	(United Kingdom) 2019 Harrogate	Brandon McNulty (USA)	Men's under-23 time trial
Bronze	(United Kingdom) 2019 Harrogate	Magnus Sheffield (USA)	Men's junior road race

=== Other American medalists ===
From 2012 to 2018, there was the men's and women's team time trial event for trade teams and these medals are included under the UCI registration country of the team. Here are listed of the medalists who won a medal with a non-American-based team. Since 2019, these events were replaced with a single mixed team relay time trial event for national teams.

Medal	Championship	Name	Team	Event
Gold	(Netherlands) 2012 Valkenburg	Amber Neben (USA); Evelyn Stevens (USA)	(Germany) Team Specialized–lululemon	Women's team time trial
Bronze	(Spain) 2014 Ponferrada	Alison Tetrick (USA)	(Italy) Astana BePink	Women's team time trial
Gold	(Qatar) 2016 Doha	Evelyn Stevens (USA)	(Netherlands) Boels–Dolmans	Women's team time trial
Gold	(Norway) 2017 Bergen	Coryn Rivera (USA)	(Netherlands) Team Sunweb	Women's team time trial
Silver	(Norway) 2017 Bergen	Megan Guarnier (USA)	(Netherlands) Boels–Dolmans	Women's team time trial
Silver	(Austria) 2018 Innsbruck	Chad Haga (USA)	(Netherlands) Team Sunweb	Men's team time trial
Bronze	(Austria) 2018 Innsbruck	Coryn Rivera (USA)	(Netherlands) Team Sunweb	Women's team time trial

== Most successful American competitors ==
The list don't include the men's amateur events

Name	Medals	Championships
Greg LeMond	3 gold, 2 silver, 0 bronze	(gold) 1979 Buenos Aires – Men's junior road race (gold) 1983 Altenrhein – Men's road race (gold) 1989 Chambéry – Men's road race (silver) 1982 Goodwood – Men's road race (silver) 1985 Giavera del Montello – Men's road race
Taylor Phinney	2 gold, 1 silver, 2 bronze	(gold) 2007 Aguascalientes – Men's junior time trial (gold) 2010 Geelong – Men's under-23 time trial (silver) 2012 Limburg – Men's team time trial (bronze) 2008 Cape Town – Men's junior time trial (bronze) 2010 Geelong – Men's under-23 road race
Kristin Armstrong	2 gold, 1 silver, 1 bronze	(gold) 2006 Salzburg – Women's time trial (gold) 2009 Mendrisio – Women's time trial (silver) 2007 Stuttgart – Women's time trial (bronze) 2005 Madrid – Women's time trial
Amber Neben	2 gold, 0 silver, 0 bronze	(gold) 2008 Varese – Women's time trial (gold) 2012 Limburg – Women's team time trial

== Medal table ==
=== Medals by year ===
The list don't include the men's amateur events

Championship	Gold	Silver	Bronze	Total	Rank
(Belgium) 1969 Zolder	1	0	0	1	
(Venezuela) 1977 San Cristóbal	0	1	0	1	
(Argentina) 1979 Buenos Aires	1	0	0	1	
(France) 1980 Sallanches	1	0	0	1	
(Czech Republic) 1981 Prague	0	0	1	1	
(United Kingdom) 1982 Goodwood	0	1	0	1	
(Switzerland) 1983 Altenrhein	1	1	0	2	
(Italy) 1985 Giavera del Montello	0	1	0	1	
(United States) 1986 Colorado Springs	0	1	0	1	
(Austria) 1987 Villach	0	1	0	1	
(France) 1988 Ronse	0	0	1	1	
(France) 1989 Chambéry	1	0	0	1	
(Russia) 1989 Moscow	1	1	0	2	
(Japan) 1990 Utsunomiya	0	2	0	2	
(United Kingdom) 1990 Middelsborough	0	1	0	1	
(Germany) 1991 Stuttgart	0	1	0	1	
(United States) 1991 Colorado Springs	1	0	0	1	
(Spain) 1992 Benidorm	1	0	0	1	
(Norway) 1993 Oslo	1	1	1	3	
(Australia) 1993 Perth	0	1	0	1	
(Argentina) 1994 Agrigento	1	0	2	3	
(Ecuador) 1994 Quito	0	1	0	1	
(France) 2000 Plouay	1	0	0	1	
(Portugal) 2001 Lisbon	1	0	0	1	
(Italy) 2004 Verona	0	1	0	1	
(Spain) 2005 Madrid	0	0	1	1	
(Austria) 2006 Salzburg	1	1	1	3	
(Germany) 2007 Stuttgart	0	1	0	1	
(Mexico) 2007 Aguascalientes	1	0	1	2	
(Italy) 2008 Varese	1	0	1	2	
(South Africa) 2008 Cape Town	0	0	1	1	
(Switzerland) 2009 Mendrisio	1	0	0	1	
(Russia) 2009 Moscow	0	1	0	1	
(Australia) 2010 Geelong	1	0	1	2	
(Italy) 2010 Offida	0	0	2	2	
(Netherlands) 2012 Limburg	0	3	0	3	
(Italy) 2013 Tuscany	1	0	2	3	6
(Spain) 2014 Ponferrada	2	1	1	4	3

=== Medals by discipline ===
Updated during the 2015 UCI Road World Championships after 27 September

Event	Gold	Silver	Bronze	Total	Rank
Men's road race	3	2	0	5	
Men's time trial	0	2	1	3	
Men's team time trial	1	1	0	2	
Women's road race	2	5	4	11	
Women's time trial	5	2	4	11	
Women's team time trial	4	3	2	9	
Men's under-23 road race	0	0	1	1	
Men's under-23 time trial	2	0	0	2	
Men's junior road race	2	1	0	3	
Men's junior time trial	1	4	4	9	
Women's junior road race	2	3	1	6	
Women's junior time trial	1	2	1	4	
Total	21	25	16	59	
