= UCI Road World Championships – Women's team time trial =

Race details
- Date: End of season
- Discipline: Team time trial
- Type: One-day
- Organiser: UCI

History
- First edition: 1987
- Editions: 15
- Final edition: 2018
- First winner: Soviet Union
- Most wins: Russia; Velocio–SRAM Pro Cycling (4 wins)
- Final winner: Canyon//SRAM

The UCI Road World Championships – Women's team time trial was a world championship for road bicycle racing in the discipline of team time trial. It was organized by the world governing body, the Union Cycliste Internationale (UCI).

The national teams had 4 riders per team. The team time trial for trade teams was introduced in 2012 and had 6 riders per team. The mixed team relay replaced the men's and women's team time trial events at the world championships from 2019.

== National teams (1987–94) ==
A championship for women's national teams was introduced in 1987 and held annually until 1994. There were 4 riders per team.

=== Medal winners ===
Championships	Gold	Silver	Bronze
1987 Villach	Soviet Union; Nadezhda Kibardina; Alla Jakovleva; Tamara Poliakova; Lyubov Pugovichnikova	United States; Inga Thompson; Sue Ehlers; Jane Marshall; Leslie Schenk	Italy; Francesca Galli; Roberta Bonanomi; Imelda Chiappa; Monica Bandini
1988 Ronse	Italy; Monica Bandini; Roberta Bonanomi; Maria Canins; Francesca Galli	Soviet Union; Alla Jakovleva; Nadezhda Kibardina; Svetlana Rozhkova; Laima Zilporite	United States; Jeannie Golay; Phyllis Hines; Jane Marshall; Leslie Schenk
1989 Chambéry	Soviet Union; Nadezhda Kibardina; Tamara Poliakova; Laima Zilporite; Natalya Melyokhina	Italy; Monica Bandini; Roberta Bonanomi; Maria Canins; Francesca Galli	France; Valérie Simmonnet; Cécile Odin; Catherine Marsal; Nathalie Cantet
1990 Utsunomiya	Netherlands; Leontien van Moorsel; Monique Knol; Cora Westland; Astrid Schop	United States; Inga Thompson; Eve Stephenson; Phyllis Hines; Maureen Manley	Soviet Union; Natalya Melyokhina; Nadezhda Kibardina; Valentina Polkhanova; Natalia Chipaeva
1991 Stuttgart	France; Marion Clignet; Nathalie Gendron; Cécile Odin; Catherine Marsal	Netherlands; Monique de Bruin; Monique Knol; Astrid Schop; Cora Westland	Soviet Union; Natalya Grinina; Nadezhda Kibardina; Valentina Polkhanova; Aiga Zagorska
1992 Benidorm	United States; Bunki Bankaitis-Davis; Eve Stephenson; Janice Bolland; Jeannie Golay	France; Jeannie Longo; Corinne Legal; Catherine Marsal; Cécile Odin	Russia; Nadezhda Kibardina; Natalya Grinina; Gulnara Fatkullina; Aleksandra Koliaseva
1993 Oslo	Russia; Olga Sokolova; Svetlana Boubnenkova; Aleksandra Koliaseva; Valentina Polkhanova	United States; Eve Stephenson; Jeannie Golay; Janice Bolland; Deirdre Demet	Italy; Roberta Bonanomi; Alessandra Cappellotto; Michela Fanini; Fabiana Luperini
1994 Agrigento	Russia; Olga Sokolova; Aleksandra Koliaseva; Svetlana Boubnenkova; Valentina Polkhanova	Lithuania; Rasa Polikevičiūtė; Jolanta Polikevičiūtė; Diana Žiliūtė; Luda Triabaite	United States; Deirdre Demet; Eve Stephenson; Jeannie Golay; Alison Dunlap

=== Medals by nation ===
Rank	Nation	Gold	Silver	Bronze	Total
1	Russia (RUS)	4	1	3	8
2	United States (USA)	1	3	2	6
3	Italy (ITA)	1	1	2	4
4	France (FRA)	1	1	1	3
5	Netherlands (NED)	1	1	0	2
6	Lithuania (LTU)	0	1	0	1
Totals (6 entries)		8	8	8	24

=== Most successful riders ===
Rank	Rider	Gold	Silver	Bronze	Total
1	Nadezhda Kibardina (RUS)	2	1	3	6
2	Valentina Polkhanova (RUS)	2	0	2	4
3	Aleksandra Koliaseva (RUS)	2	0	1	3
4	Svetlana Boubnenkova (RUS); Tamara Poliakova (URS); Olga Sokolova (RUS)	2	0	0	2
7	Eve Stephenson (USA)	1	2	1	4
8	Roberta Bonanomi (ITA)	1	1	2	4

== UCI teams (2012–2018) ==
There was a long break until a championship for trade teams was introduced in 2012. There were 6 riders per team. The championship was held up to 2018.

=== Medal winners ===
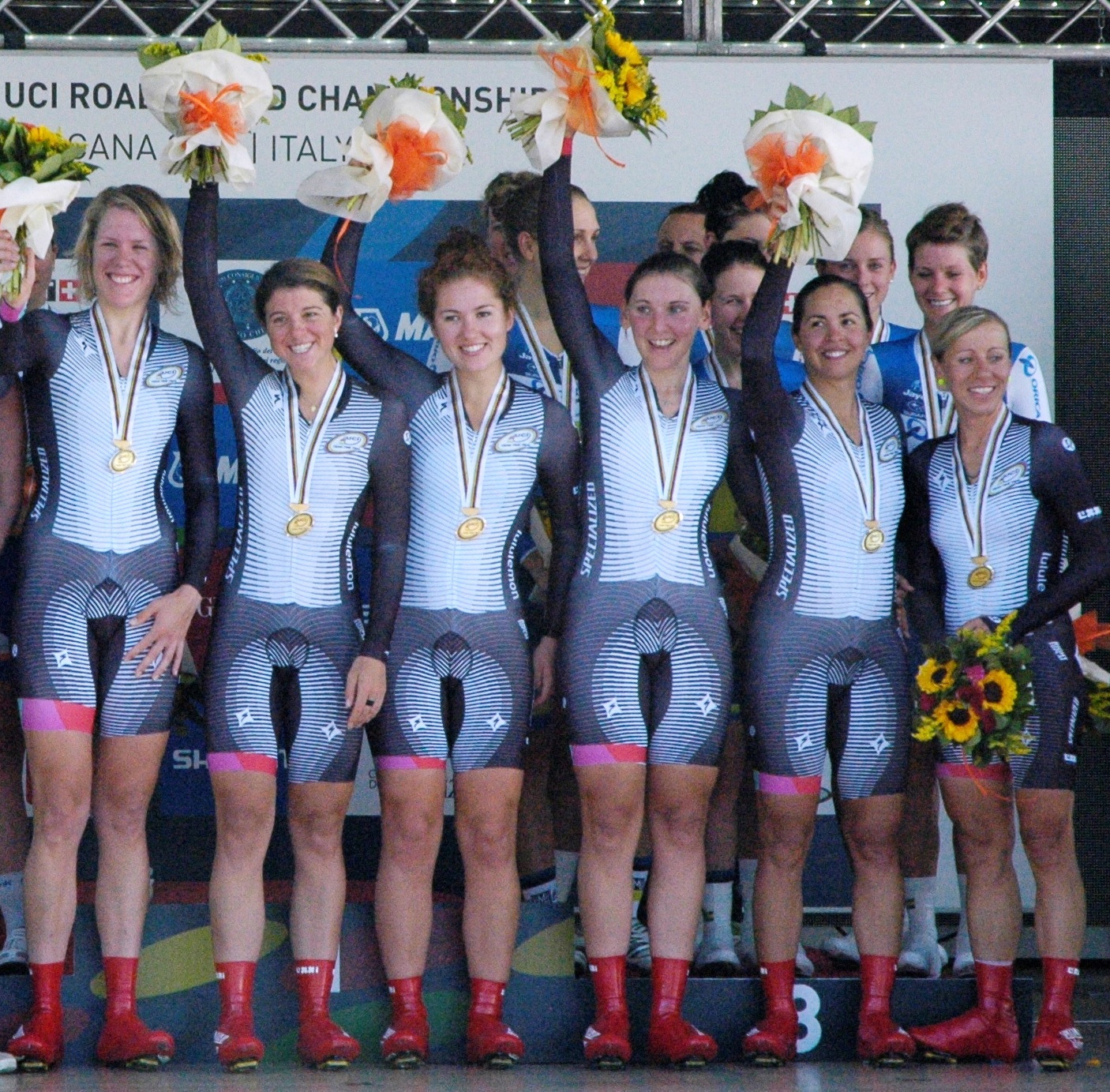
Specialized–lululemon won the world title again in 2013.

Championships	Gold	Silver	Bronze
2012 Valkenburg	(Germany) Team Specialized–lululemon	(Australia) Orica–AIS	(Netherlands) AA Drink–leontien.nl
2012 Valkenburg	Charlotte Becker (GER); Ellen van Dijk (NED); Amber Neben (USA); Evelyn Stevens (USA); Ina-Yoko Teutenberg (GER); Trixi Worrack (GER)	Judith Arndt (GER); Shara Gillow (AUS); Loes Gunnewijk (NED); Melissa Hoskins (AUS); Alex Rhodes (AUS); Linda Villumsen (NZL)	Chantal Blaak (NED); Lucinda Brand (NED); Jessie Daams (BEL); Sharon Laws (GBR); Emma Pooley (GBR); Kirsten Wild (NED)
2013 Florence	(United States) Specialized–lululemon	(Netherlands) Rabobank-Liv Giant	(Australia) Orica–AIS
2013 Florence	Lisa Brennauer (DEU); Katie Colclough (GBR); Carmen Small (USA); Evelyn Stevens (USA); Ellen van Dijk (NED); Trixi Worrack (DEU)	Lucinda Brand (NED); Thalita de Jong (NED); Pauline Ferrand-Prévot (FRA); Roxane Knetemann (NED); Annemiek van Vleuten (NED); Marianne Vos (NED)	Annette Edmondson (AUS); Shara Gillow (AUS); Loes Gunnewijk (NED); Melissa Hoskins (AUS); Emma Johansson (SWE); Amanda Spratt (AUS)
2014 Ponferrada	(United States) Specialized–lululemon	(Australia) Orica–AIS	(Italy) Astana BePink Women Team
2014 Ponferrada	Chantal Blaak (NED); Lisa Brennauer (DEU); Karol-Ann Canuel (CAN); Carmen Small (USA); Evelyn Stevens (USA); Trixi Worrack (DEU)	Annette Edmondson (AUS); Melissa Hoskins (AUS); Emma Johansson (SWE); Jessie MacLean (AUS); Valentina Scandolara (ITA); Amanda Spratt (AUS)	Alena Amialiusik (BLR); Simona Frapporti (ITA); Doris Schweizer (SUI); Alison Tetrick (USA); Silvia Valsecchi (ITA); Susanna Zorzi (ITA)
2015 Richmond	(Germany) Velocio–SRAM	(Netherlands) Boels–Dolmans	(Netherlands) Rabobank-Liv Woman Cycling Team
2015 Richmond	Alena Amialiusik (BLR); Lisa Brennauer (DEU); Karol-Ann Canuel (CAN); Barbara Guarischi (ITA); Mieke Kröger (DEU); Trixi Worrack (DEU)	Lizzie Armitstead (GBR); Chantal Blaak (NED); Christine Majerus (LUX); Katarzyna Pawłowska (POL); Evelyn Stevens (USA); Ellen van Dijk (NED)	Lucinda Brand (NED); Thalita de Jong (NED); Shara Gillow (AUS); Roxane Knetemann (NED); Katarzyna Niewiadoma (POL); Anna van der Breggen (NED)
2016 Doha	(Netherlands) Boels–Dolmans	(Germany) Canyon//SRAM	(Germany) Cervélo–Bigla Pro Cycling
2016 Doha	Chantal Blaak (NED); Karol-Ann Canuel (CAN); Lizzie Deignan (GBR); Christine Majerus (LUX); Evelyn Stevens (USA); Ellen van Dijk (NED)	Alena Amialiusik (BLR); Hannah Barnes (GBR); Lisa Brennauer (DEU); Elena Cecchini (ITA); Mieke Kröger (DEU); Trixi Worrack (DEU)	Ciara Horne (GBR); Lisa Klein (DEU); Lotta Lepistö (FIN); Ashleigh Moolman (RSA); Joëlle Numainville (CAN); Stephanie Pohl (DEU)
2017 Bergen	(Netherlands) Team Sunweb	(Netherlands) Boels–Dolmans	(Germany) Cervélo–Bigla Pro Cycling
2017 Bergen	Lucinda Brand (NED); Leah Kirchmann (CAN); Floortje Mackaij (NED); Coryn Rivera (USA); Sabrina Stultiens (NED); Ellen van Dijk (NED)	Chantal Blaak (NED); Karol-Ann Canuel (CAN); Megan Guarnier (USA); Christine Majerus (LUX); Amy Pieters (NED); Anna van der Breggen (NED)	Stephanie Gaumnitz (GER); Lisa Klein (GER); Clara Koppenburg (GER); Lotta Lepistö (FIN); Cecilie Uttrup Ludwig (DEN); Ashleigh Moolman (RSA)
2018 Innsbruck	(Germany) Canyon//SRAM	(Netherlands) Boels–Dolmans	(Netherlands) Team Sunweb
2018 Innsbruck	Alena Amialiusik (BLR); Alice Barnes (GBR); Hannah Barnes (GBR); Elena Cecchini (ITA); Lisa Klein (DEU); Trixi Worrack (DEU)	Chantal Blaak (NED); Karol-Ann Canuel (CAN); Amalie Dideriksen (DEN); Christine Majerus (LUX); Amy Pieters (NED); Anna van der Breggen (NED)	Lucinda Brand (NED); Leah Kirchmann (CAN); Liane Lippert (GER); Pernille Mathiesen (DEN); Coryn Rivera (USA); Ellen van Dijk (NED)

=== Most successful teams ===
Rank	Team	Gold	Silver	Bronze	Total
1	(Germany) Velocio–SRAM Pro Cycling	4	0	0	4
2	(Netherlands) Team SD Worx–Protime	1	3	0	4
3	(Germany) Canyon//SRAM zondacrypto	1	1	0	2
4	(Netherlands) Team Picnic–PostNL	1	0	1	2
5	(Australia) Orica–Scott	0	2	1	3
6	(Netherlands) Liv Racing TeqFind	0	1	1	2
7	(Germany) Équipe Paule Ka	0	0	2	2
8	(Netherlands) AA Drink–leontien.nl	0	0	1	1
8	(Italy) Vini Fantini–BePink	0	0	1	1

=== Most successful riders ===
Rank	Rider	Gold	Silver	Bronze	Total
1	Trixi Worrack (GER)	5	1	0	6
2	Ellen van Dijk (NED)	4	1	1	6
3	Evelyn Stevens (USA)	4	1	0	5
4	Karol-Ann Canuel (CAN)	3	2	0	5
5	Lisa Brennauer (GER)	3	1	0	4
6	Chantal Blaak (NED)	2	3	1	6
7	Alena Amialiusik (BLR)	2	1	1	4
8	Carmen Small (USA)	2	0	0	2
9	Christine Majerus (LUX)	1	3	0	4
10	Lucinda Brand (NED)	1	1	3	5
