= 1991 UCI Road World Championships – Women's team time trial =

Women's team time trial
1991 UCI Road World Championships

Race details
- Dates: 21 August 1991
- Stages: 1
- Distance: 49.55 km (30.79 mi)
- Winning time: 1h 02' 14"

Medalists
| | Gold | France |
| | Silver | Netherlands |
| | Bronze | Soviet Union |

The women's team time trial of the 1991 UCI Road World Championships cycling event took place on 21 August 1991 in Stuttgart, Germany. The course was 49.55 km long.

== Final classification ==
| Rank | Country | Riders | Time |
|---|---|---|---|
| 1st place, gold medalist(s) | France | Marion Clignet Nathalie Gendron; Cécile Odin; Catherine Marsal | 1h 02' 14" |
| 2nd place, silver medalist(s) | Netherlands | Monique de Bruin Monique Knol; Astrid Schop; Cora Westland | 1h 02' 41" |
| 3rd place, bronze medalist(s) | Soviet Union | Natalya Grinina Nadezhda Kibardina; Valentina Polkhanova; Aiga Zagorska | 1h 02' 51" |
| 4 | United States | Bunki Bankaitis-Davis Phyllis Hines; Maureen Manley; Eve Stephenson | 1h 03' 03" |
| 5 | Italy | Monica Bandini Roberta Bonanomi; Imelda Chiappa; Maria Paula Turcutto | 1h 03' 33" |
| 6 | Germany | Jutta Niehaus Gaby Prieler; Angela Ranft; Andrea Vranken | 1h 04' 01" |
| 7 | New Zealand | Vicky Eastwood; Kathy Lynch; Susan Matthews; Denise Taylor | 1h 05' 03" |
| 8 | United Kingdom | Sally Dawes Julie Hill; Louise Jones; Mandy Jones | 1h 05' 09" |
| 9 | China | Dongmei Li Suyan Li; Yinhua Yan; Shuzhen Zhang | 1h 05' 36" |
| 10 | Sweden | Marie Holjer Helena Normann; Christina Vosveld; Paula Westher | 1h 05' 53" |
| 11 | Spain | Yosuno Gorostidi Dori Ruano; Joane Somarriba; Ainhoa Artolazabal | 1h 05' 58" |
| 12 | Norway | Inguun Bollerud Monica Haga; Gunhild Orn; Monica Valen | 1h 06' 14" |
| 13 | Czechoslovakia | Milena Koseticka Ildiko Paczova; Julie Pakarkova; Jana Polokova | 1h 07' 09" |
| 14 | Switzerland | Carmen Da Ronch Barbara Heeb; Elisabeth Lötscher; Petra Walczewski | 1h 07' 42" |
| 15 | Taiwan | Shu Ying Chang Chia Lin Wang; Ching Wan Lee; Hsiu Chen Yang | 1h 13' 13" |
