= 1993 UCI Road World Championships – Women's team time trial =

Women's team time trial
1993 UCI Road World Championships

Race details
- Dates: 25 August 1993
- Stages: 1
- Distance: 50 km (31 mi)
- Winning time: 1h 06' 31"

Medalists
	Gold	Russia
	Silver	United States
	Bronze	Italy

The women's team time trial of the 1993 UCI Road World Championships cycling event took place on 25 August 1993 in Oslo, Norway. The course was 50 km long.

== Final classification ==
Rank	Country	Riders	Time
1st place, gold medalist(s)	Russia	Svetlana Bubnenkova Aleksandra Koliaseva; Valentina Polkhanova; Olga Sokolova	1h 06' 31"
2nd place, silver medalist(s)	United States	Jan Bolland Deirdre Demet; Jeanne Golay; Eve Stephenson	1h 09' 32"
3rd place, bronze medalist(s)	Italy	Roberta Bonanomi Alessandra Cappellotto; Michela Fanini; Fabiana Luperini	1h 09' 34"
4	Germany	Cordula Gruber Anke Hohlfeld; Sandra Kratz-Schumacher; Claudia Lehmann	1h 09' 42"
5	France	Nathalie Gendron Catherine Marsal; Corinne Legal; Cécile Odin	1h 10' 35"
6	Canada	Clara Hughes Ann Samplonius; Alison Sydor; Leslie Tomlinson	1h 10' 38"
7	Lithuania	Diana Ziluite Edita Pučinskaitė; Zita Urbonaitė; Liuda Triabaite	1h 10' 55"
8	Norway	Inguun Bollerud Monica Valvik; May Britt Valand; Gunhild Ørn	1h 11' 01"
9	Spain	Yosune Artolazabal Silvia Juarez; Florencio Nuria; Teodora Ruano	1h 11' 12"
10	Netherlands	Leontien van Moorsel Ingrid Haringa; Astrid Schop; Daniëlle Overgaag	1h 11' 28"
11	Ukraine	Tamara Poliakova Jelena Oguy; Irina Denisyuk; Marina Prudnikova	1h 11' 34"
12	Sweden	Helena Normann Christina Vosveld; Gunilla Johansson; Madeleine Lindberg	1h 12' 29"
13	Switzerland	Susanne Krauer Monika Riediker; Sandra Krauer; Jolanda Schleuniger	1h 13' 36"
14	Finland	Katarina Ebeling Orvokki Kauppila; Aino Laurio; Tarja Leena Lehtimaki	1h 14' 41"
