= 1992 UCI Road World Championships – Women's team time trial =

Women's team time trial
1992 UCI Road World Championships

Race details
- Dates: 5 September 1992
- Stages: 1
- Distance: 50 km (31 mi)
- Winning time: 1h 03' 30"

Medalists
	Gold	United States
	Silver	France
	Bronze	Russia

The women's team time trial of the 1992 UCI Road World Championships cycling event took place on 5 September 1992 in Benidorm, Spain. The course was 50 km long.

== Final classification ==
Rank	Country	Riders	Time
1st place, gold medalist(s)	United States	Bunki Bankaitis-Davis; Jan Bolland; Jeanne Golay; Eve Stephenson	1h 03' 30"
2nd place, silver medalist(s)	France	Jeannie Longo-Ciprelli; Catherine Marsal; Corinne Legal; Cécile Odin	1h 03' 43"
3rd place, bronze medalist(s)	Russia	Nadezhda Kibardina; Natalya Grinina; Gulnara Fatkullina; Aleksandra Koliaseva	1h 04' 16"
4	Italy	Antonella Bellutti; Roberta Bonanomi; Alessandra Cappellotto; Maria Paula Turcutto	1h 04' 28"
5	Lithuania	Aiga Zagorska; Daiva Capeliene; Natalia Olsevskaja; Liuda Triabaite	1h 04' 40"
6	Ukraine	Tamara Poliakova; Jelena Oguy; Svetlana Giglieva; Irina Denisiuk	1h 05' 12"
7	Netherlands	Leontien Van Moorsel; Ingrid Haringa; Astrid Schop; Lenie Dijkstra	1h 05' 16
8	New Zealand	Joann Burke; Kay Jones; Kathy Lynch; Denise Taylor	1h 05' 39"
9	Spain	Ainhoa Artolazabal; Yosune Artolazabal; Dori Ruano; Yosuno Gorostidi	1h 06' 08"
10	Norway	Inguun Bollerud; Monica Valvik; May Britt Valand; Gunhild Orn	1h 06' 21"
11	Germany	Petra Rossner; Cordula Gruber; Andrea Vranken; Monika Diebel	1h 06' 29"
12	Sweden	Marie Holjer; Helena Normann; Christina Vosveld; Elisabeth Westman	1h 07' 04"
13	Czechoslovakia	Alena Barilova; Ildiko Paczova; Julie Pakarkova; Sarka Vichova	1h 07' 24"
14	United Kingdom	Marie Purvis; Louise Jones; Sarah Philips; Sally Hodge	1h 08' 08"
