= Cycling at the 1992 Summer Olympics – Women's individual road race =

Women's road race at the Games of the XXV Olympiad
- Venue: Sant Sadurní d'Anoia, Barcelona
- Date: 26 July
- Competitors: 57 from 26 nations
- Winning time: 2:04:42

Medalists
1st place, gold medalist(s)		Kathryn Watt; Australia
2nd place, silver medalist(s)		Jeannie Longo-Ciprelli; France
3rd place, bronze medalist(s)		Monique Knol; Netherlands

These are the official results of the Women's Individual Road Race at the 1992 Summer Olympics in Barcelona, Spain. The race over 81 kilometres was held on July 26, 1992. There were a total number of 58 competitors, with one non-starter.

== Final classification ==
RANK	FINAL	TIME
	Kathryn Watt (AUS)	2:04:42
	Jeannie Longo-Ciprelli (FRA)	2:05:02
	Monique Knol (NED)	2:05:03
4.	Nataliya Kyshchuk (EUN)	—
5.	Monica Valvik (NOR)	—
6.	Jeanne Golay (USA)	—
7.	Kathleen Shannon (AUS)	—
8.	Luzia Zberg (SUI)	—
9.	Marie Höljer (SWE)	—
10.	Sally Zack (USA)	—
11.	Karina Skibby (DEN)	—
12.	Alison Sydor (CAN)	—
13.	Jacqui Uttien (AUS)	—
14.	Aiga Zagorska (LTU)	—
15.	Kristel Werckx (BEL)	—
16.	Zinaida Stahurskaya (EUN)	—
17.	Valeria Cappellotto (ITA)	—
18.	Laima Zilporytė (LTU)	—
19.	Viola Paulitz (GER)	—
20.	Daiva Čepelienė (LTU)	—
21.	Catherine Marsal (FRA)	—
22.	Petra Walczewski (SUI)	—
23.	Leontien van Moorsel (NED)	—
24.	Marie Purvis (GBR)	—
25.	Tea Vikstedt-Nyman (FIN)	—
26.	Inga Thompson (USA)	—
27.	Elisabeth Westman (SWE)	—
28.	Petra Rossner (GER)	—
29.	Petra Grimbergen (NED)	—
30.	Joann Burke (NZL)	—
31.	Kelly-Ann Way (CAN)	—
32.	Maria Paola Turcutto (ITA)	—
33.	Marion Clignet (FRA)	2:05:13
34.	Ainhoa Artolazábal (ESP)	—
35.	Belén Cuevas (ESP)	2:05:26
36.	Maria Hawkins (CAN)	2:05:33
37.	Gunhild Ørn (NOR)	2:05:46
38.	Madeleine Lindberg (SWE)	—
39.	Roberta Bonanomi (ITA)	2:05:58
40.	Louise Jones (GBR)	2:08:13
41.	Ingunn Bollerud (NOR)	2:09:42
42.	Teodora Ruano (ESP)	—
43.	Barbara Heeb (SUI)	—
44.	Jutta Niehaus (GER)	—
45.	Sally Hodge (GBR)	2:14:10
46.	Jacqueline Martin (RSA)	2:15:42
47.	Yvonne Elkuch (LIE)	2:21:32
48.	Cláudia Carceroni-Saintagne (BRA)	2:23:52
49.	Rosalind Reekie (NZL)	—
50.	Yumiko Suzuki (JPN)	2:29:22
51.	Éva Izsák (HUN)	—
52.	Margaret Bean (GUM)	—
53.	Pak Chun-Wa (PRK)	2:38:38
54.	Kim Gyong-hui (PRK)	2:39:43
—	Svetlana Samokhvalova (EUN)	DNF
—	Choi In-ae (PRK)	DNF
—	Camille Solis (BIZ)	DNF
—	Olga Sacasa (NCA)	DNS
