= 1990 UCI Road World Championships – Women's team time trial =

Women's team time trial
1990 UCI Road World Championships

Race details
- Dates: 29 August 1990
- Stages: 1
- Distance: 49 km (30 mi)
- Winning time: 1h 03' 51"

Medalists
	Gold	Netherlands
	Silver	United States
	Bronze	Soviet Union

The women's team time trial of the 1990 UCI Road World Championships cycling event took place on 29 August 1990 in Utsunomiya, Japan. The course was 49 km long and went from Utsunomiya to Nikkō and back to Utsunomiya.

== Final classification ==
Rank	Country	Riders	Time
1st place, gold medalist(s)	Netherlands	Leontien Van Moorsel Monique Knol; Cora Westland; Astrid Schop	1h 03' 51"
2nd place, silver medalist(s)	United States	Phyllis Hines Maureen Manley; Eve Stephenson; Inga Thompson	1h 04' 07"
3rd place, bronze medalist(s)	Soviet Union	Natalya Melyokhina Nadezhda Kibardina; Valentina Polkhanova; Natalia Chipaeva	1h 04' 21"
4	France	Catherine Marsal Cécile Odin; Corinne Le Gal; Roselyne Riou	1h 05' 40"
5	Sweden	Marie Holjer Helena Norman; Paula Westher; Christina Vosveld	1h 06' 12"
6	Spain	Belen Cuevas Consuela Alvarez; Joana Somarriba; Teodora Ruano	1h 06' 51"
7	Canada	Sara Neil Kelly Ann Way; Alison Sydor; Kelly Ann Carter-Erdman	1h 07' 09"
8	Italy	Monica Bandini Maria Paula Turcutto; Katia Furlan; Elisabeth Fanton	1h 07' 10"
9	West Germany	Heidi Metzger Jutta Niehaus; Viola Paulitz; Petra Rössner	1h 07' 22"
10	Japan	Hirono Hori Wakako Abe; Yukari Mitamura; Mika Kuroki	1h 10' 28"
