= 1994 UCI Road World Championships – Women's team time trial =

Women's team time trial
1994 UCI Road World Championships

Race details
- Dates: 21 August 1994
- Stages: 1
- Distance: 50.2 km (31.2 mi)
- Winning time: 1h 04' 55"

Medalists
	Gold	Russia
	Silver	Lithuania
	Bronze	United States

The women's team time trial of the 1994 UCI Road World Championships cycling event took place on 21 August 1994 in Palermo, Italy. The course was 50.2 km long.

== Final classification ==
Rank	Country	Riders	Time
1st place, gold medalist(s)	Russia	Olga Sokolova Aleksandra Koliaseva; Svetlana Bubnenkova; Valentina Polkhanova	1h 04' 55"
2nd place, silver medalist(s)	Lithuania	Rasa Polikevičiūtė Jolanta Polikevičiūtė; Diana Žiliūtė; Liuda Triabaite	1h 05' 39"
3rd place, bronze medalist(s)	United States	Deirdre Demet Eve Stephenson; Jeanne Golay; Alison Dunlap	1h 05' 53"
4	Spain	Izaskun Bengoa Nuria Florencio; Berta Fernadez; Carmen Perez	1h 06' 51"
5	Italy	Roberta Bonanomi Alessandra Cappellotto; Sigrid Corneo; Samanta Rizzi	1h 07' 07"
6	Germany	Cordula Gruber Anke Hohlfeld; Tanja Klein; Claudia Lehmann	1h 09' 15"
