= Cycling at the 2004 Summer Olympics – Women's road time trial =

Cycling at the Olympics

Women's road time trial at the Games of the XXVIII Olympiad
- Venues: Vouliagmeni Olympic Centre
- Date: 18 August 2004
- Competitors: 25 from 16 nations
- Winning time: 31:11.53

Medalists
1st place, gold medalist(s)		Leontien van Moorsel	Netherlands
2nd place, silver medalist(s)		Deirdre Demet-Barry	United States
3rd place, bronze medalist(s)		Karin Thürig	Switzerland

These are the results of the women's time trial event in cycling at the 2004 Summer Olympics. The race was held at 13:00 on 18 August. Zijlaard-Van Moorsel, who had crashed on the penultimate lap of the road race three days earlier, showed no serious damage had been done as she successfully defended her Olympic individual time trial title.

== Medalists ==
Gold	Silver	Bronze
Leontien van Moorsel (NED)	Deirdre Demet-Barry (USA)	Karin Thürig (SUI)

== Results ==
Final results
Rank	Athlete	Country	Time
1st place, gold medalist(s)	Leontien van Moorsel	Netherlands	31:11.53
2nd place, silver medalist(s)	Deirdre Demet-Barry	United States	31:35.62
3rd place, bronze medalist(s)	Karin Thürig	Switzerland	31:54.89
4	Christine Thorburn	United States	32:14.82
5	Lada Kozlíková	Czech Republic	32:15.41
6	Oenone Wood	Australia	32:16.00
7	Joane Somarriba Arrola	Spain	32:25.93
8	Zulfiya Zabirova	Russia	32:30.08
9	Priska Doppmann	Switzerland	32:40.47
10	Edita Pučinskaitė	Lithuania	32:42.12
11	Judith Arndt	Germany	32:46.94
12	Olga Slyusareva	Russia	32:51.06
13	Mirjam Melchers	Netherlands	33:01.58
14	Jeannie Longo Ciprelli	France	33:05.72
15	Trixi Worrack	Germany	33:05.72
16	Lyne Bessette	Canada	33:24.19
17	Susan Palmer-Komar	Canada	33:26.01
18	Dori Ruano Sanchon	Spain	33:29.63
19	Nicole Cooke	Great Britain	33:45.22
20	Edwige Pitel	France	34:02.35
21	Tatiana Guderzo	Italy	34:14.47
22	Anita Valen	Norway	34:31.94
23	Rasa Polikevičiūtė	Lithuania	34:34.48
24	Nataliya Kachalka	Ukraine	35:01.05
25	Susanne Ljungskog	Sweden	35:17.25
