= Daniëlle Overgaag =

Dutch cyclist and TV presenter (born 1973)

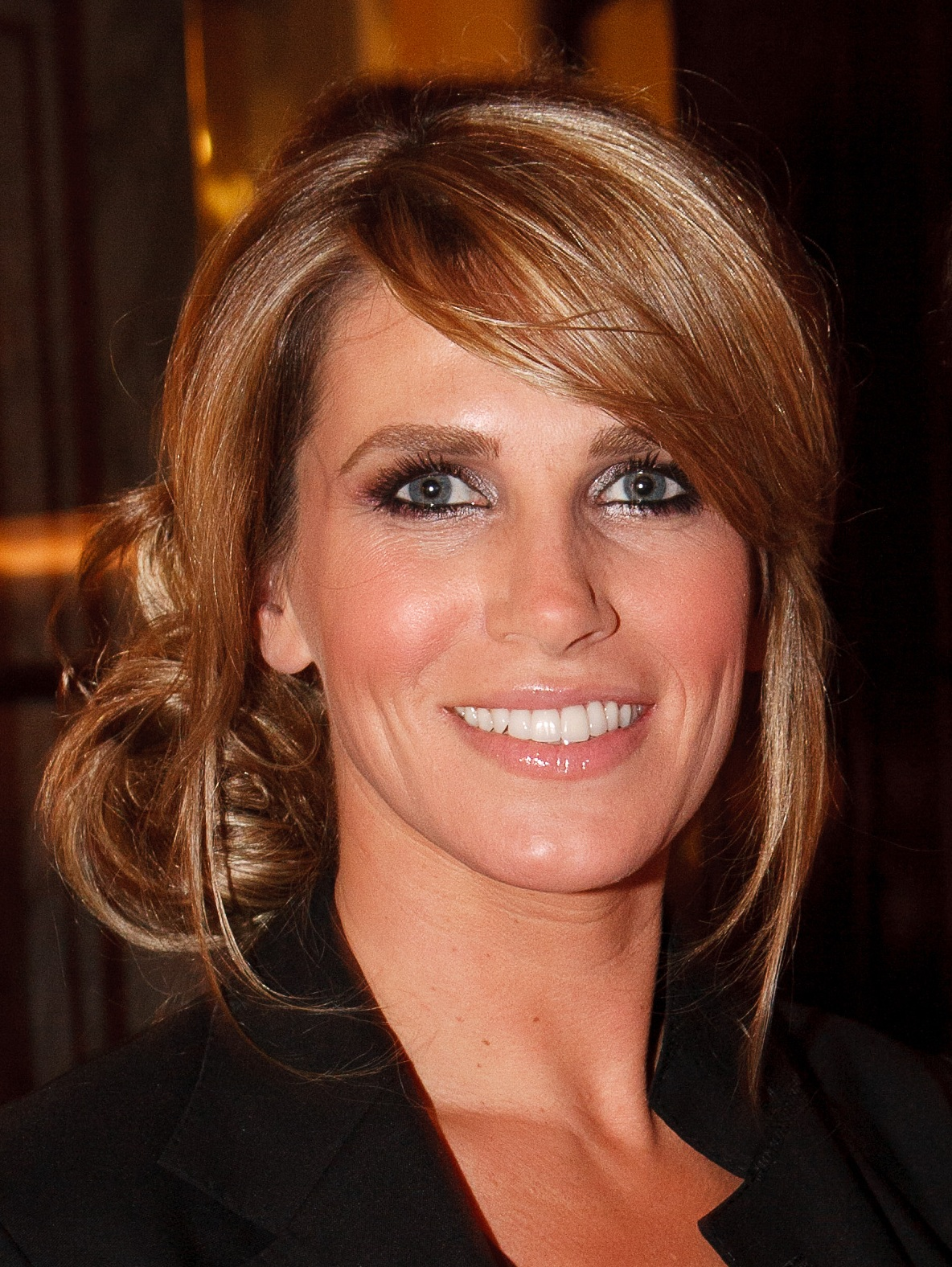

Personal information
- Born: 24 March 1973 (age 53) 's-Gravenzande, the Netherlands

Cycling career
- Sport: Cycling
- Discipline: Road cycling

Daniëlle Overgaag (born 24 March 1973) is a road cyclist from the Netherlands.

== Cycling career ==
As a junior, she won bronze at the World Championships in the women's junior road race. She participated at the 1993 UCI Road World Championships in the Women's team time trial. In 1993 she won the silver medal at the Dutch National Road Race Championships and in 1994 she won the silver medal at the Dutch National Time Trial Championships.

== Personal life ==
Overgaag is married to Reinout Oerlemans, and together they have four children.
