= 2003 UCI Road World Championships – Women's time trial =

Women's time trial
2003 UCI Road World Championships
- Rainbow jersey

Race details
- Dates: 8 October 2003 in Hamilton, Canada
- Stages: 1
- Distance: 20.8 km (12.9 mi)
- Winning time: 28' 23"

Medalists
	Gold	Joane Somarriba (ESP)
	Silver	Judith Arndt (GER)
	Bronze	Zulfiya Zabirova (RUS)

The Women's time trial at the 2003 UCI Road World Championships took place over a distance of 20.8 kilometres (12.9 miles) in Hamilton, Ontario, Canada on 8 October 2003.

== Final classification ==
Rank	Rider	Country	Time
1st place, gold medalist(s)	Joane Somarriba	Spain	28' 23"
2nd place, silver medalist(s)	Judith Arndt	Germany	+ 10"
3rd place, bronze medalist(s)	Zulfiya Zabirova	Russia	+ 26"
4	Karin Thürig	Switzerland	+ 27"
5	Geneviève Jeanson	Canada	+ 48"
6	Jeannie Longo	France	+ 58"
7	Lada Kozlíková	Czech Republic	+ 1' 01"
8	Deirdre Demet-Barry	United States	+ 1' 16"
9	Teodora Ruano	Spain	+ 1' 22"
10	Edita Pučinskaitė	Lithuania	+ 1' 24"
11	Edwige Pitel	France	+ 1' 30"
12	Olga Zabelinskaïa	Russia	+ 1' 37"
13	Kristin Armstrong	United States	+ 1' 41"
14	Mirjam Melchers	Netherlands	+ 1' 43"
15	Lyne Bessette	Canada	+ 1' 48"
16	Olivia Gollan	Australia	+ 1' 49"
17	Vera Carrara	Italy	+ 1' 51"
18	Sara Carrigan	Australia	+ 1' 57"
19	Meifang Li	China	+ 1' 58"
20	Frances Newstead	United Kingdom	+ 2' 03"
21	Hanka Kupfernagel	Germany	+ 2' 10"
22	Paola Madrinan	Colombia	+ 2' 14"
23	Leah Goldstein	Israel	+ 2' 14"
24	Christiane Soeder	Austria	+ 2' 17"
25	Susanne Ljungskog	Sweden	+ 2' 17"
26	Svetlana Boubnenkova	Russia	+ 2' 24"
27	Nicole Brändli	Switzerland	+ 2' 27"
28	Anna Zugno	Italy	+ 2' 29"
29	Kirsty Robb	New Zealand	+ 2' 32"
30	Bogumiła Matusiak	Poland	+ 2' 36"
31	Rasa Polikevičiūtė	Lithuania	+ 2' 49"
32	Anita Valen de Vries	Norway	+ 3' 00"
33	Nataliya Kachalka	Ukraine	+ 3' 10"
34	Loes Gunnewijk	Netherlands	+ 3' 20"
35	Sinead Jennings	Ireland	+ 3' 37"
36	Wendy Houvenaghel	United Kingdom	+ 3' 53"
37	Corine Hierckens	Belgium	+ 3' 53"
38	Andrea Graus	Austria	+ 3' 57"
39	Evy Van Damme	Belgium	+ 3' 59"
40	Junying Zhang	China	+ 4' 01"
41	Melissa Holt	New Zealand	+ 4' 02"
42	Joanna Ignasiak	Poland	+ 4' 54"
43	Erika Csomor	Hungary	+ 5' 00"
