= 1990 UCI Road World Championships =

Cycling world championships

- Location within Japan
- Venue: Utsunomiya, Japan
- Date: 29 August –2 September 1990
- Coordinates: 36°33′18.4″N 139°52′57.2″E
- Events: 5

The 1990 UCI Road World Championships took place in Utsunomiya, Japan, from August 29 to September 2, 1990. The championships were held in Asia for the first time.

In the same period, the 1990 UCI Track Cycling World Championships were organised in Maebashi.

== Events summary ==
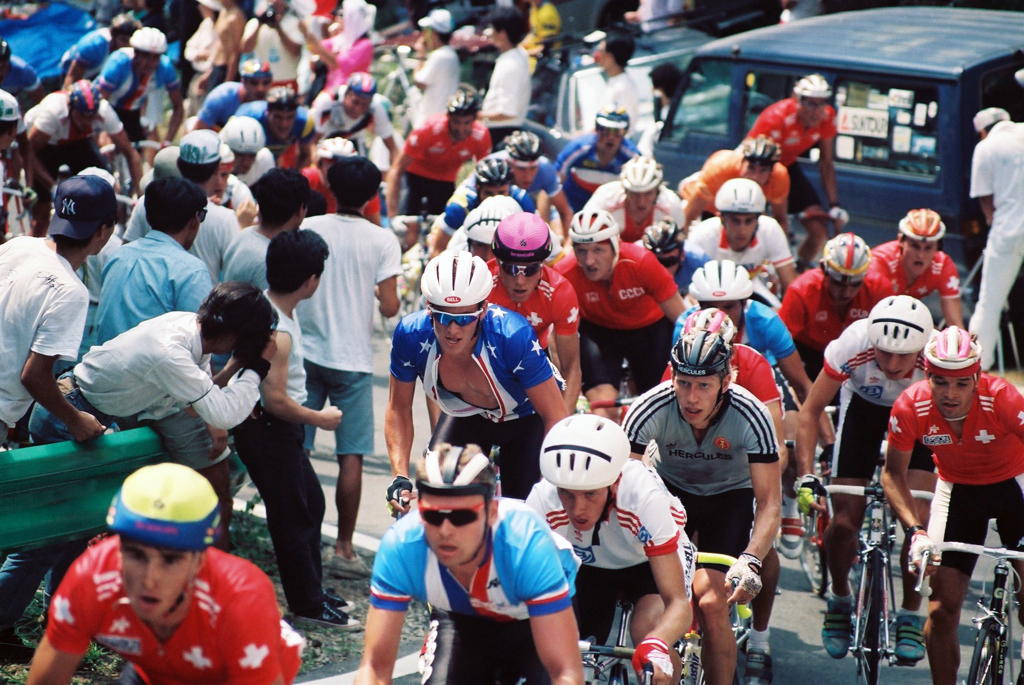
Lance Armstrong (centre left) and Laurent Dufaux (right) during the amateur road race

Event	Gold		Silver		Bronze	
Men's Events
Men's Professional Road Race	Rudy Dhaenens; Belgium	6h51'59"	Dirk De Wolf; Belgium	s.t.	Gianni Bugno; Italy	+ 8"
Team Time Trial	Soviet Union	-	East Germany	-	West Germany	-
Men's Amateur Road Race	Mirco Gualdi; Italy	-	Roberto Caruso; Italy	-	Jean-Philippe Dojwa; France	-
Women's Events
Women's Road Race	Catherine Marsal; France	2h 0' 07"	Ruthie Matthes; United States	+ 3' 24"	Luisa Seghezzi; Italy	s.t.
Team Time Trial	Netherlands; Leontien Van Moorsel; Monique Knol; Cora Westland; Astrid Schop	1h 03' 51"	United States; Phyllis Hines; Maureen Manley; Eve Stephenson; Inga Thompson	+ 16"	Soviet Union; Natalya Melyokhina; Nadezhda Kibardina; Valentina Polkhanova; Natalia Chipaeva	+ 30"
