= Women's Challenge =

Coordinates: 43.870°N 114.713°W

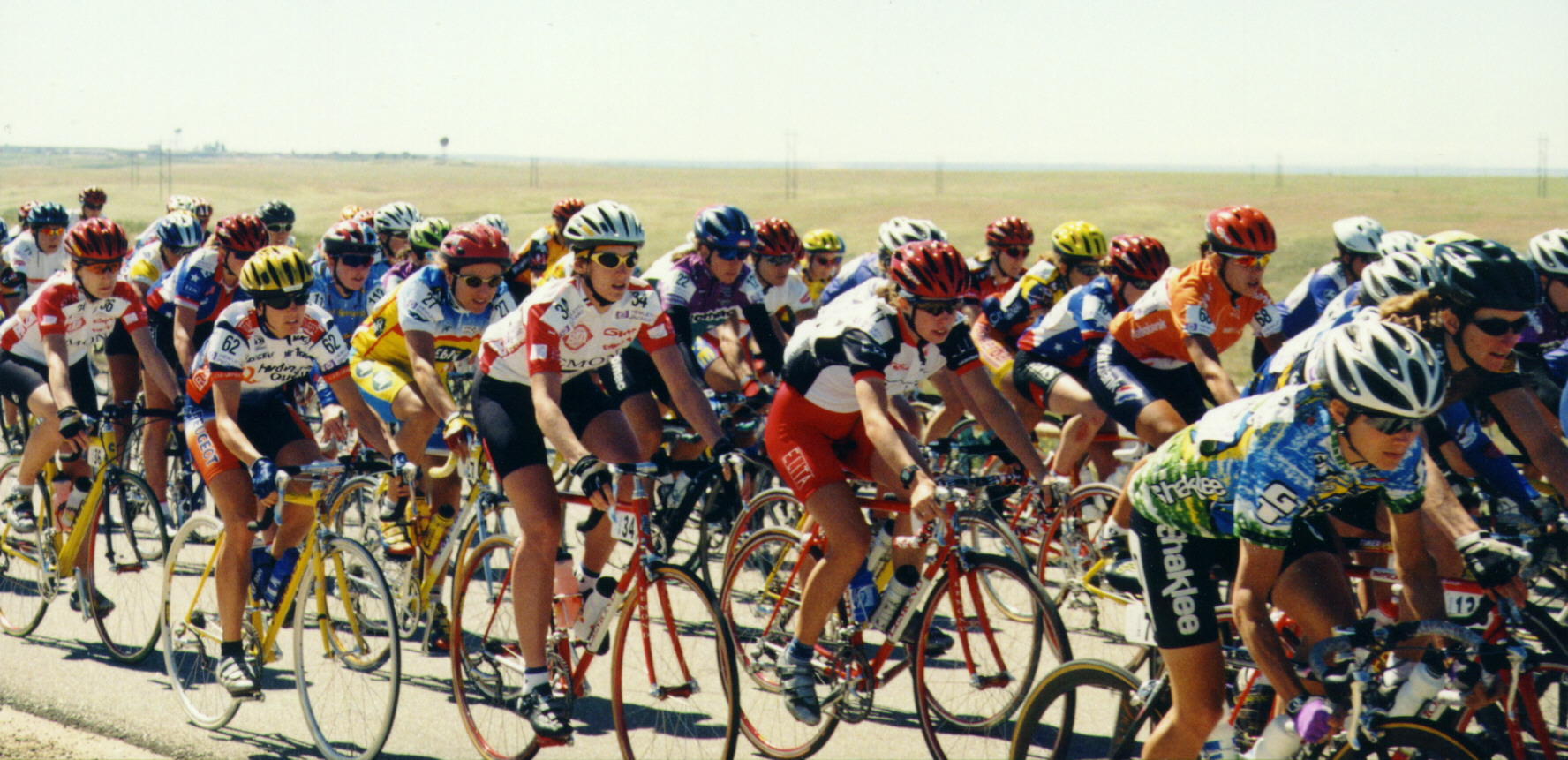
The peloton in 1998, at the start of the Boise to Idaho City stage

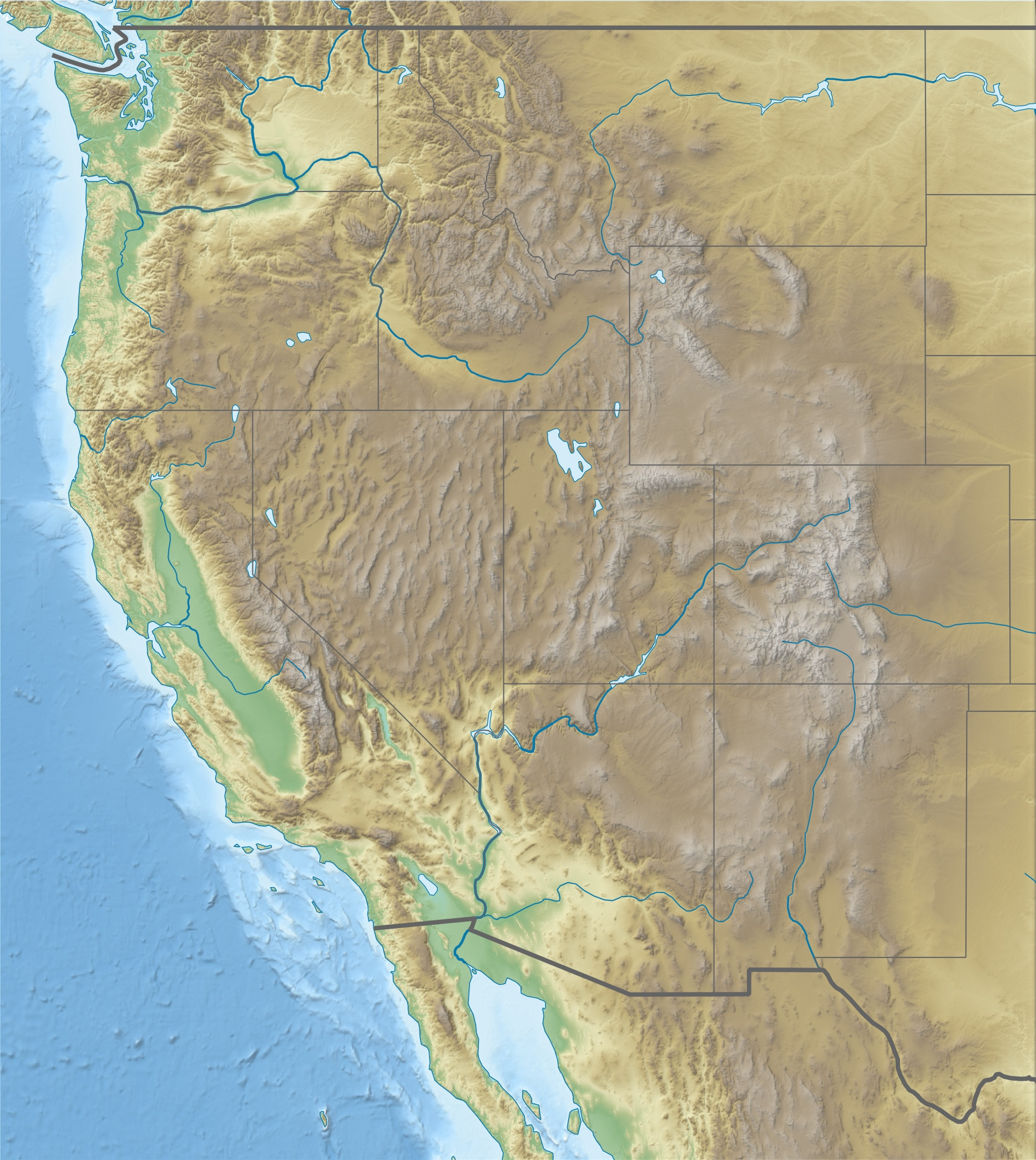
Location in the western United States
Location in Idaho

The Women's Challenge bicycle race (originally known as the Ore-Ida Women's Challenge as the lead sponsor was the Ore-Ida brand of frozen potato products) was held annually in the western United States in southern Idaho, beginning in 1984 until its demise in 2002. Later primary sponsors were PowerBar and Hewlett-Packard.

During much of its 19-year history, it was the most prestigious women's cycle race in North America. From 1995, when it first obtained sanctioning from the Union Cycliste Internationale (UCI), the international governing body for cycling, it developed into one of the strongest races in the world, attracting numerous World and Olympic Champions. Prior to that, in 1990, the UCI had refused to sanction the event, citing as their reason the "excessive climbing, stage distances, number of stages, and duration of event." The race that year, Idaho's centennial, began in northern Idaho at Sandpoint, was 17 stages and 663 miles (1,067 km), and was won by Inga Thompson. The fifth stage through Lewiston ended with the climb up the Spiral Highway, a twisty rise of two thousand vertical feet (610 m).

The following year (1991) marked the debut on the international scene of a team representing Lithuania, which had just recently declared its independence and was still awaiting recognition as a country. Professionals were allowed to compete beginning in 1993.

The race, which was run almost entirely by volunteers, set a very high standard in terms of technical administration and conduct of the race itself. Jim Rabdau, the race founder, served as chief organizer of the race throughout its entire history.

By the late 1990s, the race was able to attract sufficient sponsorship money to offer the richest prize fund ever in women's cycling and, for a while, was the richest prize fund race in North America, men's or women's. At its peak, it offered $125,000 in prizes.

However, cuts in sponsorship forced a reduction in prize money to $75,000 in its last year (2002) and no title sponsor could be found to replace the outgoing sponsor for the following year, forcing the cancellation of the race. Race organizers cited a downturn in the economy as the reason.

One of the stages crested Galena Summit at 8,701 feet (2,652 m) above sea level on Highway 75, the Northwest's highest highway pass.

== Women's Challenge winners ==
Year	1st Place	2nd Place	3rd Place
1984	Rebecca Twigg (USA)	Cindy Olavarri (USA)	Inga Thompson (USA)
1985	Rebecca Twigg (USA)	Inga Thompson (USA)	Sally Kittredge (USA)
1986	Rebecca Twigg (USA)	Madonna Harris (NZL)	Susan Ehlers (USA)
1987	Inga Thompson (USA)	Katrin Tobin (USA)	Susan Ehlers (USA)
1988	Katrin Tobin (USA)	Jane Marshall (USA)	Sara Neil (CAN)
1989	Lisa Brambani (GBR)	Ruthie Matthes (USA)	Jane Marshall (USA)
1990	Inga Thompson (USA)	Ruthie Matthes (USA)	Lisa Brambani (GBR)
1991	Jeannie Longo (FRA)	Dede Demet (USA)	Diana Cepeliene (LTU)
1992	Eve Stephenson (USA)	Inga Thompson (USA)	Jeanne Golay (USA)
1993	Jeanne Golay (USA)	Eve Stephenson (USA)	Karen Kurreck (USA)
1994	Clara Hughes (CAN)	Anne Samplonius (CAN)	Karen Kurreck (USA)
1995	Dede Demet (USA)	Jeanne Golay (USA)	Mari Holden (USA)
1996	Anna Wilson (AUS)	Clara Hughes (CAN)	Dede Demet (USA)
1997	Rasa Polikevičiūtė (LTU)	Linda Jackson (CAN)	Zulfiya Zabirova (RUS)
1998	Linda Jackson (CAN)	Valentina Polkhanova (RUS)	Diana Žiliūtė (LTU)
1999	Jeannie Longo (FRA)	Mari Holden (USA)	Zulfiya Zabirova (RUS)
2000	Anna Wilson (AUS)	Diana Žiliūtė (LTU)	Sarah Ulmer (NZL)
2001	Lyne Bessette (CAN)	Judith Arndt (GER)	Rasa Polikevičiūtė (LTU)
2002	Judith Arndt (GER)	Genevieve Jeanson (CAN)	Kim Bruckner (USA)
