= Oregon Bicycle Racing Association =

The Oregon Bicycle Racing Association is a bicycle racing organization based in the U.S. state of Oregon.

== Mission ==
The mission of OBRA is to promote and develop the sport of bicycle racing in Oregon by providing the tools and resources necessary for competition.

== History ==
=== Foundation ===
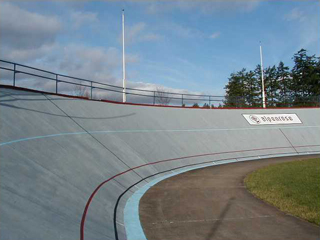
Alpenrose Velodrome

The Oregon Bicycle Racing Association (OBRA) was started in the late 1970s. Called the Oregon Cycling Association (OCA), it was then the district association of USCF clubs. The name was changed to the Oregon Bicycle Racing Association several years later to avoid confusion with the political group, the Oregon Citizens Alliance which was getting much negative media attention.

There was not much activity for the first few years after OCA was formed. When Steve Scarich became the District Representative he pushed to increase the strength of the organization. Organization was improved and a system of collecting fees from races was established. A few years later Mike Murray was elected to the board. Murray wanted more racing in Oregon so he turned the focus of the group toward making it easier to produce quality events. He bought traffic signs, photo finish equipment, PA systems, CB radios and more.

=== Separation from USCF ===
Dissatisfaction with the United States Cycling Federation came on slowly and climaxed in December 1998 when the USCF fired all Regional Representatives in favor of a plan to utilize 10 people nationwide to service the membership. At this same time alternatives to the insurance provided by the national governing body became more readily available and the question was asked, 'What is OBRA getting back for the dollars that are sent to Colorado Springs?' An annual membership ranged from $35 to $50 and then the charge for insurance was about twice what was available commercially. OBRA leadership figured that Oregon alone was sending about $200,000 annually to USAC in USCF and NORBA membership fees and race permits and surcharges. In exchange OBRA received little in the way of services and soon their local representation would be eliminated. When USA Cycling doubled the permit fees for weekend day series races, OBRA leadership sent a message to Colorado Springs that Oregon series promoters would choose to insure with an insurance plan purchased by OBRA and to forgo USCF sanctioning. Letters were sent to every USAC board director and staff member explaining why OBRA were doing this and further explaining that it was likely that all Oregon events would do this unless USAC made changes to address concerns over the diminishing level of service. Only one response from USAC was received.

In the fall of 1998 there was a vote of member clubs that was unanimous that the OBRA insurance plan would be offered at all events.

=== Success ===
OBRA membership has gotten to the highest levels when David Beede contacted OBRA about branching out into mountain bike racing. The dissatisfaction among NORBA members was greater than that from the road/track side. Last year they were able to organize a race series amongst the mountain bike races and added them to OBRAs email network.

Now other states have followed their lead. American Bicycle Racing (ABR) in the Midwest, Bicycle Racing Association of Colorado (BRAC - which has now changed its name to American Cycling Association) represent Colorado, Arizona, New Mexico, Texas and parts of Texas and North California/Nevada Cycling Association (NCNCA) have all formed a coalition of association- Federation of Independent Cycling Associations (FIAC). OBRA has started incorporation proceedings and are working toward a shared rulebook and rider reciprocity. The OBRA 2000 calendar has over 200 days of racing, offering discounted membership to juniors and strongly suggest that the race organizers reduce entry fees for those under 18. The Best All round Competition has expanded to recognize the outstanding performances in each discipline and new for 2000 OBRA are hosting an Oregon Cup.

=== Statistics ===
According to OBRA statistics, membership has grown dramatically since 2000.

- 2000- 1738 members
- 2001- 1741 members
- 2002- 1978 members
- 2003- 2335 members
- 2004- 2760 members
- 2005- 2828 members
- 2006- 3296 members, 1014 1-day memberships

According to Velonews (2006)

- Oregon was ranked #2 in the number of cycling events, only 8 races behind California.
- Oregon was ranked #3 in the number of amateur racers, behind only California and Colorado.
- Oregon was ranked #1 in terms of the percentage of riders vs. state population with Colorado coming in over 50% lower in 2nd place.

=== Notable current and former members ===
- Chris Horner winner of the 2013 Vuelta a España
- Aaron Olson retired professional cyclist who rode for Saunier Duval–Prodir and T-Mobile Team
- Ryan Trebon mountain bike national champion and 2-time cyclocross national champion
- Ian Boswell retired professional road cyclist who rode for Team Sky and Team Katusha–Alpecin and won Unbound Gravel in 2021
- Jacob Rathe retired professional road cyclist who rode for Garmin–Barracuda
- Clara Honsinger of Cannondale–Cyclocrossworld.com and EF Education–Tibco–SVB - 2019 Cyclocross Elite Women USA National Champ
- Inga Thompson former board member and 10-time national champion and 3-time Olympian

== Organization ==
=== Governance ===
The Oregon Bicycle Racing Association is an Oregon Non Profit Corporation that has its Constitution and Bylaws on file with the State of Oregon. The business and affairs of OBRA are managed by its board of directors. There are six members of the board of directors. Each director is elected to a three-year term by a majority of club representatives at an annual meeting. Two directors are elected each year. As of January 2023, the chairwoman of the board is Stacy Westbrook, and the executive director is Chuck Kenlan.

There are four paid positions:

- Executive Director
- Webmaster
- Membership Coordinator
- Equipment Manager

=== Types of racing ===
OBRA sanctions events for six cycling disciplines. They are road, track, criterium, time trial, cyclo-cross, and the mountain bike disciplines of cross-country, downhill and super-d.

=== Reciprocity ===
OBRA maintains a reciprocity agreement with Federation of Independent Associations of Cycling (FIAC), USA Cycling (USAC) and other organizations. These agreements include honoring of memberships and/or suspensions, cooperation and production of programs.
