= Viktor Rjaksinski =

Personal information
- Born: 17 October 1967 (age 58) Kremenchuk, Soviet Union

Cycling career
- Sport: Cycling
- Current team: Retired
- Discipline: Road
- Role: Rider

Professional teams
- 1991–1992: Seur
- 1993: Deportpublic

Viktor Rjaksinski (born 17 October 1967 in Kremenchuk) is a Soviet and Ukrainian former cyclist.

== Palmares ==
1990
2nd Overall Cinturón a Mallorca
3rd Overall Tour du Hainaut
1991
1st World Amateur Road Race Championships
1st Overall Peace Race
