= 1991 UCI Road World Championships =

Cycling world championships

- Venue: Stuttgart, Germany
- Coordinates: 48°46′55″N 9°11′2″E
- Events: 5

The 1991 UCI Road World Championships took place in Stuttgart, Germany.

In the same period, the 1991 UCI Track Cycling World Championships were also organised in Stuttgart.

== Events summary ==
Event	Gold		Silver		Bronze	
Men's Events
Professional Road Race	Gianni Bugno; Italy	6h 20' 23"	Steven Rooks; Netherlands	s.t.	Miguel Indurain; Spain	s.t.
Team Time Trial	Italy	-	Germany	-	Norway	-
Amateur Road Race	Viktor Rjaksinski; Soviet Union	-	Davide Rebellin; Italy	-	Beat Zberg; Switzerland	-
Women's Events
Road Race	Leontien van Moorsel; Netherlands	2h 09' 47"	Inga Thompson; United States	+ 1' 54"	Alison Sydor; Canada	+ 2' 46"
Team Time Trial	France; Marion Clignet; Nathalie Gendron; Cécile Odin; Catherine Marsal	1h 02' 14"	Netherlands; Monique de Bruin; Monique Knol; Astrid Schop; Cora Westland		Soviet Union; Natalya Grinina; Nadezhda Kibardina; Valentina Polkhanova; Aiga Zagorska	
