= Alison Dunlap =

American cyclist

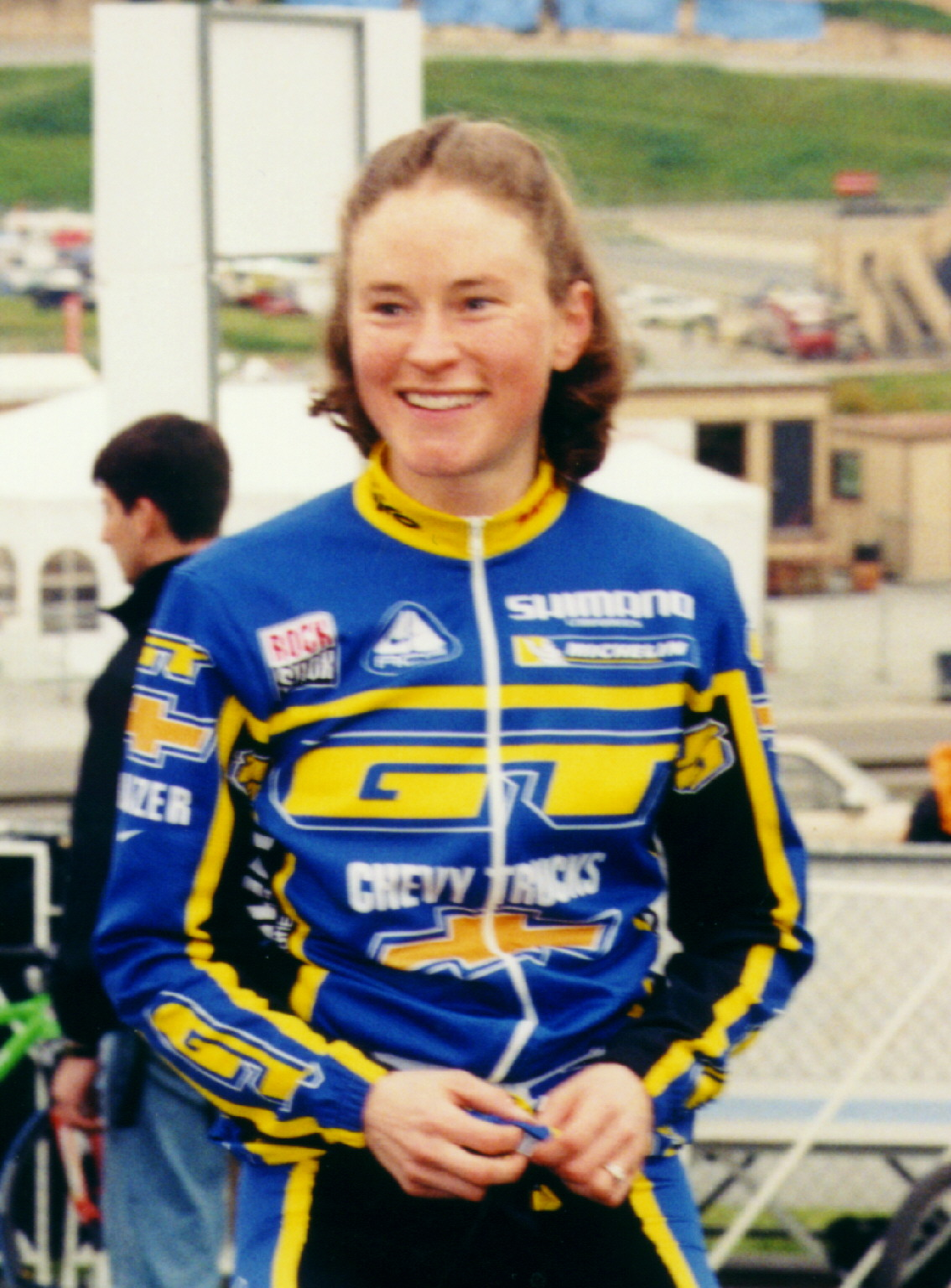
- Dunlap at the 2001 Sea Otter Classic

Personal information
- Born: July 27, 1969 (age 57)

Cycling career
- Sport: Cycling
- Disciplines: Mountain bike and road
- Role: Rider
Medal record
Representing United States
Women's mountain bike racing
World Championships
Gold medal – first place	2001 Vail	Cross-country
Women's road bicycle racing
World Championships
Bronze medal – third place	1994 Agrigento	Team time trial

Alison Dunlap (born July 27, 1969) is an American professional cyclist. She won the world cross-country mountain bike championship in 2001 and two Mountain Bike World Cup races. She also won the Redlands Bicycle Classic on the road in 1996.

Dunlap represented the United States in the road race at the 1996 Summer Olympics and the cross-country mountain bike event at the 2000 Summer Olympics.

== Major achievements ==
- UCI Tissot Mountain Bike World Cup Champion (2002)
- UCI Mountain Bike Cross Country (XC) World Champion (2001)
- Olympic Games 2000: mountain bike, 7th
- Olympic Games 1996: road race
- Pan American Games: gold medallist (cross country): (1999)
- 3x United States National cross-country champion: (1999, 2002, 2004)
- 3x United States National short-track cross-country champion: (1999, 2002, 2004)
- 6x United States National cyclo-cross champion: (1997, 1998, 1999, 2000, 2001, 2003)
- United States National Road and Omnium Collegiate champion: (1991)
- U.S. Olympic Festival gold medallist (road race) (1993)
- UCI Tissot World Cup: 2nd overall (2000)
- 8x World Mountain Bike Championship: (1994, 1997, 1998, 1999, 2000, 2001, 2002, 2004)
- World Road Cycling Championships: 1993–94 (bronze), (1998–99)
- World Cyclo-Cross Championships: 2004 (5th), 2002 (4th), 2000 (7th)
- UCI World Cup wins (mtb): two (cross-country); one in cyclo-cross (2002)
- Finished on the podium (top 5) in all UCI World Cup races (2000, 2002)
- National race wins: eight (cross-country), fourteen (short-track cross-country)
- Sea Otter Classic: 1st overall (1999, 2002, 2003, 2004); stage winner (1999–2004)
- Hewlett Packard International Women's Challenge (road) stage winner: (1993, 1996, 1997, 2001)
- Redlands Cycling Classic (road) 1st overall, one stage win: (2000, 1996)
- Tour of Willamette (road) 1st overall, two stage wins: (2001)
- Iceman Cometh Challenge 1st place (2009)

=== Accolades ===
- Colorado Springs Sports Hall of Fame Inductee (2003)
- VeloNews North American Female Cyclist of the Year (2002, 1999)
- Bicycle Retailer and Industry News Female Athlete of the Year (2002)
- Colorado Sports Hall of Fame Amateur Athlete of the Year (2001)
- Colorado Sportswoman of the Year (2001)
- Colorado Springs Gazette Telegraph Athlete of the Year (2001)
- Colorado College Athletic Hall of Fame Inductee (2000).
- Named to the Top Ten Greatest Colorado Female Athletes of All Time by the Denver Post (1999)
- U.S. Olympic Committee Athlete of the Month (June 1997, December 1999, - December 2000, September 2001)
- USA Cycling's nominee for 1998, 1999 and 2001 USOC SportsWoman of the Year
- USA Cycling's nominee for the 2001 James E. Sullivan Award
- Three-time VISA/USA Cycling Elite Mountain Bike Female Athlete of the Year (1997, 1998, 1999)
- US Collegiate Road Champion (1991) and Overall Omnium Champion (1991)

== Education ==
Dunlap was the 1987 valedictorian at Smoky Hill High School. She gained a bachelor's degree in biology in 1991 at Colorado College.

== Personal life ==
Dunlap was born in Denver, Colorado, and is married to the cyclist Greg Frozley. She has a child, Emmett, born on October 26, 2010.
