= Karen Kurreck =

American cyclist (born 1962)

Personal information
- Full name: Karen Brems Kurreck
- Born: June 13, 1962 (age 64) United States
- Height: 1.68 m (5 ft 6 in)
- Weight: 57 kg (126 lb)

Cycling career
- Sport: Cycling
- Current team: Retired
Medal record
Women's Road bicycle racing
World Championships
Gold medal – first place	1994 Catania	Individual Time Trial
US National Championships
Silver medal – second place	1993	Individual Time Trial
Silver medal – second place	1998	Individual Time Trial
Silver medal – second place	2000	Individual Time Trial
Women's Track bicycle racing
World Championships
Silver medal – second place	2017	Masters Track
US National Championships
Gold medal – first place	2008	Masters Track
Women's Cyclocross bicycle racing
World Championships
Bronze medal – third place	2013	Masters Cyclocross
Gold medal – first place	2013	Masters Cyclocross
Gold medal – first place	2012	Masters Cyclocross
US National Championships
Gold medal – first place	2018 Reno, NV	Masters Cyclocross
Gold medal – first place	2016	Masters Cyclocross
Gold medal – first place	2015	Masters Cyclocross
Gold medal – first place	2013	Masters Cyclocross

Karen Brems Kurreck (born June 13, 1962, in Urbana, Illinois) is a graduate of Urbana High School and the University of Illinois. As a racing cyclist, she is best known for winning the inaugural women's individual time trial at the 1994 UCI Road World Championships in Catania, Italy. Kurreck represented the United States at the 2000 Summer Olympics in Sydney, Australia.

Prior to her cycling career, Brems was a collegiate gymnast at the University of Illinois where in 1984 she became the first Illini athlete to be named as the school's Athlete of the Year and the Big Ten Conference Medal of Honor Award winner in the same season.

Since 2011, Brems has concentrated on the Cyclocross discipline. She won two consecutive 50+ Masters World Championships in 2012 and 2013, and several Masters 50+ championship jerseys at US Cross Nationals including: in 2013 (Master 50–54) in Louisville, Kentucky; in 2015 (Master 50–54) in Austin, Texas; in 2016 (Master 50–54) in Asheville, North Carolina; and in 2018 (Master 55–59) in Reno, Nevada.

== Major results ==
1994
1st UCI Road World Championships – Women's time trial
1995
5th UCI Road World Championships – Women's time trial
