= Natalya Melyokhina =

Soviet cyclist (1961–2024)

Natalya Melekhina
Personal information
- Born: 5 April 1962 Chelyabinsk, USSR
- Died: 28 March 2024 (aged 61)
Medal record
Representing Soviet Union
Women's Road cycling
World Championships
Gold medal – first place	1989 Chambéry	Team time trial
Bronze medal – third place	1990 Utsunomiya	Team time trial

Natalya Nikolaevna Melyokhina (Russian: Наталья Николаевна Мелёхина; 5 April 1962 – 28 March 2024) was a Soviet Union road cyclist. She became World Champion in the women's team time trial at the UCI Road World Championships in 1987 and finished second in 1990. In 1990 she also won stage 5 in Tour Cycliste Féminin de la Drôme and finished second in the general classification. Melyokhina died on 28 March 2024, at the age of 61.
