= 1992 UCI Road World Championships =

Cycling world championships

- Venue: Benidorm, Spain
- Coordinates: 38°32′03″N 0°07′53″W
- Events: 2

The 1992 UCI Road World Championships took place in Benidorm, Spain. Because this was an Olympic year, all the Olympic events served as World Championships, which left just the Professional road race and the Women's Team Time Trial to be contested.

In the same period, the 1992 UCI Track Cycling World Championships were organized in Valencia, Spain.

== Events summary ==
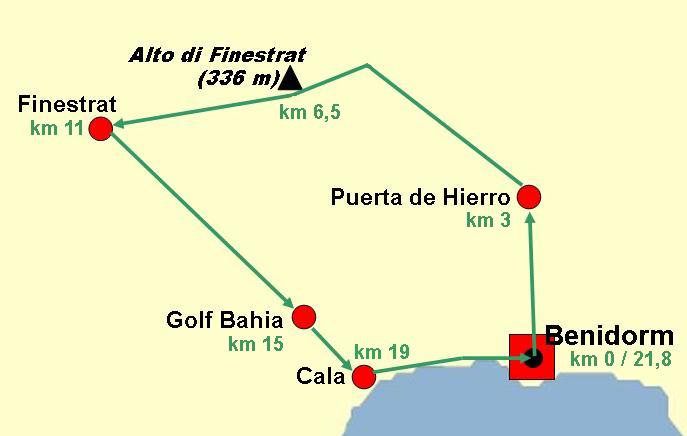
Course

Event	Gold		Silver		Bronze	
Men's Events
Professional Road Race	Gianni Bugno; Italy	6h 34' 28"	Laurent Jalabert; France	s.t.	Dimitri Konyshev; Russia	s.t.
Women's Events
Team Time Trial	United States; Bunki Bankaitis-Davis; Jan Bolland; Jeanne Golay; Eve Stephenson	1h 03' 30"	France; Jeannie Longo-Ciprelli; Catherine Marsal; Corinne Legal; Cécile Odin	+ 13"	Russia; Nadezhda Kibardina; Natalya Grinina; Gulnara Fatkullina; Aleksandra Koliaseva	+ 46"
