= Valentina Polkhanova =

Russian cyclist

Personal information
- Born: 15 August 1971 (age 55) Russia

Cycling career
- Sport: Cycling
- Discipline: Road
- Role: Rider
Medal record
Representing Russia
Women's road cycling
World Championships
Gold medal – first place	1993 Oslo	Team time trial
Gold medal – first place	1994 Agrigento	Team time trial
Bronze medal – third place	1990 Utsunomiya	Team time trial
Bronze medal – third place	1991 Stuttgart	Team time trial

Valentina Polkhanova (Russian: Валентина Николаевна Полханова, born 15 August 1971 in Russia) is a Russian road racing cyclist. She won a gold medal at the UCI Road World Championships in the team time trial in 1993 and 1994 and a bronze medal in 1990 and 1991. In 1994 she also won the Tour de France Féminin.

== Major results ==
1995
4th UCI Road World Championships – Women's time trial
