= Laura Charameda =

American cyclist

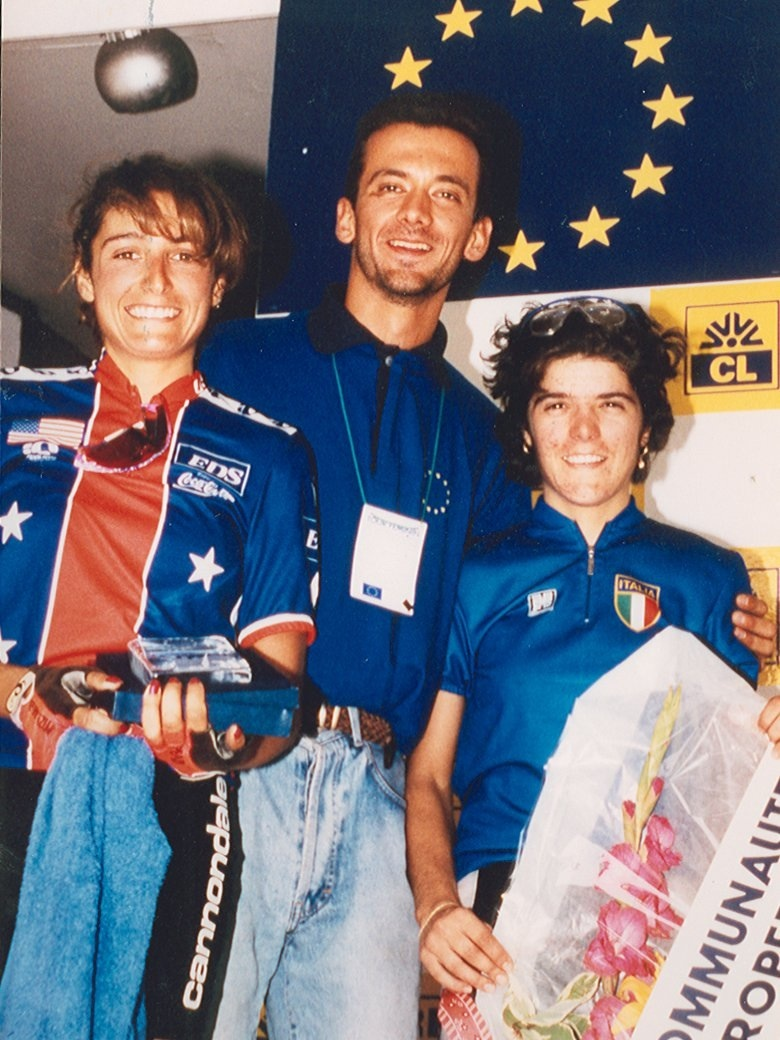
- Charameda (left) with Marco Pino and Michela Fanini in 1993

Personal information
- Born: June 5, 1964 (age 62) Marshall, Michigan, U.S.

Cycling career
- Sport: Cycling
Medal record
Representing United States
World Championships
Bronze medal – third place	1993 Oslo	Women's road race

Laura Charameda (born June 5, 1964) is an American cyclist.

== Life and career ==
Charameda was born in Marshall, Michigan. She raced in the Tour de France in 1988.

Charameda competed at the 1993 UCI Road World Championships, winning the bronze medal in the women's road race event. In 1995, she won the Thüringen Ladies Tour. She also competed at the 1996 UCI Road World Championships.
