= Zita Urbonaitė =

Lithuanian road racing cyclist (1973–2008)

Personal information
- Full name: Zita Urbonaitė
- Born: September 3, 1973 Šiauliai, Lithuanian SSR, Soviet Union
- Died: May 26, 2008 (aged 34) Montebelluna, Italy

Cycling career
- Sport: Cycling
- Discipline: Road
- Role: Rider

Major wins
- Lithuania National Road Champion (1999, 2002)

Zita Urbonaitė (September 3, 1973 – May 26, 2008) was a female road racing cyclist from Lithuania.
