= 1989 UCI Road World Championships =

- Venue: Chambéry, France
- Coordinates: 45°34′12″N 5°54′2″E
- Events: 5

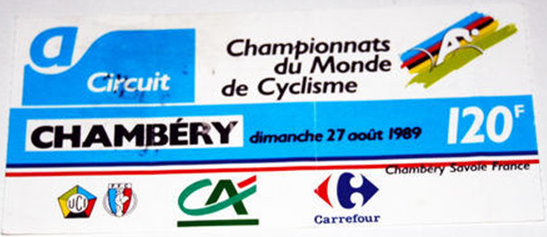
Ticket of the event

The 1989 UCI Road World Championships took place in Chambéry, France.

In the same period, the 1989 UCI Track Cycling World Championships were organized in Lyon.

== Events summary ==
Event	Gold		Silver		Bronze	
Men's Events
Professional Road Race	Greg LeMond; United States	6h 45' 59"	Dimitri Konyshev; Soviet Union	s.t.	Sean Kelly; Ireland	s.t.
Team Time Trial	East Germany	-	Poland	-	Soviet Union	-
Amateur Road Race	Joachim Halupczok; Poland	-	Eric Pichon; France	-	Christophe Manin; France	-
Women's Events
Road Race	Jeannie Longo; France	1h 56' 41"	Catherine Marsal; France	+ 4' 05"	Maria Canins; Italy	s.t.
Team Time Trial	Soviet Union; Nadesja Kibardina; Tamara Poliakova; Laima Zilporytė; Natalya Melekhina	-	Italy	-	France	-
