= Nadezhda Kibardina =

USSR cyclist

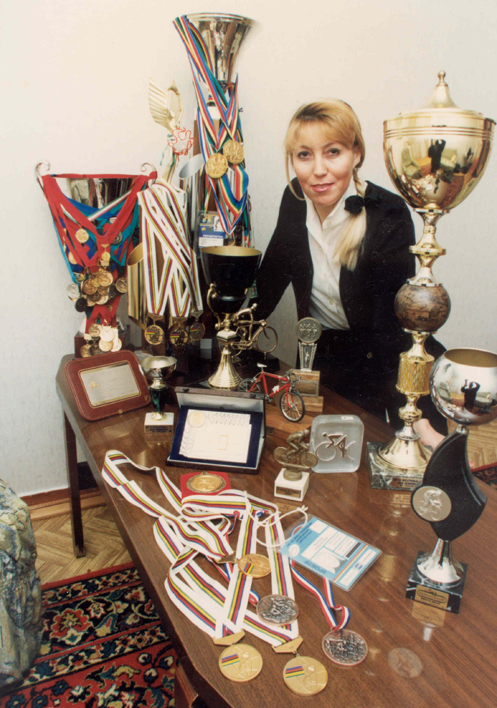
Medal record
Representing Soviet Union
Women's road cycling
World Championships
Gold medal – first place	1987 Villach	Team time trial
Gold medal – first place	1989 Chambéry	Team time trial
Silver medal – second place	1988 Ronse	Team time trial
Bronze medal – third place	1990 Utsunomiya	Team time trial
Bronze medal – third place	1991 Stuttgart	Team time trial
Women's track cycling
World Championships
Gold medal – first place	1980 Besançon	Individual pursuit
Gold medal – first place	1981 Brno	Individual pursuit
Representing Russia
Women's road cycling
World Championships
Bronze medal – third place	1992 Benidorm	Team time trial

Nadezhda Nikolaevna Kibardina (Russian: Надежда Николаевна Кибардина; born 8 February 1956) is a retired USSR female road and track cyclist and four-time world champion. In 1980 and in 1981 she became world champion on the track in the individual pursuit and she became world champion in 1987 and 1989 on the road in the team time trial. At the 1983 Summer Universiade she won the gold medal on the road in the women's road race and on the track in the women's individual pursuit and the silver medal in the women's 500 m time trial. In 1993 she won the time trial at the road national championships.

== See also ==
Nadezhda Kibardina at Cycling Archives (archive)
