= Aleksandra Koliaseva =

Russian racing cyclist

Personal information
- Born: 18 August 1968 (age 58) Izhevsk, Soviet Union

Cycling career
- Sport: Cycling
- Discipline: Road
- Role: Rider
Medal record
Representing Russia
Women's Road cycling
World Championships
Gold medal – first place	1993 Oslo	Team time trial
Gold medal – first place	1994 Agrigento	Team time trial
Bronze medal – third place	1992 Benidorm	Team time trial

Aleksandra Ivanovna Koliaseva (Russian: Александра Ивановна Колясева, born 18 August 1968) is a former Soviet Union and Russian road racing cyclist. She won a gold medal at the UCI Road World Championships in the team time trial in 1993 and 1994 and a bronze medal in 1992. In 1995 she became Russian national champion in the road race and in 1996 she won the Tour de l'Aude. She is the mother of racing cyclist Pavel Sivakov.

== Sources ==
1989
2nd Overall Giro d'Italia Femminile

1993
1st World Time Trial Championships

1994
1st World Time Trial Championships
1st Stage 2 (TTT) Tour de l'Aude Cycliste Féminin

1995
1st Overall Masters Féminin
1st National Road Race Championship

1996
1st Overall Tour de l'Aude Cycliste Féminin
1st Wiesbaden Criterium
