= Olga Sokolova (cyclist) =

Russian road racing cyclist

Personal information
- Born: December 26, 1969 (age 56) Russia

Cycling career
- Sport: Cycling
- Discipline: Road
- Role: Rider
Medal record
Representing Russia
Women's road cycling
World Championships
Gold medal – first place	1993 Oslo	Team time trial
Gold medal – first place	1994 Agrigento	Team time trial

Olga Sokolova (born 26 December 1969 in Russia) is a Russian road racing cyclist. She won a gold medal at the UCI Road World Championships in the team time trial in 1993 and 1994.
