= Claudia Lehmann =

German cyclist

Personal information
- Born: 23 April 1973 (age 53)

Cycling career
- Sport: Cycling
- Role: Rider

Claudia Lehmann (born 23 April 1973) is a German former professional racing cyclist. She won the German National Road Race Championship in 1993.
