= Nathalie Gendron =

French cyclist

Personal information
- Born: 9 July 1967 (age 59) Lingolsheim, France

Cycling career
- Sport: Cycling
- Discipline: Road
- Role: Rider
Medal record
Representing France
Women's Road cycling
World Championships
Gold medal – first place	1991 Stuttgart	Team time trial

Nathalie Gendron (born 9 July 1967) is a French road racing cyclist.

Born in Lingolsheim (Alsace), she won a gold medal at the 1991 UCI Road World Championships in the team time trial. She won also the Chrono des Herbiers in 1991. In 1993, she won at the French National Track Championships the individual pursuit.
