= Dede Barry =

American cyclist (born 1972)

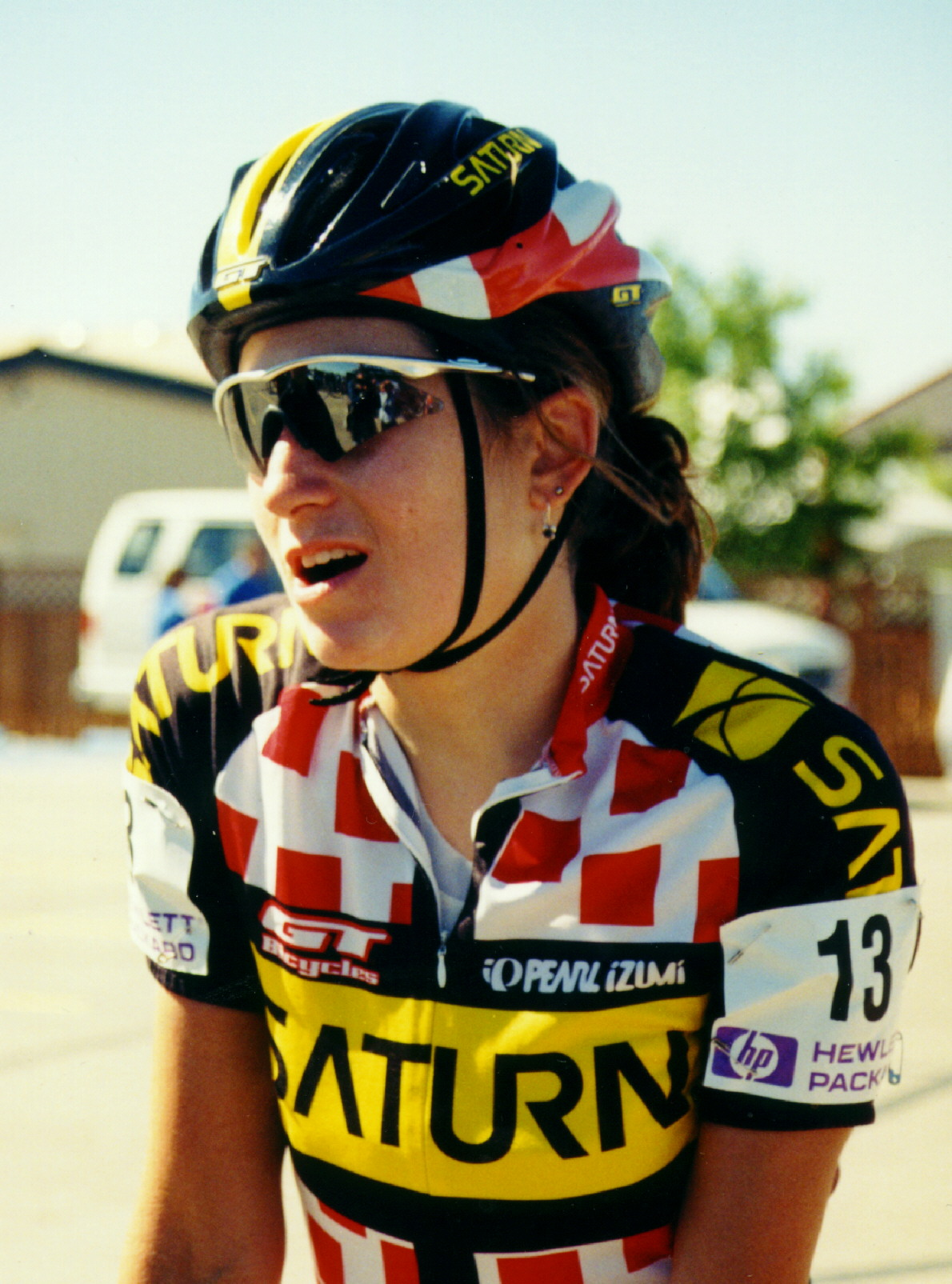
- Barry speaks with reporters prior to the 1998 Women's Challenge

Personal information
- Full name: Deirdre Barry
- Born: October 8, 1972 (age 54) Milwaukee, Wisconsin, U.S.

Cycling career
- Sport: Cycling
- Discipline: Road
- Role: Rider

Professional teams
- 1997–2000: Saturn
- 2002–2004: T-Mobile
Medal record
Women's road cycling
Representing the United States
Olympic Games
Silver medal – second place	2004 Athens	Time trial
World Championships
Bronze medal – third place	1994 Agrigento	Team time trial
Silver medal – second place	1993 Oslo	Team time trial

Deirdre "Dede" Demet Barry (born October 8, 1972 in Milwaukee, Wisconsin) is an American female cycle racer, six times U.S. champion (4 senior titles, two junior). She has won two World Cup races, two World Championship medals, and, in 2004, the silver medal in the time trial in the 2004 Olympic Games in Athens, Greece. She is married to fellow professional cyclist Michael Barry. They live in Toronto, Canada.

== Biography ==
Barry did not start as a cyclist. Her entry into sport was figure skating. All she wanted to do was race other youngsters to the end of the rink. Her coach suggested she take up speed skating, which she did, swayed by watching Eric and Beth Heiden in the world championships in her home town of Milwaukee. She was a member of the U.S. speedskating team from 1987 to 1991 and selected for the world championships in 1988–1991.

Having used cycling as training for skating, Barry switched completely, prompted by a cycling race series (Superweek) on streets in front of her childhood home. Other American cyclists who excelled in both sports include Eric and Beth Heiden, Chris Witty, Connie Carpenter-Phinney and Erin Mirabella.

Disappointed not to qualify for the Olympics in 1996 and 2000, Barry did not race in 2001 but came back strongly next year with victory in the Montreal World Cup, in which she used a steel Mariposa frame built by her father-in-law, Mike Barry.

Her biggest success came in 2004. Picked for the U.S. Olympic team after accumulating more UCI points than other riders, she came second in the individual time trial event.

She currently co-leads Mariposa Bicycles with her husband, Michael Barry in Toronto, Canada.

== Major results ==
1989
1st Road race, UCI Road World Championships, Junior
1st United States National Time Trial Championships
1st United States National Road Race Championships

1991
1st United States National Team Time Trial Championships
1st Team Time Trial, Pan American Games

1993
2nd World Team Time Trial Championships
1st United States National Team Time Trial Championships
1st Team Time Trial U.S. Olympic Festival

1994
3rd World Team Time Trial Championships
1st Killington Stage Race
4th United States National Time Trial Championships
2nd United States National Road Race Championships
3rd Women's Challenge

3 stage wins

5th Molenheike Stage Race

1 stage win

1995
3rd United States National Time Trial Championships
1st Time trial, Pan American Games
1st Women's Challenge

3 stage victories

1st Thrift Drug Invitational
3rd Colorado Cyclist Classic
4th Tour de l'Aude

2 stage wins

2nd Epinal Stage Race
1st 89er Stage Race

1 stage win

1996
1st United States National Road Race Championships
2nd Redlands Bicycle Classic

1st Climber's jersey

1997
1st Grand Prix Féminin du Canada

1st Points classification

2nd Stage 1

1st Stage 4
3rd Stage 3

Stage win Tour Cycliste Féminin
3rd Tour de 'Toona

1st Prologue time trial
2nd Stage 2

3rd United States National Road Race Championships
2nd United States National Time Trial Championships
2nd Fresca International Classic

3 stage wins

4th Fresca Tour of America

3rd Fresca Invitational (Seattle)
1st Fresca Classic (Racine)
1st Fresca Classic (Schlitz Park)
1st Fresca Classic (Lake Front)
2nd Fresca Classic (Alpine Valley)

3rd Stage 6, Women's Challenge (cat 1)
2nd Stage 8, Women's Challenge (cat 1)
5th CoreStates Liberty Classic
2nd Conyers and Pearman Grand Prix

1st Road race
2nd Criterium
3rd Time trial

2nd 89er Stage Race

1st Stage 3 (criterium)
2nd Stage 2 (time trial)
3rd Prologue

2nd Stage 3, Street Skills Women's Stage Race
2nd Stage 6, Street Skills Women's Stage Race
Stage victory (criterium), Redlands Bicycle Classic

1998
1st Sydney (Aus) World Cup
2nd UCI World Cup Overall
4th Beneden-Maas (Ned) World Cup
7th Thüringen-Rundfahrt
1st Fitchburg-Longsjo Classic

2nd Stage 1 (Royal Plaza time trial, 12.9 miles)
2nd Stage 3 (road race)

1st United States National Criterium Championships
3rd United States National Road Race Championships
4th United States National Time Trial Championships
7th Liberty Classic (USA) World Cup
3rd Wilmington Classic

2nd Stage 1 (time trial, 8.6 miles), Enchanted Mountain Stage Race
1st Stage 3 (criterium), Enchanted Mountain Stage Race

3rd Tour of Willamette

1st Stage 2
3rd Stage 4

1st Tour de Snowy

2nd Stage 3 (Berridale to Cabramurra)

4th Street Skills Stage Race

1st Stage 5 (Hamilton to Hautapu road race)

2nd Stage 4 (Beaver Criterium), Redlands Bicycle Classic

1999
1st BMC Tour of Houston
5th GP Feminin du Québec

3rd Stage 1 (Farnham road circuit race
1st Stage 4 (Bedford road circuit race

3 stage victories, Superweek
2nd Stage 7 (St. Lauret to Durban Corbières), Tour de l'Aude
2nd Tour of Willamette

1st Stage 1, (Hinman Vineyard road race)

1st Stage 2, (California Speedway time trial), Redlands Bicycle Classic

2000
7th Road race, UCI Road World Championships
6th Tour de Suisse Feminin (cat. 1)
5th Stage 5 (Burley South individual time trial), Women's Challenge (cat 1)
3rd Stage 8 (Letha to Firebird Raceway), Women's Challenge (cat 1)
4th Stage 10 (Idaho Statehouse criterium), Women's Challenge (cat 1)
4th United States National Time Trial Championships
5th Stage 5 (Castelnaudary time trial), Tour de l'Aude (cat 1)
2nd Tour of Willamette

1st Stage 6 (Brownsville road race)

2001
Barry did not race in 2001

2002
6th United States National Road Race Championships
4th United States National Time Trial Championships
3rd Liberty Classic (cat. 1)
2nd Le Tour du Montréal (cat. 2)

2nd Stage 1, Le Tour du Montréal, Lachine time trial, 3km
3rd Stage 2, Le Tour du Montréal, Little Italy circuit race

1st Montréal (Can) World Cup

2003
8th UCI Road World Championships – Women's time trial
2nd Giro della Toscana (cat 1)

1st Stage 4, Giro della Toscana

2004
2nd Olympic Games Time Trial
1st Sparkassen Giro Bochum
10th Tour de l'Aude

2 stage victories

4th Damesronde van Drenthe
