= Monique de Bruin (cyclist) =

Dutch cyclist

Personal information
- Born: 8 July 1965 (age 60) Hoogland, the Netherlands

Sport
- Sport: Cycling
Medal record
Representing the Netherlands
Road World Championships
Silver medal – second place	1991 Stuttgart	Team time trial
Track World Championships
Bronze medal – third place	1988 Ghent	Points race

Monique de Bruin (born 8 July 1965) is a retired Dutch road and track cyclist who was active between 1986 and 1993. On track, she won a bronze medal in the points race at the 1988 World Championships, whereas on the road her team was second at the 1991 UCI Road World Championships in the team time trial.

As a teenager de Bruin did skating, swimming, judo and gymnastics before turning to cycling at age 15. She took part in five Tour de France Féminin races and five road world championships. After retiring from competitions she worked as a secretary. She has two children.
