= 1994 UCI Road World Championships =

Cycling world championships

- Location within Sicily Location within Italy
- Venue: Agrigento, Italy
- Coordinates: 37°19′N 13°35′E
- Events: 7

The 1994 UCI Road World Championships took place in Agrigento, Italy between 21 and 28 August 1994.

In the same period, the 1994 UCI Track Cycling World Championships were also organized in Palermo.

== Events summary ==
Event	Gold		Silver		Bronze	
Men's Events
Men's road race	Luc Leblanc; France	6h33'54"	Claudio Chiappucci; Italy	+ 0'09"	Richard Virenque; France	s.t.
Men's time trial	Chris Boardman; Great Britain	49' 34"	Andrea Chiurato; Italy	+ 0'48"	Jan Ullrich; Germany	+ 1'51"
Men's team time trial	Italy; Salvato, Contri, Colombo, Andriotto	1h 57'54"	France; Anti, Bozzi, Deramé, Moreau	2h 00'42"	Germany; Grabsch, Peschel, Rich, Schaffrath	2h 00'55"
Amateur Road Race	Alex Pedersen; Denmark	4h24:38	Milan Dvorščík; Slovakia	s.t.	Christophe Mengin; France	s.t.
Women's Events
Women's road race	Monica Valvik; Norway	2h 8' 03"	Patsy Maegerman; Belgium	s.t.	Jeanne Golay; United States	s.t.
Women's time trial	Karen Kurreck; United States	38'22"	Anne Samplonius; Canada	+ 45"	Jeannie Longo; France	+ 1'22"
Women's team time trial	Russia; Olga Sokolova, Svetlana Bubnenkova, Valentina Polkhanova, Aleksandra Koliaseva	1h 04'55"	Lithuania; Jolanta Polikevičiūtė, Rasa Polikevičiūtė, Diana Žiliūtė, Liuda Triabaitė	1h 05'39"	United States; Deirdre Demet-Barry, Eve Stephenson, Jeannie Golay, Alison Dunlap	1h 05'53"
