= Ainhoa Artolazábal =

Spanish cyclist

Personal information
- Full name: Ainhoa Artolazábal Royo
- Born: 6 March 1972 (age 54) Tolosa, Spain

Cycling career
- Sport: Cycling
- Discipline: Road cycling
- Role: Rider

Ainhoa Artolazábal Royo (Note: In this Spanish name, the first or paternal surname is Artolazábal and the second or maternal family name is Royo.) (born 6 March 1972) is a road cyclist from Spain. She represented her nation at the 1992 Summer Olympics in the women's road race.
