= Janice Bolland =

American racing cyclist

Personal information
- Born: January 25, 1966 (age 60) Cheyenne, Wyoming

Cycling career
- Sport: Cycling
- Discipline: Road
- Role: Rider
Medal record
Women's road cycling
Representing United States
World Championships
| Gold medal – first place | 1992 Benidorm | Team time trial |
| Silver medal – second place | 1993 Oslo | Team time trial |

Janice Bolland (born January 25, 1966) is an American road racing cyclist. She won a gold medal at the 1992 UCI Road World Championships in the team time trial and a silver medal in the team time trial in 1993.
