= 1993 UCI Road World Championships =

Cycling world championships

- Venue: Oslo, Norway
- Date: 17–29 August 1993
- Coordinates: 59°54′50″N 10°45′8″E
- Events: 5

The 1993 UCI Road World Championships took place in Oslo, Norway between 25–29 August 1993.

In the same period, the 1993 UCI Track Cycling World Championships were organized in Hamar, Norway.

== Events summary ==
Event	Gold		Silver		Bronze	
Men's Events
Men's Professional road race	Lance Armstrong; United States	6h 17' 10"	Miguel Indurain; Spain	+ 19"	Olaf Ludwig; Germany	s.t.
Men's team time trial	Italy; Salvato, Contri, Brasi, Fina	-	Germany; Meyer, Peschel, Rich, Walzer	-	Switzerland; Jeker, Meister, Kennel, Meier	-
Men's Amateur road race	Jan Ullrich; Germany	-	Kaspars Ozers; Latvia	s.t.	Lubor Tesar; Czech Republic	s.t.
Women's Events
Women's road race	Leontien van Moorsel; Netherlands	2h 21' 20"	Jeannie Longo; France	s.t.	Laura Charameda; United States	+ 4"
Women's team time trial	Russia; Olga Sokolova, Swetlana Bubnenkova, Valentina Polkhanova, Aleksandra Koliaseva	-	United States; Deirdre Demet-Barry, Eve Stephenson, Jeannie Golay, Janice Bolland	-	Italy; Roberta Bonanomi, Alessandra Cappellotto, Michela Fanini, Fabiana Luperini	-

== Medals table ==
Place	Nation	1st place, gold medalist(s)	2nd place, silver medalist(s)	3rd place, bronze medalist(s)	Total
1	United States	1	1	1	3
1	Germany	1	1	1	3
3	Italy	1	0	1	2
4	Russia	1	0	0	1
4	Netherlands	1	0	0	1
6	France	0	1	0	1
6	Latvia	0	1	0	1
6	Spain	0	1	0	1
9	Czech Republic	0	0	1	1
9	Switzerland	0	0	1	1
Total		5	5	5	15
