= Bunki Bankaitis-Davis =

American cyclist (1958–2021)

Danute Bankaitis-Davis
Personal information
- Nickname: Bunki
- Born: January 2, 1958 United States
- Died: January 29, 2021 (aged 63)

Cycling career
- Sport: Cycling
- Discipline: Road
- Role: Rider
Medal record
Women's road cycling
Representing United States
World Championships
Gold medal – first place	1992 Benidorm	Team time trial

Danute "Bunki" Bankaitis-Davis (January 2, 1958 – January 29, 2021) was an American road racing cyclist. She won a gold medal at the 1992 UCI Road World Championships in the team time trial. She competed at the 1988 Summer Olympics in the women's road race finishing 14th.

Born to Lithuanian parents, Bunki Bankaitis-Davis competed in the women’s road race at the 1988 Seoul Olympics, finishing 14th. She started out as a volleyball player, earning a scholarship to Cleveland State University where she studied chemistry. Bankaitis-Davis later earned a PhD in organic chemistry from the University of North Carolina. She started working with Amgen in Boulder, Colorado, but left after several years and started her own company, Source Molecular Diagnostics, which does molecular blood tests.

She was inducted into the United States Bicycling Hall of Fame in 2021.
