= Inga Thompson =

American racing cyclist (born 1964)

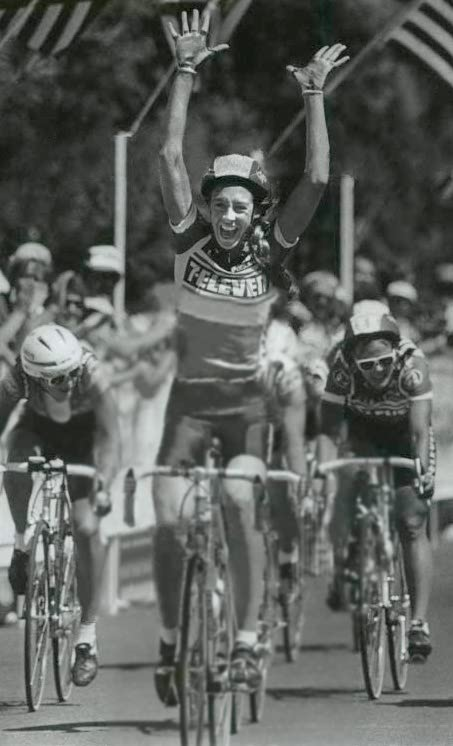
- Thompson winning the road race at the 1988 Olympic trials

Personal information
- Born: January 27, 1964 (age 62) Salt Lake City, Utah, U.S.
- Height: 178 cm (5 ft 10 in)
- Weight: 61 kg (134 lb)

Cycling career
- Sport: Cycling
- Current team: Retired
- Role: Rider
Medal record
Representing United States
UCI Road World Championships
Silver medal – second place	1987 Villach	Team time trial
Silver medal – second place	1990 Utsunomiua	Team time trial
Silver medal – second place	1991 Stuttgart	Road race
Pan American Games
Silver medal – second place	1987 Indianapolis	Road race

Kristin Inga Thompson (born January 27, 1964) is a retired road bicycle racer. She competed at the 1984, 1988 and 1992 Olympics with the best result of eighth place in 1988. She won silver medals at the UCI Road World Championships in 1987, 1990 and 1991, and placed third at the Tour de France in 1986 and 1989. Nationally she won United States National Road Race Championships in 1987, 1988, 1990, 1991 and 1993.

Inga Thompson was inducted into the U.S. Bicycling Hall of Fame in 2014.

== Activism ==
In 2019 Thompson obtained the signatures of over 80 Olympians on a petition to the IOC to limit women's categories to cisgender women. She maintains that women's voices have been silenced. Thompson continues her work with Nancy Hogshead-Makar, Alison Sydor, Martina Navratilova, Sharron Davies, and many prominent women athletes to advocate for categories separated by sex.

Also in 2019 Thompson was interviewed for an article opposing participation of transgender women in women's cycling events, and instead advocating for a separate transgender category. This prompted an outcry from members of the Oregon Bicycle Racing Association who called for her removal from the organization's board of directors, as her statements did not align with the policies of the organization. While the board initially voted to retain her as a board member, she resigned 3 days later.

The UCI has ruled in July 2023 that transgender people are not allowed to race in elite women's fields. American pro women’s cycling team Cynisca Cycling has confirmed that the ex-pro American cyclist is no longer on their board of directors. “Ms. Thompson is entitled to her opinions and advocacy, but her methods and personal attacks are inconsistent with Cynisca’s mission to advance opportunities for women. Those methods, well-documented on Ms. Thompson’s social media presence, include dehumanization of transgender people, spreading misinformation, demagoguery, and personal attacks on anyone who opposes her views,” the team said. Chris Gutowsky, owner of Cynisca, was sanctioned by Safe Sports for harassment and bullying of Ms Thompson.

== Major results ==
1984

- 21st – 1984 Los Angeles Olympics

1985

- 13th – World Championships (Road Race)

1986

- 3rd – Grande Boucle (Tour de France Feminine)2 Stage Wins Individual Time Trial

1987

- 1st – National Championships (Individual Time Trial)
- 1st – National Championships (Team Time Trial)
- 2nd – World Championships (Team Time Trial)
- 2nd – Pan American Games (Road Race)

1988

- 1st – National Championships (Road Race)
- 1st – USCF Olympic Trials (Road Race)
- 8th – 1988 Summer Olympics
- 1st – Coors Classic Overall G.C.

1989

- 1st – National Championships (Time Trials)
- 3rd – Grande Boucle (Tour de France Feminine)

1990

- 2nd – World Championships (Team Time Trial)
- 1st – National Championships (Team Time Trials)
- 1st – National Championships (Individual Time Trial)
- 1st – Ore-Ida Women's Challenge, Overall G.C., Longest Women's Stage Race in the World (17 stages, 663 miles (1,067 km)

1991

- 1st – National Championships (Road Race)
- 1st – National Championships (Time Trials)(National Record)
- 2nd – World Championships (Road Race)

1992

- 26th – 1992 Barcelona Olympics
- 2nd – National Championships (Road Race)
- 1st – Olympic Trials (Road Race)
- 1st – US National Rankings.

1993

- 1st – National Championships (Road Race)
