= Eve Stephenson =

American racing cyclist

Personal information
- Born: September 18, 1969 (age 57) United States

Cycling career
- Sport: Cycling
- Discipline: Road
- Role: Rider
Medal record
Women's road cycling
Representing United States
World Championships
Gold medal – first place	1992 Benidorm	Team time trial
Silver medal – second place	1990 Utsunomiya	Team time trial
Silver medal – second place	1993 Oslo	Team time trial
Bronze medal – third place	1994 Agrigento	Team time trial

Eve Stephenson (born September 18, 1969) is an American who competed as a road racing cyclist. She won a gold medal at the 1992 UCI Road World Championships in the team time trial. She also won silver medals in the team time trial in 1990 and 1993 and a bronze one in 1994.
