= Svetlana Bubnenkova =

Russian cyclist

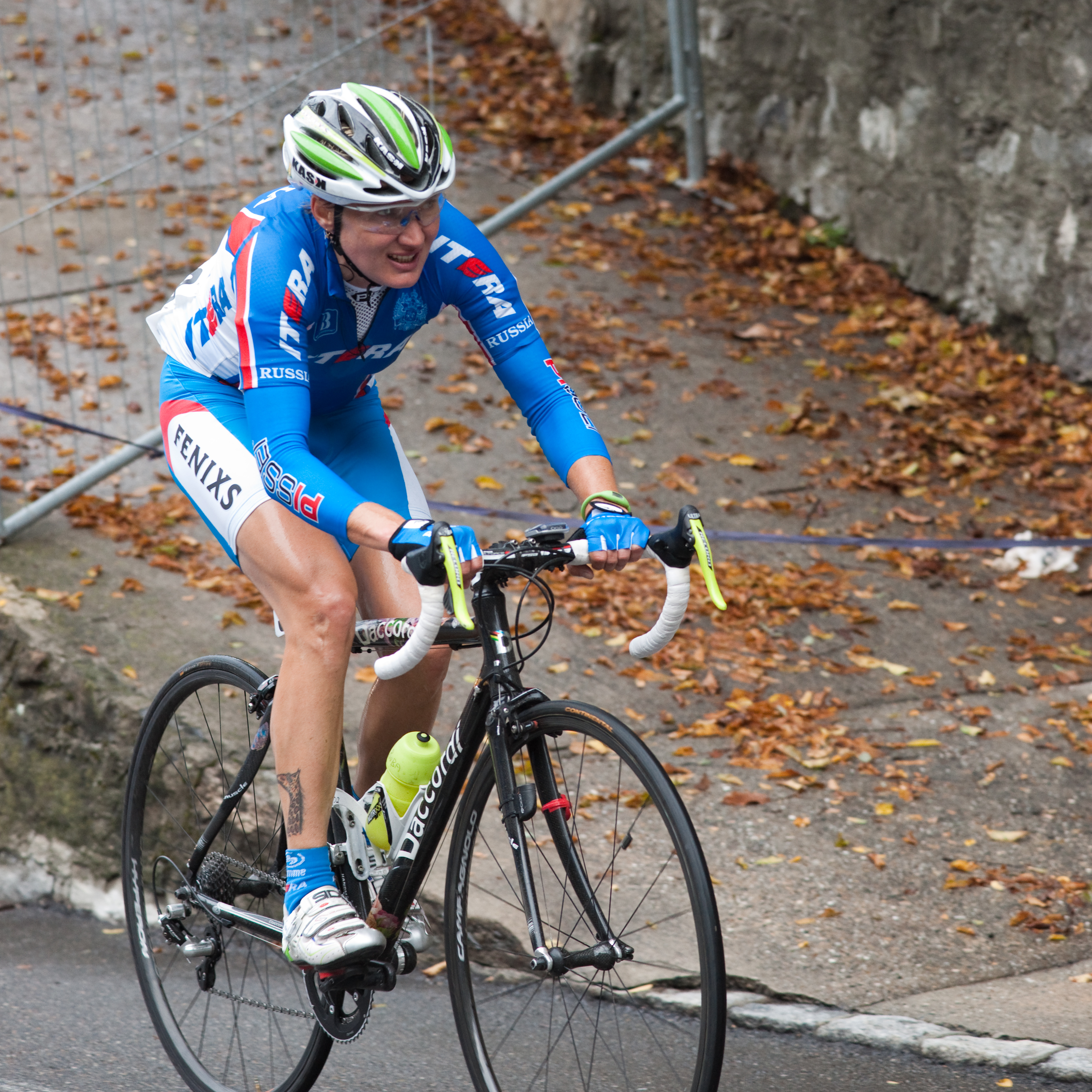

Personal information
- Full name: Svetlana Yuryevna Bubnenkova-Stolbova
- Nickname: Bouba
- Born: January 2, 1973 (age 53) Russia
- Height: 1.69 m (5 ft 6 1/2 in)
- Weight: 60 kg (132 lb)

Cycling career
- Sport: Cycling

Major wins
- UCI Road Team Time Trial (1993, 1994); Giro d'Italia Femminile (2002)

Svetlana Yuryevna Bubnenkova-Stolbova (Russian Светлана Юрьевна Бубненкова; born 2 January 1973 in Izhevsk, Udmurtia) is a racing cyclist from Russia. She represented her native country at three Summer Olympics: 1996, 2000 and 2004. Her biggest achievement was winning the 2002 Giro d'Italia Femminile. Bubnenkova twice won the world title in the women's team time trial (1993, 1994). She tested positive for the use of EPO in the Tour Féminin en Limousin 2006. In June 2007 she was suspended for two years by the French doping association. Later the UCI adopted this suspension, but due to miscommunications Bubnenkova continued to race in 2007. At the end of 2007 the UCI disqualified Bubnenkova in all races she started between June and September 2007.

== Major results ==
1993
1st World Team Time Trial Championships

with Olga Sokolova, Valentina Polkhanova & Aleksandra Koliaseva

1st Chrono Champenois-Trophée Européen
2nd National Time Trial Championships
1994
1st World Team Time Trial Championships

with Olga Sokolova, Valentina Polkhanova & Aleksandra Koliaseva

1st National Time Trial Championships
1st overall Tour de Bretagne
2nd National Road Race Championships
2nd Chrono Champenois-Trophée Européen
1995
3rd Eschborn–Frankfurt City Loop
3rd overall Tour de l'Aude Cycliste Féminin
3rd National Time Trial Championships
1996
1st National Road Race Championships
2nd overall Tour de l'Aude Cycliste Féminin
18th Olympic Games Time Trial
1997
2nd overall Tour de l'Aude Cycliste Féminin
1999
2nd overall Giro d'Italia Femminile
2nd overall Giro del Trentino
2000
1st stage 7 Grande Boucle Féminine Internationale
1st stage 6A & 7 Giro d'Italia Femminile
1st National Road Race Championships
3rd overall Giro del Trentino
5th Olympic Games Road Race
2001
2nd National Road Race Championships
2002
1st overall Giro d'Italia Femminile

1st stage 3 & 6

1st National Road Race Championships
1st Trofeo Alfredo Binda
1st GP Suisse Féminin
3rd National Time Trial Championships
2003
1st Bern-Oberbottigen
1st National Road Race Championships
1st National Time Trial Championships
1st Sparkassen Giro Bochum
3rd Berner Rundfahrt
2004
2nd National Time Trial Championships
8th World Road Cycling Championships
2005
1st overall Emakumeen Euskal Bira

1st stage 1

1st overall Giro del Trentino

1st prologue

1st National Time Trial Championships
1st stage 8 Giro d'Italia Femminile
1st stage 2, 3, 4 & 5 Tour de l'Ardèche
2nd overall Giro della Toscana Int. Femminile
1st stage 3
3rd National Road Race Championships
3rd overall Giro di San Marino
9th UCI Road World Championships – Women's time trial
2006
1st overall Giro di San Marino

1st stage 2

1st overall Giro del Trentino

1st stage 1 & 2

1st Overall Giro della Toscana Int. Femminile

1st stage 5

2nd Russian National Time Trial Championships
2nd overall Tour Féminin en Limousin
3rd overall Geelong Tour
3rd Coppa dei Laghi
3rd overall Route de France Féminine

1st stage 8

9th World Road Cycling Championships
2007
1st Futur Géant de la Route CC Hollerich
~~1st stage 8 Giro d'Italia Femminile~~
~~1st Critérium International Feminin~~
~~1st overall Tour Féminin en Limousin~~

~~1st stage 1 & 4~~

~~1st Critérium des Championnes~~
~~2nd National Time Trial Championships~~
~~2nd overall Route de France Féminine~~

~~1st stage 2, 5, 6 & 7~~

~~2nd Trophée des Cyclistines~~
~~3rd overall Giro del Trentino~~
2009
1st GP Elsy Jacobs
1st Classic Féminine Vienne Poitou-Charentes
3rd overall Giro del Trentino
3rd National Time Trial Championships
2010
3rd overall Giro del Trentino
2011
2nd National Road Race Championships
3rd overall Gracia–Orlová

1st prologue

3rd Russian National Track Cycling Championships (team pursuit)

with Natalia Boyarskaya & Irina Molicheva

2012
5th World Team Time Trial Championships

with Boyarskaya, Kasper, Kupfernagel, Molicheva & Zabelinsaya

2013
1st National Road Race Championships
3rd overall Tour de Bretagne Féminin
