= Aiga Zagorska =

Lithuanian cyclist (born 1970)

Personal information
- Born: 28 March 1970 (age 56) Tukums, Latvian SSR
- Height: 1.63 m (5 ft 4 in)
- Weight: 56 kg (123 lb)

Cycling career
- Sport: Cycling
- Current team: Retired
Medal record
World Road Championships
Bronze medal – third place	1991 Stuttgart	Team Time Trial

Aiga Zagorska (born 28 March 1970) is a retired female track and road racing cyclist from Latvia, who competed at the 1992 Summer Olympics in Barcelona, Spain for Lithuania. She finished in 14th place in the women's individual road race.
