= Gunhild Ørn =

Norwegian cyclist

Personal information
- Born: 22 March 1970 (age 56) Stavanger, Norway

Cycling career
- Sport: Cycling

Gunhild Ørn (born 22 March 1970) is a Norwegian cyclist. She was born in Stavanger. She competed in the 1992 Summer Olympics in Barcelona.
