= Monique Knol =

Dutch cyclist

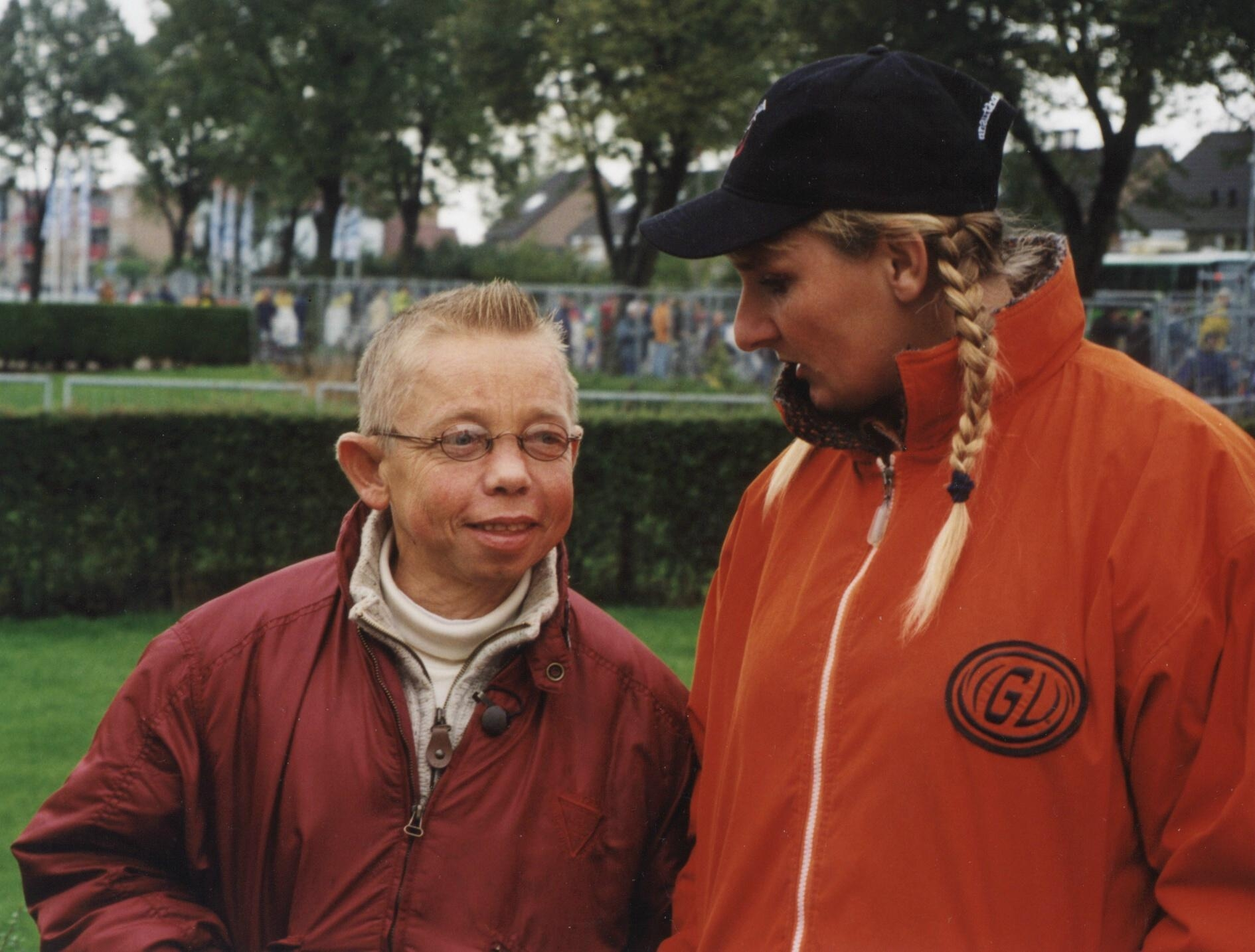
- Bart de Graaff and Monique Knol

Personal information
- Full name: Monique Knol
- Born: 31 March 1964 (age 62) Wolvega, Netherlands

Cycling career
- Sport: Cycling
- Discipline: Road
- Role: Rider
Medal record
Representing the Netherlands
Women's Road bicycle racing
Olympic Games
Gold medal – first place	1988 Seoul	Individual road race
Bronze medal – third place	1992 Barcelona	Individual road race

Monique Knol (born 31 March 1964 in Wolvega, Friesland) is a former racing cyclist from the Netherlands, who won a medal in two consecutive Summer Olympics (gold and bronze), starting in 1988 in Seoul, South Korea. There she won the road race, taking a bronze in the same event four years later in Barcelona, Spain. She later retired from competitive cycling.

== Major results ==
1987
Postgiro féminin

1st Stage 3 & 4

Tour de France Femmes

1st Stage 2 & 8

1st Prologue Tour de l'Aude Cycliste Féminin
1988
1st Road race, National Road Championships
Tour de France Femmes

1st Prologue & Stage 2

1st Road race, Olympic Games
1989
Tour de l'Aude Cycliste Féminin

1st Prologue & Stage 7

Postgiro féminin

1st Stage 2 & 4

Tour de France Femmes

1st Stage 1,2,10 & 11

1990
1st Stage 3 Tour de l'Aude Cycliste Féminin
1991
National Road Championships

2nd Road race
3rd Time trial

1992
Tour de l'Aude Cycliste Féminin

1st Stage 1 & 6

3rd Road race, Olympic Games
National Road Championships

3rd Road race
4th Time trial

1993
Tour de l'Aude Cycliste Féminin

1st Stage 1a & 2

== See also ==
- List of Dutch Olympic cyclists
