= Cora Westland =

Dutch cyclist (born 1962)

Personal information
- Born: 28 October 1962 (age 63) Bussum, Netherlands

Cycling career
- Sport: Cycling

Cora Westland (born 28 October 1962) is a Dutch former cyclist. She competed in the women's individual road race at the 1988 Summer Olympics.
