= Teodora Ruano =

Spanish cyclist

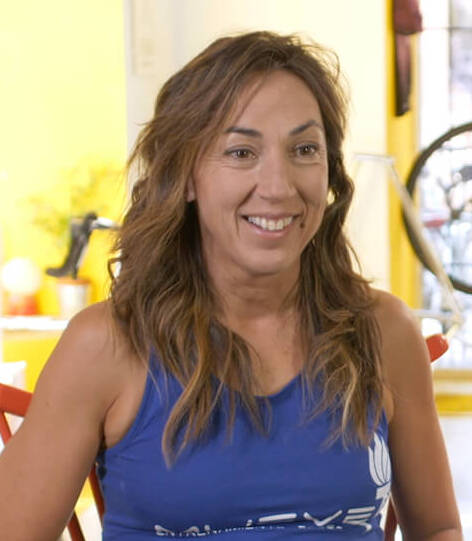
- Dori Ruano (2019)

Personal information
- Full name: María Teodora Adoracion Ruano Sanchón
- Nickname: Dori
- Born: 11 January 1969 (age 57) Villamayor de Armuña, Spain
- Height: 1.68 m (5 ft 6 in)
- Weight: 51 kg (112 lb)

Cycling career
- Sport: Cycling
- Current team: retired

Major wins
- World Track Champion Points Race (1998)

María Teodora Adoracion ("Dori") Ruano Sanchón (born 11 January 1969) is a retired female track and road racing cyclist from Spain. She represented her native country at three Summer Olympics: in 1992, 2000, and 2004. Her biggest achievement was winning the world title in the women's points race at the 1998 UCI Track Cycling World Championships.

== Major results ==
2001
3rd UCI Road World Championships – Women's time trial
2003
9th UCI Road World Championships – Women's time trial
