= Jeanne Golay =

American cyclist

Personal information
- Full name: Jeanne Marie Golay
- Born: April 16, 1962 (age 64) Coral Gables, Florida, U.S.

Cycling career
- Sport: Cycling
- Current team: Retired
- Discipline: Road
- Role: Rider

Major wins
- United States National Road Race Championships: 1992; 1994; 1995; World Team Time Trial Championship: 1992
Medal record
Women's road cycling
Representing United States
World Championships
Gold medal – first place	1992 Benidorm	Team time trial
Bronze medal – third place	1994 Agrigento	Road race
Bronze medal – third place	1994 Agrigento	Team time trial
Pan American Games
Gold medal – first place	1991 Havana	Team time trial
Gold medal – first place	1991 Havana	Road race
Gold medal – first place	1995 Mar del Plata	Road race

Jeanne Marie Golay (born April 16, 1962) is an American former road bicycle racing professional from Coral Gables, Florida. She won the 1992, 1994 and 1995 United States National Road Race Championships, and the 1992 world team time-trial championship, and competed in the 1992 Barcelona Olympics and 1996 Atlanta Olympics. In 2008, in Davis California, she was inducted into the United States Bicycling Hall of Fame in the category Modern Road & Track Competitor.

In Glenwood Springs, Colorado, a training and exercise trail formerly known as Red Mountain Trail has been renamed the Jeanne Golay Trail.

== Major results ==
1988

- 1st place in USA National Rankings, USA.

1989

- 1st place in (United States) National Time Trial Championships – Individual (ITT), USA.

1990

- 1st place in (United States) National Time Trial Championships – Team (TTT), USA.

Tested positive for steroids in 1990, pulled from TTT Team

1991

- 1st place in Tour of the Alpine Banks, USA.
- 1st place in (United States) National Time Trial Championships – Team (TTT), USA.
- 1st place in Pan American Games (TTT), Cuba.
- 1st place in Pan American Games (RR), Cuba.
- 1st place in Brick Criterium, USA

1992

- 1st place in Westfriese Tweedaagse, Holland.
- 1st place in Brecht, Belgium.
- 1st place in Omloop Van Het Molenheike, Holland.
- 1st place in (United States) National Time Trial Championships – Individual (ITT), USA.
- 1st place in (United States) National Time Trial Championships – Team (TTT), USA.
- 1st place in (United States) National Road Championships, USA.
- 1st place in World Time Trial Championships – Team (TTT), Spain.
- USCF Athlete of the Year Award.

1993

- 1st place in Mike Nields Memorial, USA.
- 1st place in International Idaho Women's Challenge, USA.
- 1st place in Athens Zanesville, USA.

1994

- 1st place in Redlands Bicycle Classic, USA.
- 1st place in Dole Cycling Classic, USA.
- 1st place in Electricity City Challenge, USA.
- 1st place in Tour of Somerville, USA.
- 1st place in (United States) National Road Championships, USA.
- 1st place in Korbel Champagne Cup Series, USA.
- 1st place in USA National Rankings.
- 3rd place in UCI Road World Championships – Women's Road Race

1995

- 1st place in Pan American Games, (RR), Argentina.
- 1st place in Sequoia Cycling Classic, USA.
- 1st place in (United States) National Road Championships, USA.
- 1st place in Frigidaire Cycling Classic, USA.
- 1st place in Colorado Cycling Classic, USA.
- 1st place in Fresca Cup, USA.
- 1st place in USA National Rankings.
- 6th place UCI Road World Championships – Women's time trial

1996

- 1st place in Valley of the Sun, USA.
- 1st place in (United States) National Criterium Championships, USA.
