= Cécile Odin =

French cyclist

Personal information
- Born: 4 October 1965 (age 61) Beauvais, France

Cycling career
- Sport: Cycling

Cécile Odin (born 4 October 1965) is a French international cyclist active from 1983 to 1996. Odin raced in two Olympic Games, Los Angeles 1984 and Seoul 1988, finishing 11th & 28th in the Women's Road Race. She made 3rd place overall in the Women's Tour de France (Grande Boucle) in 1985 and 1994, winning stage 6 in 1994. She won a World Championship in 1991 as part of the French Women's Team Time Trial Team.
