= UCI Road World Championships – Women's time trial =

Road bicycle racing competition

UCI Road World Championships – Women's Time Trial
- Rainbow jersey

Race details
- Date: September–October
- Discipline: Time Trial
- Type: One-day
- Organiser: Union Cycliste Internationale (UCI)

History
- First edition: 1994
- Editions: 33 (as of 2026)
- First winner: Karen Kurreck (USA)
- Most wins: Jeannie Longo (FRA) (4 wins)
- Most recent: Marlen Reusser (SUI)

The UCI Road World Championships - Women's time trial is the women's world championship for the road bicycle racing discipline of time trial. The event is organised by the Union Cycliste Internationale (UCI), cycling's international governing body, and has run annually each year starting in 1994. The event consists of a time trial, typically covering a distance of 30–40 kilometres (19–25 mi), where the rider completing the course in the shortest time is the winner.

France's Jeannie Longo holds the record for most victories with four: winning in 1995, 1996, 1997, and 2001. Germany's Judith Arndt has the most total medals with seven: two gold, three silver, and two bronze.

Since 2022, competitors in the event under the age of 23 at the end of the previous year are also eligible for honours in the women's under-23 time trial classification.

== Medallists ==
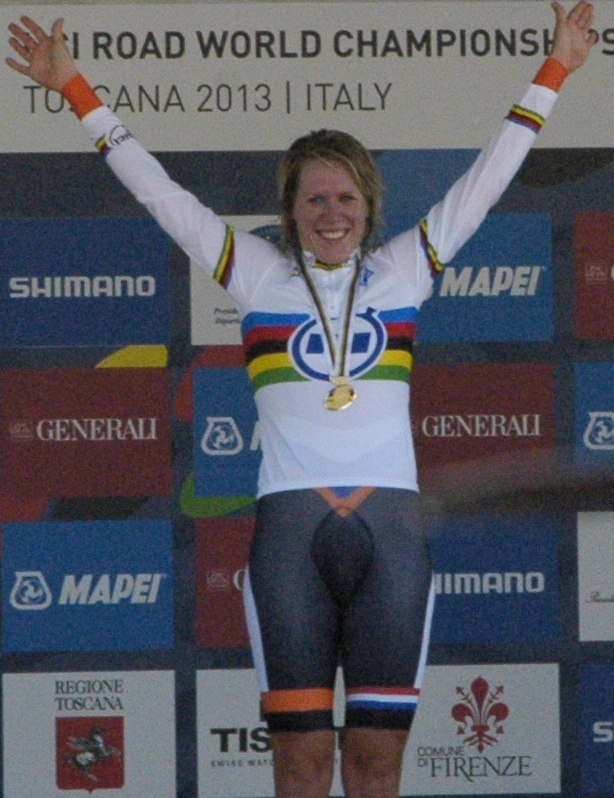
Ellen van Dijk won in 2013 (pictured), 2021, and 2022.

Women's time trial medallists
| Year | Gold | Time | Silver | Margin | Bronze | Margin | Distance | Location | Ref. |
|---|---|---|---|---|---|---|---|---|---|
| 1994 | Karen Kurreck (USA) | 38' 22" | Anne Samplonius (CAN) | + 0' 44" | Jeannie Longo (FRA) | + 1' 21" | 30.0 km (18.6 mi) | Agrigento, Italy | |
| 1995 | Jeannie Longo (FRA) | 44' 27" | Clara Hughes (CAN) | + 1' 11" | Kathryn Watt (AUS) | + 1' 25" | 26.1 km (16.2 mi) | Duitama, Colombia | |
| 1996 | Jeannie Longo (FRA) | 35' 16" | Catherine Marsal (FRA) | + 0' 49" | Alessandra Cappellotto (ITA) | + 0' 54" | 26.4 km (16.4 mi) | Lugano, Switzerland | |
| 1997 | Jeannie Longo (FRA) | 39' 15" | Zulfiya Zabirova (RUS) | + 0" (Note: Longo finished 0' 00" 85"' ahead of Zabirova.) | Judith Arndt (GER) | + 0' 29" | 28.0 km (17.4 mi) | San Sebastián, Spain | |
| 1998 | Leontien Zijlaard-Van Moorsel (NED) | 31' 51" | Zulfiya Zabirova (RUS) | + 0" (Note: Zijlaard-Van Moorsel finished 0' 00" 37"' ahead of Zabirova.) | Hanka Kupfernagel (GER) | + 0' 02" | 23.0 km (14.3 mi) | Valkenburg, Netherlands | |
| 1999 | Leontien Zijlaard-Van Moorsel (NED) | 32' 31" | Anna Wilson (AUS) | + 0' 04" | Edita Pučinskaitė (LTU) | + 0' 31" | 25.8 km (16.0 mi) | Verona, Italy | |
| 2000 | Mari Holden (USA) | 33' 14" | Jeannie Longo (FRA) | + 0' 03" | Rasa Polikevičiūtė (LTU) | + 0' 46" | 24.5 km (15.2 mi) | Plouay, France | |
| 2001 | Jeannie Longo (FRA) | 29' 08" | Nicole Brändli (SUI) | + 0' 04" | Teodora Ruano (ESP) | + 0' 44" | 19.2 km (11.9 mi) | Lisbon, Portugal | |
| 2002 | Zulfiya Zabirova (RUS) | 32' 02" | Nicole Brändli (SUI) | + 0' 14" | Karin Thürig (SUI) | + 0' 17" | 23.2 km (14.4 mi) | Heusden-Zolder, Belgium | |
| 2003 | Joane Somarriba (ESP) | 28' 23" | Judith Arndt (GER) | + 0' 10" | Zulfiya Zabirova (RUS) | + 0' 26" | 20.8 km (12.9 mi) | Hamilton, Canada | |
| 2004 | Karin Thürig (SUI) | 30' 53" | Judith Arndt (GER) | + 0' 51" | Zulfiya Zabirova (RUS) | + 0' 56" | 24.0 km (14.9 mi) | Verona, Italy | |
| 2005 | Karin Thürig (SUI) | 28' 51" | Joane Somarriba (ESP) | + 0' 05" | Kristin Armstrong (USA) | + 0' 39" | 21.9 km (13.6 mi) | Madrid, Spain | |
| 2006 | Kristin Armstrong (USA) | 35' 04" | Karin Thürig (SUI) | + 0' 25" | Christine Thorburn (USA) | + 0' 29" | 26.1 km (16.2 mi) | Salzburg, Austria | |
| 2007 | Hanka Kupfernagel (GER) | 34' 43" | Kristin Armstrong (USA) | + 0' 23" | Christiane Soeder (AUT) | + 0' 41" | 25.1 km (15.6 mi) | Stuttgart, Germany | |
| 2008 | Amber Neben (USA) | 33' 51" | Christiane Soeder (AUT) | + 0' 07" | Judith Arndt (GER) | + 0' 22" | 25.1 km (15.6 mi) | Varese, Italy | |
| 2009 | Kristin Armstrong (USA) | 35' 26" | Noemi Cantele (ITA) | + 0' 55" | Linda Villumsen (DEN) | + 0' 58" | 26.8 km (16.7 mi) | Mendrisio, Switzerland | |
| 2010 | Emma Pooley (GBR) | 32' 48" | Judith Arndt (GER) | + 0' 15" | Linda Villumsen (NZL) | + 0' 15" | 22.8 km (14.2 mi) | Geelong, Australia | |
| 2011 | Judith Arndt (GER) | 37' 07" | Linda Villumsen (NZL) | + 0' 21" | Emma Pooley (GBR) | + 0' 24" | 27.8 km (17.3 mi) | Copenhagen, Denmark | |
| 2012 | Judith Arndt (GER) | 32' 26" | Evelyn Stevens (USA) | + 0' 33" | Linda Villumsen (NZL) | + 0' 40" | 24.3 km (15.1 mi) | Valkenburg, Netherlands | |
| 2013 | Ellen van Dijk (NED) | 28' 47" | Linda Villumsen (NZL) | + 0' 24" | Carmen Small (USA) | + 0' 28" | 22.0 km (13.7 mi) | Florence, Italy | |
| 2014 | Lisa Brennauer (GER) | 38' 44" | Hanna Solovey (UKR) | + 0' 18" | Evelyn Stevens (USA) | + 0' 21" | 29.5 km (18.3 mi) | Ponferrada, Spain | |
| 2015 | Linda Villumsen (NZL) | 40' 29" | Anna van der Breggen (NED) | + 0' 02" | Lisa Brennauer (GER) | + 0' 05" | 29.9 km (18.6 mi) | Richmond, Virginia, United States | |
| 2016 | Amber Neben (USA) | 44' 42" | Ellen van Dijk (NED) | + 0' 05" | Katrin Garfoot (AUS) | + 0' 08" | 28.9 km (18.0 mi) | Doha, Qatar | |
| 2017 | Annemiek van Vleuten (NED) | 28' 50" | Anna van der Breggen (NED) | + 0' 12" | Katrin Garfoot (AUS) | + 0' 19" | 21.1 km (13.1 mi) | Bergen, Norway | |
| 2018 | Annemiek van Vleuten (NED) | 34' 25" | Anna van der Breggen (NED) | + 0' 29" | Ellen van Dijk (NED) | + 1' 25" | 27.7 km (17.2 mi) | Innsbruck, Austria | |
| 2019 | Chloé Dygert (USA) | 42' 11" | Anna van der Breggen (NED) | + 1' 32" | Annemiek van Vleuten (NED) | + 1' 52" | 30.4 km (18.9 mi) | Yorkshire, United Kingdom | |
| 2020 | Anna van der Breggen (NED) | 40' 20" | Marlen Reusser (SUI) | + 0' 15" | Ellen van Dijk (NED) | + 0' 31" | 31.7 km (19.7 mi) | Imola, Italy | |
| 2021 | Ellen van Dijk (NED) | 36' 05" | Marlen Reusser (SUI) | + 0' 10" | Annemiek van Vleuten (NED) | + 0' 24" | 30.3 km (18.8 mi) | Brugge, Belgium | |
| 2022 | Ellen van Dijk (NED) | 44' 28" | Grace Brown (AUS) | + 0' 13" | Marlen Reusser (SUI) | + 0' 42" | 34.2 km (21.3 mi) | Wollongong, Australia | |
| 2023 | Chloe Dygert (USA) | 46' 59" | Grace Brown (AUS) | + 0' 06" | Christina Schweinberger (AUT) | + 1' 13" | 36.2 km (22.5 mi) | Stirling, Scotland, UK | |
| 2024 | Grace Brown (AUS) | 39' 16" | Demi Vollering (NED) | + 0' 16" | Chloe Dygert (USA) | + 0' 56" | 29.9 km (18.6 mi) | Zurich, Switzerland | |
| 2025 | Marlen Reusser (SUI) | 43' 09" | Anna van der Breggen (NED) | + 0' 52" | Demi Vollering (NED) | + 1' 05" | 31.2 km (19.4 mi) | Kigali, Rwanda | |
| 2026 | Marlen Reusser (SUI) | 50' 25" | Zoe Bäckstedt (GBR) | + 0' 40" | Franziska Koch (GER) | + 0' 46" | 39.2 km (24.4 mi) | Montreal, Canada | |

=== Most successful cyclists ===
Most successful Women's time trial cyclists
| Rank | Cyclist | Gold | Silver | Bronze | Total | Gold medal-winning places |
|---|---|---|---|---|---|---|
| 1 | Jeannie Longo (FRA) | 4 | 1 | 1 | 6 | Duitama, Lugano, San Sebastián, Lisbon |
| 2 | Ellen van Dijk (NED) | 3 | 1 | 2 | 6 | Florence, Brugge, Wollongong |
| 3 | Judith Arndt (GER) | 2 | 3 | 2 | 7 | Copenhagen, Valkenburg |
| 4 | Marlen Reusser (SUI) | 2 | 2 | 1 | 5 | Kigali, Montreal |
| 5 | Kristin Armstrong (USA) | 2 | 1 | 1 | 4 | Salzburg, Mendrisio |
| 5 | Karin Thürig (SUI) | 2 | 1 | 1 | 4 | Verona, Madrid |
| 7 | Annemiek van Vleuten (NED) | 2 | 0 | 2 | 4 | Bergen, Innsbruck |
| 8 | Chloe Dygert (USA) | 2 | 0 | 1 | 3 | Harrogate, Stirling |
| 9 | Leontien van Moorsel (NED) | 2 | 0 | 0 | 2 | Valkenburg, Verona |
| 9 | Amber Neben (USA) | 2 | 0 | 0 | 2 | Varese, Doha |
| 11 | Anna van der Breggen (NED) | 1 | 5 | 0 | 6 | Imola |
| 12 | Linda Villumsen (NZL) (DEN) | 1 | 2 | 3 | 6 | Richmond |

=== Medallists by nation ===
Nations are ranked in order of number of gold, silver and bronze medals won.

| Rank | Nation | Gold | Silver | Bronze | Total |
|---|---|---|---|---|---|
| 1 | Netherlands | 8 | 7 | 5 | 20 |
| 2 | United States | 8 | 2 | 5 | 15 |
| 3 | Switzerland | 4 | 5 | 2 | 11 |
| 4 | Germany | 4 | 3 | 5 | 12 |
| 5 | France | 4 | 2 | 1 | 7 |
| 6 | Australia | 1 | 3 | 3 | 7 |
| 7 | New Zealand | 1 | 2 | 2 | 5 |
| 7 | Russia | 1 | 2 | 2 | 5 |
| 9 | Great Britain | 1 | 1 | 1 | 3 |
| 9 | Spain | 1 | 1 | 1 | 3 |
| 11 | Canada | 0 | 2 | 0 | 2 |
| 12 | Austria | 0 | 1 | 2 | 3 |
| 13 | Italy | 0 | 1 | 1 | 2 |
| 14 | Ukraine | 0 | 1 | 0 | 1 |
| 15 | Lithuania | 0 | 0 | 2 | 2 |
| 16 | Denmark | 0 | 0 | 1 | 1 |
| Totals (16 entries) | | 33 | 33 | 33 | 99 |
