= Cycling at the 2008 Summer Olympics – Women's road time trial =

Women's road time trial at the Games of the XXIX Olympiad
- Venues: Urban Road Cycling Course
- Date: 13 August 2008
- Competitors: 25 from 17 nations
- Winning time: 34:51.72

Medalists
1st place, gold medalist(s)		Kristin Armstrong	United States
2nd place, silver medalist(s)		Emma Pooley	Great Britain
3rd place, bronze medalist(s)		Karin Thürig	Switzerland

The Women's road time trial at the 2008 Summer Olympics took place on August 13 at the Urban Road Cycling Course. Of the 25 women competing in the event, the medal hopefuls included Karin Thürig (Switzerland), Judith Arndt and Hanka Kupfernagel (Germany), Marianne Vos (Netherlands), Christiane Soeder (Austria), and road race gold medalist Nicole Cooke (Great Britain).

Cyclists started at two-minute intervals on the course, which was 23.5 km (14.6 mi) in length. They competed against the clock rather than in a direct race against the cyclists.

Kristin Armstrong of the USA won the event in under 35 minutes, finishing 24.29 seconds ahead of Emma Pooley of Great Britain. Armstrong's average speed was 40.445 km/h (25.1 mph).

== Result ==
Rank	Rider	Country	Time
Gold medal	Kristin Armstrong	United States	34:51.72
Silver medal	Emma Pooley	Great Britain	35:16.01
Bronze medal	Karin Thürig	Switzerland	35:50.99
4	Jeannie Longo-Ciprelli	France	35:52.62
5	Christine Thorburn	United States	35:54.16
6	Judith Arndt	Germany	35:59.77
7	Christiane Soeder	Austria	36:20.75
8	Priska Doppmann	Switzerland	36:27.79
9	Zulfiya Zabirova	Kazakhstan	36:29.47
10	Susanne Ljungskog	Sweden	36:33.50
11	Hanka Kupfernagel	Germany	36:35.05
12	Tatiana Guderzo	Italy	36:37.97
13	Linda Villumsen	Denmark	36:50.62
14	Marianne Vos	Netherlands	36:58.67
15	Nicole Cooke	Great Britain	37:14.25
16	Natalia Boyarskaya	Russia	37:14.65
17	Gao Min	China	37:15.23
18	Mirjam Melchers-van Poppel	Netherlands	37:51.59
19	Marta Vilajosana	Spain	37:54.99
20	Maryline Salvetat	France	38:09.72
21	Emma Johansson	Sweden	38:28.83
22	Oenone Wood	Australia	38:53.45
23	Edita Pučinskaitė	Lithuania	38:55.37
24	Alexandra Wrubleski	Canada	39:15.42
25	Meng Lang	China	40:51.61

== See also ==
- 2007 UCI Road World Championships - Women's Time Trial
