= 2006 UCI Road World Championships – Women's time trial =

Women's time trial
2006 UCI Road World Championships
- Rainbow jersey

Race details
- Dates: 20 September 2006 in Salzburg, Austria
- Stages: 1
- Distance: 26.12 km (16.23 mi)
- Winning time: 35' 04"

Medalists
	Gold	Kristin Armstrong (USA)
	Silver	Karin Thürig (SUI)
	Bronze	Christine Thorburn (USA)

The Women's time trial at the 2006 UCI Road World Championships took place over a distance of 26.12 kilometres (16.2 miles) in Salzburg, Austria on 20 September 2006.

== Final classification ==
Rank	Rider	Country	Time
1st place, gold medalist(s)	Kristin Armstrong	United States	35' 04"
2nd place, silver medalist(s)	Karin Thürig	Switzerland	+ 25"
3rd place, bronze medalist(s)	Christine Thorburn	United States	+ 29"
4	Priska Doppmann	Switzerland	+ 55"
5	Nicole Cooke	United Kingdom	+ 55"
6	Zulfiya Zabirova	Kazakhstan	+ 58"
7	Judith Arndt	Germany	+ 1' 04"
8	Lada Kozlíková	Czech Republic	+ 1' 05"
9	Trixi Worrack	Germany	+ 1' 18"
10	Amber Neben	United States	+ 1' 26"
11	Natalia Boyarskaya	Russia	+ 1' 35"
12	Tereza Huříková	Czech Republic	+ 1' 35"
13	Nicole Brändli	Switzerland	+ 1' 41"
14	Linda Villumsen	Denmark	+ 1' 47"
15	Susanne Ljungskog	Sweden	+ 1' 52"
16	Christiane Soeder	Austria	+ 1' 55"
17	Svetlana Boubnenkova	Russia	+ 2' 05"
18	Edwige Pitel	France	+ 2' 09"
19	Jeannie Longo	France	+ 2' 18"
20	Anne Samplonius	Canada	+ 2' 21"
21	Loes Gunnewijk	Netherlands	+ 2' 25"
22	Tatiana Guderzo	Italy	+ 2' 35"
23	Edita Pučinskaitė	Lithuania	+ 2' 42"
24	Li Meifang	China	+ 2' 44"
25	María Isabel Moreno	Spain	+ 2' 49"
26	An Van Rie	Belgium	+ 2' 55"
27	Oenone Wood	Australia	+ 3' 01"
28	Kathy Watt	Australia	+ 3' 15"
29	Eneritz Iturriaga Echevarria	Spain	+ 3' 20"
30	Trine Hansen	Denmark	+ 3' 21"
31	Silvia Valsecchi	Italy	+ 3' 32"
32	Paulina Brzeźna	Poland	+ 3' 57"
33	Blaža Klemenčič	Slovenia	+ 4' 04"
34	Baerbel Jungmeier	Austria	+ 4' 24"
35	Urte Juodvalkyte	Lithuania	+ 4' 31"
36	Iryna Shpylyova	Ukraine	+ 5' 05"
37	Magdalena Zamolska	Poland	+ 6' 04"
DNF	Alex Wrubleski	Canada	-
DNS	Alessandra Grassi	Mexico	-
