= Cycling at the 2004 Summer Olympics – Women's individual road race =

Cycling at the Olympics

Women's cycling road race at the Games of the XXVIII Olympiad
- Venue: Urban Road Cycling Course; 126.4 km (78.5 mi)
- Date: 15 August 2004
- Competitors: 67 from 27 nations
- Winning time: 3:24:24

Medalists
1st place, gold medalist(s)		Sara Carrigan	Australia
2nd place, silver medalist(s)		Judith Arndt	Germany
3rd place, bronze medalist(s)		Olga Slyusareva	Russia

The women's road race was one of the cycling events at the 2004 Summer Olympics in Athens, Greece. It took place on 15 August 2004, featuring 67 women from 27 countries.

== Race ==
The peloton finally split on the penultimate lap, with a small group going clear that contained a number of the favourites, and two Australian cyclists, Sara Carrigan and Oenene Wood. When Carrigan broke from this group on the final lap, only Judith Arndt was able or willing to chase her down, and the pair stayed clear until the end, Carrigan out sprinting Arndt for the line. Russian sprinter Olga Slyusareva won the chase for bronze ahead of Wood and Nicole Cooke of Britain, who had had to work hard to catch up with the chasing group after hitting a barrier on the final lap. The 2000 Olympic champion, Leontien Zijlaard-van Moorsel of the Netherlands clipped another rider and crashed out on the penultimate lap.

== Final classification ==
Start: 15:00

Final results
Rank	Name	Country	Time
1st place, gold medalist(s)	Sara Carrigan	Australia	3:24:24
2nd place, silver medalist(s)	Judith Arndt	Germany	3:24:31
3rd place, bronze medalist(s)	Olga Slyusareva	Russia	3:25:03
4	Oenone Wood	Australia	3:25:03
5	Nicole Cooke	Great Britain	3:25:03
6	Mirjam Melchers	Netherlands	3:25:06
7	Joane Somarriba	Spain	3:25:06
8	Kristin Armstrong	United States	3:25:06
9	Edita Pučinskaitė	Lithuania	3:25:10
10	Jeannie Longo-Ciprelli	France	3:25:23
11	Susan Palmer-Komar	Canada	3:25:37
12	Olivia Gollan	Australia	3:25:42
13	Noemi Cantele	Italy	3:25:42
14	Anita Valen	Norway	3:25:42
15	Christine Thorburn	United States	3:25:42
16	Deirdre Demet-Barry	United States	3:25:42
17	Joanne Kiesanowski	New Zealand	3:25:42
18	Priska Doppmann	Switzerland	3:25:42
19	Zinaida Stahurskaya	Belarus	3:25:42
20	Miho Oki	Japan	3:25:42
21	Sharon Vandromme	Belgium	3:25:42
22	Rachel Heal	Great Britain	3:25:42
23	Iryna Chuzhynova	Ukraine	3:25:42
24	Christiane Soeder	Austria	3:25:42
25	Trixi Worrack	Germany	3:25:42
26	Tatiana Guderzo	Italy	3:25:42
27	Malgorzata Wysocka	Poland	3:25:42
28	Barbara Heeb	Switzerland	3:25:42
29	Rasa Polikevičiūtė	Lithuania	3:25:42
30	Manon Jutras	Canada	3:25:42
31	Jolanta Polikevičiūtė	Lithuania	3:25:42
32	Edwige Pitel	France	3:28:39
33	Susanne Ljungskog	Sweden	3:28:39
34	Eneritz Iturriaga Mazaga	Spain	3:28:39
35	Evelyn García Marroquín	El Salvador	3:28:39
36	Nataliya Kachalka	Ukraine	3:28:39
37	Giorgia Bronzini	Italy	3:28:39
38	Nicole Brändli	Switzerland	3:28:39
39	Zulfiya Zabirova	Russia	3:28:39
40	Sonia Huguet	France	3:30:30
41	Miyoko Karami	Japan	3:30:30
42	Bogumiła Matusiak	Poland	3:31:55
43	Valentyna Karpenko	Ukraine	3:33:35
44	Qian Yunjuan	China	3:33:35
45	Volha Hayeva	Belarus	3:33:35
46	Belem Guerrero Méndez	Mexico	3:33:35
47	Zhang Junying	China	3:33:35
48	Lene Byberg	Norway	3:33:35
49	Madeleine Lindberg	Sweden	3:33:35
50	Maria Dolores Molina	Guatemala	3:40:43
51	Han Songhee	South Korea	3:40:43
52	Martina Růžičková	Czech Republic	3:40:43
53	Linn Torp	Norway	3:40:43
54	Janildes Fernandes	Brazil	3:40:43
55	Anriette Schoeman	South Africa	3:40:43
56	Michelle Hyland	New Zealand	3:40:43
—	Angela Brodtka	Germany	DNF
—	Svetlana Bubnenkova	Russia	DNF
—	Dori Ruano	Spain	DNF
—	Anouska van der Zee	Netherlands	DNF
—	Lyne Bessette	Canada	DNF
—	Leontien van Moorsel	Netherlands	DNF
—	Camilla Larsson	Sweden	DNF
—	Sara Symington	Great Britain	DNF
—	Melissa Holt	New Zealand	DNF
—	Lada Kozlíková	Czech Republic	DNF
—	Maaris Meier	Estonia	DNF
