= Amber Neben =

American racing cyclist (born 1975)

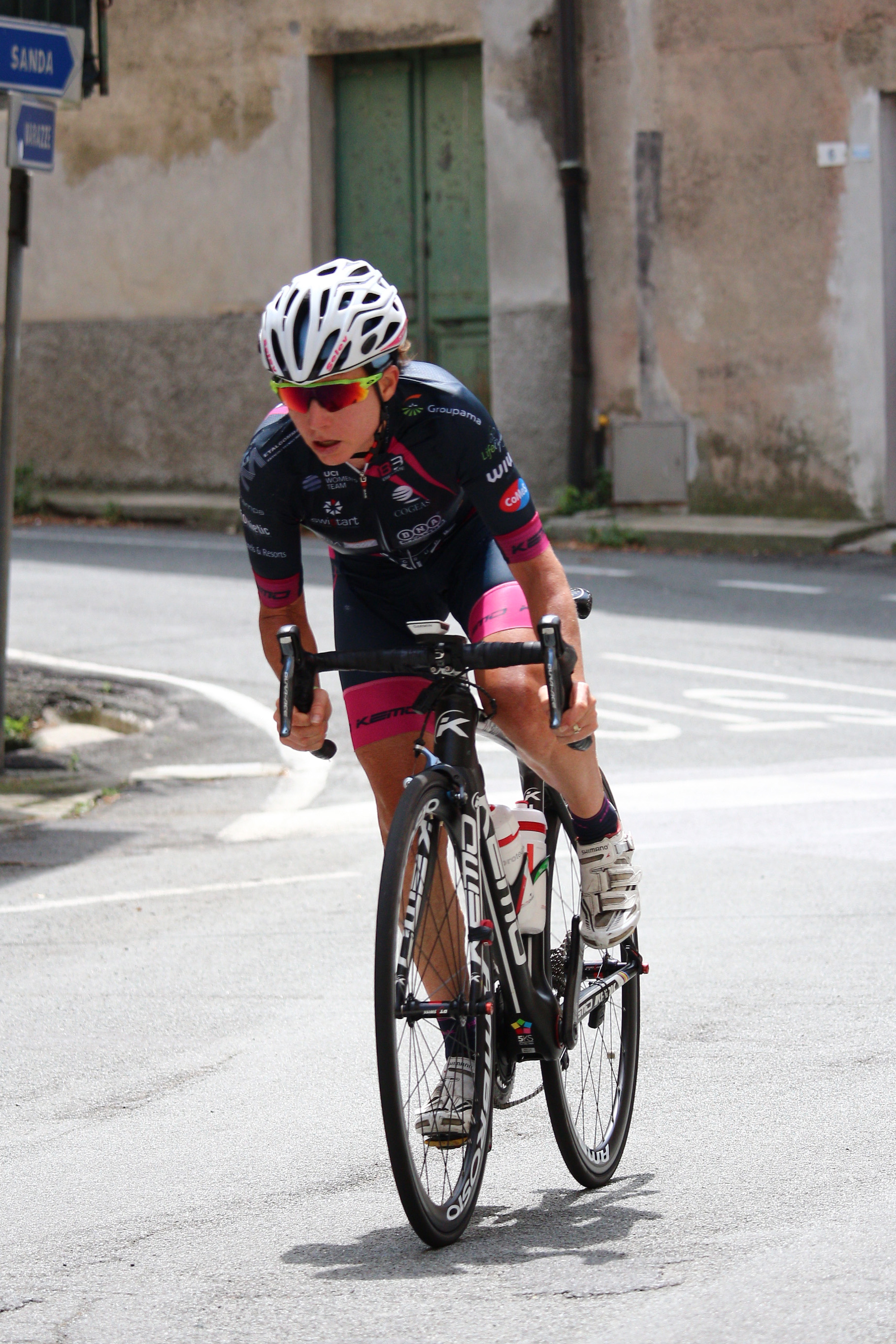
- Neben during the 2016 Giro d'Italia Femminile

Personal information
- Full name: Amber Leone Neben
- Born: February 18, 1975 (age 51) Irvine, California, United States
- Height: 1.60 m (5 ft 3 in)
- Weight: 48 kg (106 lb) (2008)

Cycling career
- Sport: Cycling
- Discipline: Road
- Role: Rider
- Rider type: All-rounder

Amateur teams
- 2001: Autotrader.com
- 2010: Webcor Builders
- 2014: FCS
- 2015: Visit Dallas Cycling

Professional teams
- 2002: Cannondale–USA
- 2003–2004: Team T-Mobile
- 2005–2008: Team Flexpoint
- 2009: Equipe Nürnberger Versicherung
- 2011–2012: HTC–Highroad Women
- 2013: Pasta Zara–Cogeas
- 2015–2016: BePink–La Classica
- 2017: Team VéloCONCEPT
- 2019–2021: Cogeas–Mettler–Look

Major wins
- Stage races Tour de l'Aude (2005, 2006) Route de France Féminine (2007) Tour Cycliste Féminin International de l'Ardèche (2008) One day races World Time Trial Championships (2008, 2016) Pan American Time Trial Championships (2006, 2012) National Road Race Championships (2003, 2017) National Time Trial Championships (2012, 2017, 2018) Chrono des Nations (2011) GP Stad Roeselare (2011)
Medal record
Representing United States
Women's Road bicycle racing
World Championships
Gold medal – first place	2008 Varese	Time trial
Gold medal – first place	2016 Doha	Time trial
Pan American Championships
Gold medal – first place	2006 São Paulo	Time trial
Gold medal – first place	2012 Mar del Plata	Time trial
Gold medal – first place	2018 San Juan	Time trial
Gold medal – first place	2023 Panama City	Time trial
Gold medal – first place	2024 São José dos Campos	Time trial
Silver medal – second place	2010 Aguascalientes	Time trial
Silver medal – second place	2019 Ixmiquilpan	Time trial
Bronze medal – third place	2011 Medellín	Time trial
Representing Team Specialized–lululemon
World Championships
Gold medal – first place	2012 Valkenburg	Team time trial

Amber Leone Neben (born February 18, 1975) is an American racing cyclist, who most recently rode for UCI Women's Continental Team Cogeas–Mettler–Look. Neben won the UCI world time trial championship in 2008 and 2016 as well as the U.S. national road race championship in 2003 and 2017.

== Career ==
=== Early life ===
At the age of four Neben survived a bout of spinal meningitis, which left her in a coma for three days. Doctors told her parents that she was unlikely to survive, and that if she did, she would probably have endured brain damage and have lost her hearing. Neben played soccer and ran cross-country in junior high and high school. She attended the University of Nebraska–Lincoln on a track and cross-country scholarship. Stress fractures stopped her running and she became an undergraduate assistant coach in distance running. She took up cycling after graduating from college with a Bachelor of Science degree in biology. She then obtained a master's degree in biology from the University of California, Irvine, having originally commenced studies for a PhD. Whilst she was at UC Irvine she scored a top 10 finish at the national collegiate cycling championships, which persuaded her to exit with her master's degree and focus on professional cycling.

=== Professional career ===
She concentrated first on mountain biking but her greatest success was on the road. She won the Rupert to Pomerelle stage of the 2001 Women's Challenge race with its long, steep climb to the finish, the fourth American to win a stage at the Women's Challenge since it became a UCI event. She then concentrated on road cycling and was picked for the road world championship team in 2001 and 2002.

Neben raced again in 2004. She missed placing first by eight seconds in the time trial selection race for the Olympic Games. In spring 2005, she won the Tour de l'Aude in France. She won again in 2006. She was picked for the 2008 U.S. Olympic team and came 33rd in the road race event in Beijing. Later in 2008 she became the World TT Champion.

Neben made the 2012 U.S. Olympic team for the Women's road race, along with Kristin Armstrong, Shelley Olds and Evelyn Stevens. In the Women's time trial she finished 7th.

== Doping suspension ==
Neben tested positive for the banned substance 19-Norandrosterone on May 31, 2003, after she won the Coupe du Monde Montreal World Cup race. The test results were not confirmed until after her "A" sample and "B" sample both returned 6.9 ng/ml, which is above the 5 ng/ml cutoff. Neben appealed to the Court of Arbitration for Sport [CAS] and accepted a provisional suspension from mid-July 2003. Neben said the positive test came from contaminated supplements. As she was a member of the T-Mobile Women's Cycling Team, a trade team owned by USA Cycling, she enlisted USA Cycling top management as witnesses in her defense. Sean Petty, VP of Marketing of USA Cycling, Gerard Bisceglia, CEO for USA Cycling, Steve Johnson, COO and director of athletics for USA Cycling, Bob Stapleton, Vice Chair for T-Mobile USA all testified on her behalf. The North American CAS ruled in October 2003 that doping had occurred but that it was not intentional. Neben was suspended, in a split decision, for six months, starting from the provisional ban beginning on July 13, 2003. The ruling also stated that all competitive results which occurred on or after May 31, 2003 were cancelled. Therefore, her win at the Coupe du Monde Montreal on May 31 was cancelled, but not her Elite Women's Road Race National Title, which occurred on May 22. She would have to be tested for drugs regularly for the following 18 months.

== Personal life ==
She is married to Jason K. Neben, associate vice president of Data and Technology, and Founding Chair of the Data Governance Committee at Concordia University Irvine.

In 2007, she underwent a successful program of treatment for melanoma.

== Major results ==
2001
1st Time trial, California State Road Championships
1st Overall Cascade Cycling Classic

1st Stages 1, 2 & 3

1st Stage 1 GP Féminin International du Canada
2nd Road race, National Road Championships
5th Overall Women's Challenge

1st Stage 1

10th Overall Redlands Bicycle Classic
2002
1st Overall Gracia–Orlová

1st Mountains classification
1st Stage 3

National Road Championships

2nd Road race
2nd Time trial

2nd Housatonic Valley Classic
6th Overall Women's Challenge
9th Overall Grande Boucle Féminine Internationale
10th Coupe du Monde Cycliste Féminine de Montréal
2003
National Road Championships

1st Road race
3rd Time trial

~~1st Overall Tour du Grand Montréal~~
4th Overall Redlands Bicycle Classic
4th Overall Sea Otter Classic
4th Overall Gracia–Orlová

1st Stage 2 (ITT)

7th La Flèche Wallonne Féminine
7th Tour de Berne
2004
1st Overall Tour of the Gila

1st Stages 1 & 2

2nd Time trial, National Road Championships
5th Coupe du Monde Cycliste Féminine de Montréal
7th Overall Giro della Toscana

1st Stage 2

9th Overall Tour du Grand Montréal
2005
1st Overall Tour de l'Aude

1st Stage 3

2nd Time trial, National Road Championships
4th Overall Giro d'Italia Femminile
5th UCI Road World Championships – Women's time trial
9th La Flèche Wallonne Féminine
2006
1st Time trial, Pan American Road Championships
1st Overall Tour de l'Aude Cycliste Féminin
1st Overall Redlands Bicycle Classic

1st Stages 1 (ITT) & 2

National Road Championships

2nd Time trial
3rd Road race

2nd Overall Thüringen Rundfahrt der Frauen
2nd Overall Gracia–Orlová
2nd La Route de France
2nd L'Heure D'Or Feminin
5th La Flèche Wallonne Féminine
10th UCI Road World Championships – Women's time trial
2007
1st Overall Redlands Bicycle Classic

1st Stage 2 (ITT)

1st Overall La Route de France

1st Stage 1 (ITT)

National Road Championships

2nd Time trial
3rd Road race

2nd Overall Thüringen Rundfahrt der Frauen
2nd Chrono Champenois – Trophée Européen
3rd Overall Giro di San Marino
4th UCI Road World Championships – Women's time trial
4th La Flèche Wallonne Féminine
5th Overall Tour de l'Aude Cycliste Féminin
9th Coupe du Monde Cycliste Féminine de Montréal
2008
1st UCI Road World Championships – Women's time trial
1st Overall Tour Cycliste Féminin International de l'Ardèche
2nd Overall Giro d'Italia Femminile
3rd Grand Prix de Suisse
3rd Chrono Champenois – Trophée Européen
5th Overall Iurreta-Emakumeen Bira
5th La Flèche Wallonne Féminine
5th Memorial Davide Fardelli
5th Chrono des Nations
8th Overall Tour de l'Aude Cycliste Féminin
2009
1st Stage 2 (ITT) Giro d'Italia Femminile
2nd Overall Redlands Bicycle Classic
2nd Memorial Davide Fardelli
4th Overall Gracia–Orlová

1st Stage 3 (ITT)

4th La Flèche Wallonne Féminine
5th Overall Tour Cycliste Féminin International de l'Ardèche
6th UCI Road World Championships – Women's time trial
6th Overall Tour de l'Aude Cycliste Féminin

1st Stage 2 (TTT)

9th Liberty Classic
10th Coupe du Monde Cycliste Féminine de Montréal
2010
1st Memorial Davide Fardelli
2nd Time trial, National Road Championships
2nd Overall Women's Tour of New Zealand

1st Stage 4 (ITT)

2nd Chrono des Nations
4th UCI Road World Championships – Women's time trial
4th Overall Redlands Bicycle Classic

1st Prologue

6th Chrono Champenois
7th Chrono Gatineau
2011
1st GP Stad Roeselare
1st Chrono des Nations
1st Open de Suède Vårgårda TTT
2nd Time trial, National Road Championships
2nd Overall Thüringen Rundfahrt der Frauen
2nd Chrono Champenois
3rd Time trial, Pan American Road Championships
3rd Chrono Gatineau
3rd Memorial Davide Fardelli
8th UCI Road World Championships – Women's time trial
2012
1st Team time trial (with Ellen van Dijk, Charlotte Becker, Evelyn Stevens, Ina-Yoko Teutenberg and Trixi Worrack)
1st Time trial, Pan American Road Championships
1st Time trial, National Road Championships
1st Open de Suède Vårgårda TTT
1st Chrono des Nations
1st Stage 2 (TTT) Holland Ladies Tour
3rd Grand Prix el Salvador
3rd Chrono Gatineau
4th Road race
4th Overall Vuelta a El Salvador

1st Points classification
1st Mountains classification
1st Stages 2 & 3b (ITT)

6th Overall Grand Prix Elsy Jacobs
7th UCI Road World Championships – Women's time trial
7th Time trial, Summer Olympics
2013
6th Grand Prix de Oriente
6th Chrono des Nations
8th La Flèche Wallonne Féminine
2014
2nd Overall Cascade Cycling Classic
2015
1st Overall San Dimas Stage Race

1st Stage 1 (ITT)

2nd Overall La Route de France
2nd Overall Redlands Bicycle Classic
2nd Winston-Salem Cycling Classic
3rd Time trial, National Road Championships
3rd Overall Joe Martin Stage Race
3rd Overall Cascade Cycling Classic
3rd Giro dell'Emilia Internazionale Donne Elite
4th Tour of California Women's Time Trial
4th Chrono Champenois
4th Chrono des Nations
7th Chrono Gatineau
2016
1st UCI Road World Championships – Women's time trial
1st Overall La Route de France

1st Stages 4 (ITT) & 5

1st Chrono Gatineau
2nd Time trial, National Road Championships
4th Chrono Champenois
2017
National Road Championships

1st Road race
1st Time trial

3rd Chrono Gatineau
2018
1st Time trial, Pan American Road Championships
1st Time trial, National Road Championships
1st Chrono Gatineau
1st Chrono Kristin Armstrong
7th UCI Road World Championships – Women's time trial
2019
1st Time trial, National Road Championships
1st Chrono Gatineau
2nd Time trial, Pan American Road Championships
4th UCI Road World Championships – Women's time trial
2020
6th UCI Road World Championships – Women's time trial
2021
2nd Time trial, National Road Championships
4th UCI Road World Championships – Women's time trial
5th Time trial, Summer Olympics
2022
2nd Time trial, National Road Championships
3rd Chrono des Nations
2023
1st Time trial, Pan American Road Championships
2nd Chrono Féminin de la Gatineau
3rd Time trial, National Road Championships
5th Chrono des Nations
8th UCI Road World Championships – Women's time trial
2024
1st Time trial, Pan American Road Championships
3rd Time trial, National Road Championships
10th UCI Road World Championships – Women's time trial

=== Major championship results ===
Event		2001	2002	2003	2004	2005	2006	2007	2008	2009	2010	2011	2012	2013	2014	2015	2016	2017	2018	2019	2020	2021	2022	2023	2024
Olympic Games	Time trial	Not held			—	Not held			—	Not held			7	Not held			—	Not held			5	Not held			—
Olympic Games	Road race	Not held			—	Not held			33	Not held			36	Not held			—	Not held			—	Not held			—
World Championships	Time trial	—	15	—	—	5	10	4	1	6	4	8	7	—	—	—	1	11	7	4	6	4	—	8	10
World Championships	Road race	30	DNF	—	46	33	12	16	22	DNF	17	73	4	—	—	—	98	73	—	—	69	—	—	—	—
World Championships	Team time trial	Did not exist											1	—	—	—	4	5	—	Not held					
National Championships	Time Trial	—	2	3	2	2	2	2	—	—	2	2	1	—	11	3	2	1	1	1	—	2	2	3	3
National Championships	Road Race	2	2	1	—	5	3	3	14	—	—	9	7	—	—	4	21	1	9	14	—	7	—	13	—

== See also ==
- List of doping cases in cycling
