= Sharon Vandromme =

Belgian cyclist

Personal information
- Born: 2 October 1983 (age 43) Belgium

Cycling career
- Sport: Cycling
- Discipline: Road cycling

Professional team
- 2003–2007: Vlaanderen-Capri Sonne-T-Interim

Sharon Vandromme (born 2 October 1983) is a road cyclist from Belgium. She represented her nation at the 2004 Summer Olympics in the Women's road race. She also competed at the 2003, 2004 and 2006 UCI Road World Championships.
