= Women's Tour of New Zealand =

New Zealand multi-day road cycling race

The Women's Tour of New Zealand is a stage race for elite women road cyclists held in New Zealand at the end of February or the beginning of March. It is rated as 2.2 on the UCI classification scheme. It was not held in 2013 or 2014, but returned in February 2015.

== Roll of honour ==
Year	Winner	Second	Third
2005	Catherine Sell (NZL)	Katie Brown (AUS)	Miho Oki (JPN)
2006	Sarah Ulmer (NZL)	Priska Doppmann (CHE)	Trixi Worrack (DEU)
2007	Judith Arndt (DEU)	Leigh Hobson (CAN)	Lorian Graham (AUS)
2008	Kristin Armstrong (USA)	Oenone Wood (AUS)	Erinne Willock (CAN)
2009	Amber Halliday (AUS)	Gao Min (CHN)	Lang Meng (CHN)
2010	Shelley Evans (USA)	Amber Neben (USA)	Tiffany Cromwell (AUS)
2011	Judith Arndt (DEU)	Catherine Cheatley (NZL)	Ruth Corset (AUS)
2012	Evelyn Stevens (USA)	Shara Gillow (AUS)	Taryn Heather (AUS)
2013	race not held		
2014	race not held		
2015	Tayler Wiles (USA)	Megan Guarnier (USA)	Evelyn Stevens (USA)
