= Linn Torp =

Norwegian cyclist

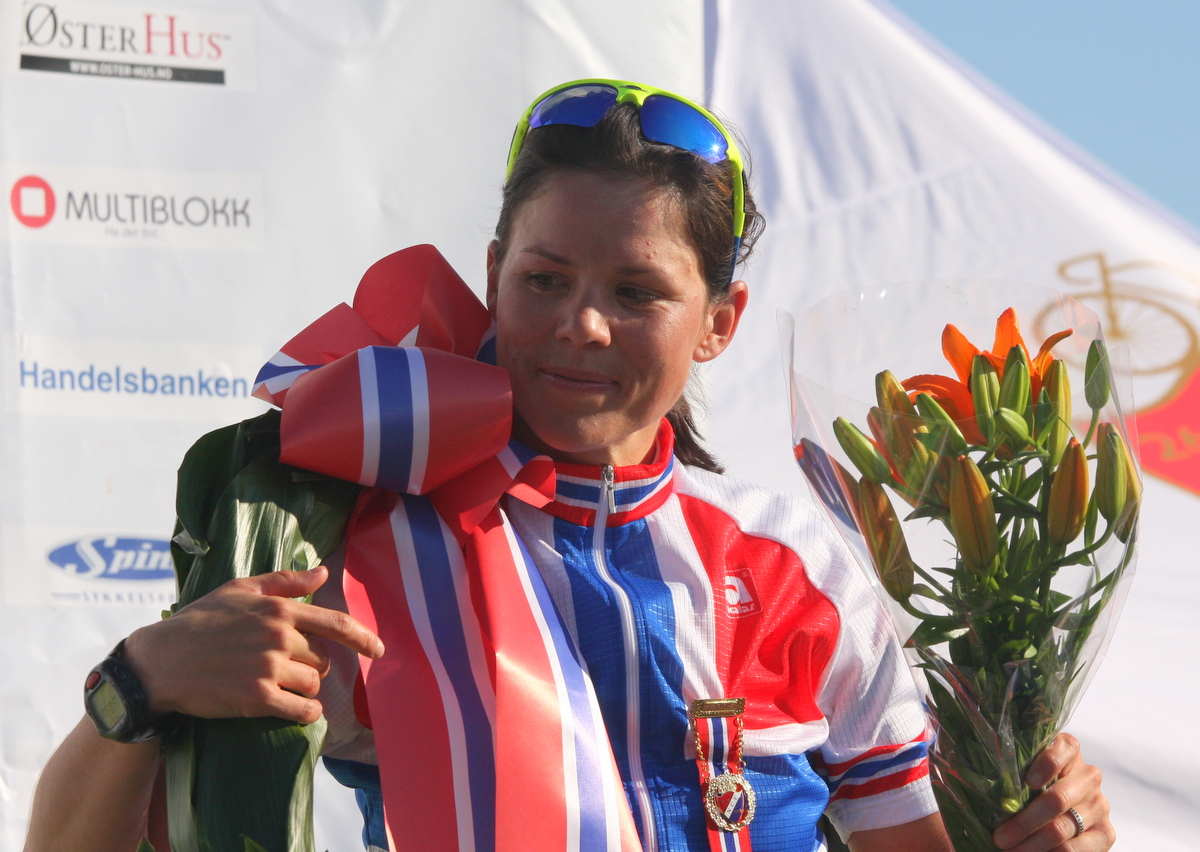
- Torp in 2009

Personal information
- Nationality: Norwegian
- Born: 22 April 1977 (age 48)

Sport
- Sport: Cycling

Linn Torp (born 22 April 1977) is a Norwegian cyclist. She was born in Eidsvoll. She won the Norwegian National Road Race Championship in 2006 and 2009.

She competed at the 2004 Summer Olympics in Athens, and at the 2006 UCI Road World Championships.

== See also ==
- 2009 Lotto-Belisol Ladiesteam season
