= 1996 UCI Road World Championships – Women's time trial =

Women's time trial
1996 UCI Road World Championships
- Rainbow jersey

Race details
- Dates: 9 October 1996 in Lugano (SUI)
- Stages: 1
- Distance: 26.4 km (16.4 mi)
- Winning time: 35' 16"

Medalists
	Gold	Jeannie Longo (FRA)
	Silver	Catherine Marsal (FRA)
	Bronze	Alessandra Cappellotto (ITA)

The Women's time trial at the 1996 UCI Road World Championships took place in Lugano, Switzerland on 9 October 1996. 33 riders participated in the race.

== Final classification ==
Rank	Rider	Country	Time
1st place, gold medalist(s)	Jeannie Longo	France	35' 16"
2nd place, silver medalist(s)	Catherine Marsal	France	+ 49"
3rd place, bronze medalist(s)	Alessandra Cappellotto	Italy	+ 54"
4	Zulfiya Zabirova	Russia	+ 1' 15"
5	Clara Hughes	Canada	+ 1' 25"
6	Marion Clignet	France	+ 1' 29"
7	Linda Jackson	Canada	+ 1' 47"
8	Gabriella Pregnolato	Italy	+ 1' 48"
9	Hanka Kupfernagel	Germany	+ 1' 53"
10	Barbara Heeb	Switzerland	+ 2' 03"
11	Mari Holden	United States	+ 2' 20"
12	Tea Vikstedt	Finland	+ 2' 27"
13	Natalia Boubenchtchikova	Russia	+ 2' 28"
14	Rasa Polikevičiūtė	Lithuania	+ 2' 43"
15	Lenka Ilavská	Slovakia	+ 2' 44"
16	Yvonne McGregor	United Kingdom	+ 2' 45"
17	Diana Rast	Switzerland	+ 2' 47"
18	Jolanta Polikevičiūtė	Lithuania	+ 2' 57"
19	Karen Kurreck	United States	+ 3' 05"
20	Joane Somarriba	Spain	+ 3' 07"
21	Tamara Polyakova	Ukraine	+ 3' 20"
22	Jenny Algelid-Bengtsson	Sweden	+ 3' 30"
23	Ingunn Bollerud	Norway	+ 3' 37"
24	Izasqun Bengoa	Spain	+ 3' 41"
25	Zinaida Stahurskaya	Belarus	+ 3' 50"
26	Vera Hohlfeld	Germany	+ 4' 15"
27	Anke Erlank	South Africa	+ 4' 33"
28	Miluse Flaskova Glave	Czech Republic	+ 4' 36"
29	Valentina Karpenko	Ukraine	+ 5' 03"
30	Meike de Bruijn	Netherlands	+ 5' 18"
31	Jenny Derham	United Kingdom	+ 5' 53"
32	Willeke van der Weide	Netherlands	+ 6' 07"
33	Elena Malinovskaia	Belarus	+ 6' 34"
