= Christine Thorburn =

American cyclist

Personal information
- Full name: Christine Thorburn
- Born: 17 September 1969 (age 57) Davenport, Iowa, United States
- Height: 1.63 m (5 ft 4 in)
- Weight: 56 kg (123 lb)

Cycling career
- Sport: Cycling
- Current team: Retired
- Discipline: Road
- Role: Rider, time-trialist

Amateur team
- 2002–2008: Webcor Builders Cycling Team

Professional team
- 2008: Webcor Builders Cycling Team

Major wins
- U.S. Championships (ITT) (2004); Cascade Cycling Classic (2004); Redlands Bicycle Classic (2005); Central Valley Classic (2007)
Medal record
Women's road cycling
Representing the United States
World Championships
Bronze medal – third place	2006 Salzburg	Time trial
Pan American Championships
Silver medal – second place	2005 Mar del Plata	Time trial

Christine Thorburn (born September 17, 1969, in Davenport, Iowa) is a retired American professional road cyclist. She became the U.S. women's individual time trial champion in 2004, and later represented the United States in two editions of the Olympic Games (2004 and 2008), where she narrowly missed the podium twice in the same event. Before retiring to pursue her medicine and rheumatology career in 2008, Thorburn rode for the Webcor Builders Cycling Team in the women's elite professional events on the UCI Women's World Cup and on the UCI World Championships, where she took home the bronze medal in 2006.

== Racing career ==
Before her professional cycling career, Thorburn had been a cross-country runner at Grinnell College in her native state Iowa, where she earned a Bachelor of Arts degree in chemistry. Thorburn discovered competitive cycling when she enrolled as a graduate student at Stanford University School of Medicine. An old knee injury that sidelined her running career turned her sights to cycling, and eventually, she was encouraged by some of her friends to join the university's club team. In 1998, she helped Stanford mount a second-place finish at the USA Cycling Collegiate Road National Championships.

After receiving her medical degree from Stanford in 1999, Thorburn took a break from competitive cycling to undergo a professional residency in internal medicine. Upon returning to a relatively leisure schedule from her limited medicine studies, Thorburn started riding for the Webcor Builders Women's Amateur Cycling Team in 2002. She established an early breakthrough by joining the U.S. team at the UCI World Championships and by scoring her first ever triumph at the U.S. Championships in 2004, which handed her an Olympic selection.

An official member of the USA Cycling team, Thorburn made her worldwide debut at the 2004 Summer Olympics in Athens, where she finished fifteenth in the women's road race (3:25:42), and fourth in the women's time trial (32:14.82), narrowly missing out the Olympic podium by twenty seconds.

At the 2006 UCI World Championships in Salzburg, Austria, Thorburn joined her teammate Kristin Armstrong to stand on the podium for the first time in the event's history, as she delivered the Americans a bronze-medal time in 35:34.25.

Two years later, Thorburn qualified for her second U.S. squad, as a 38-year-old, in women's road cycling events at the 2008 Summer Olympics in Beijing by receiving one of the nation's three available berths from the UCI World Cup and by being finally chosen to the USA Cycling team. In the women's road race, held on the second day of the Games, she successfully completed a grueling race with a fifty-second-place effort in 3:41:08, surpassing New Zealand's Catherine Cheatley by a few inches. Three days later, in the women's time trial, Thorburn missed another chance to claim an Olympic medal by three seconds after finishing with a fifth-place time in 35:54.16.

Shortly after her second Olympics, Thorburn announced her official retirement from competitive cycling to focus on her full-time medical career as a rheumatologist at the Palo Alto Medical Clinic. She also currently resides in Menlo Park, California with her husband Ted Huang, a prominent Mistral windsurfer and a former two-time Olympian (1996 and 2000) from Chinese Taipei.

== Major results ==
2004
1st U.S. Championships (ITT), United States
1st Overall, Cascade Cycling Classic, United States
1st Stage 3, Tour of the Gila, United States
2nd U.S. Championships (Road), United States
3rd Overall, Redlands Bicycle Classic, United States

2nd Stage 2
3rd Stage 1

3rd Overall, Sea Otter Classic, United States

3rd Stage 1, Laguna Seca Raceway
3rd Stage 2, Salinas Valley, California

3rd Stage 1, Tour of the Gila, Tyrone, New Mexico (USA)
3rd Stage 2, Tour of the Gila, Mogollon, New Mexico (USA)
4th Olympic Games (ITT), Athens (GRE)
7th UCI Road World Championships – Women's time trial
15th Olympic Games (Road), Athens (GRE)
2005
1st Overall, Redlands Bicycle Classic, United States

1st Prologue, Mount Rubidoux, California
1st Stage 1, Oak Glen, California

1st Stage 1a, Tour du Grand Montréal, Lachine, Quebec (CAN)
2nd Pan American Championships (Road), Mar del Plata (ARG)
2nd Overall, Tour de Toona, United States

1st Stage 3, Altoona, Pennsylvania

3rd U.S. Championships (ITT), United States
3rd Overall, Sea Otter Classic, United States

3rd Stage 1
3rd Stage 2

8th UCI Road World Championships – Women's time trial
2006
1st Stage 1, Central Valley Classic, United States
1st Stage 1, Tour du Grand Montréal, Lachine, Quebec (CAN)
2nd U.S. Championships (Road), United States
2nd Overall, Redlands Bicycle Classic, United States

2nd Stage 3
3rd Stage 1

3rd UCI Road World Championships – Women's time trial
3rd U.S. Championships (ITT), United States
3rd Overall, Nature Valley Grand Prix, United States

2nd Stage 1, Saint Paul, Minnesota

2007
1st Overall, Central Valley Classic, United States

1st Stage 2

2nd Prologue, Redlands Bicycle Classic, United States
3rd U.S. Championships (ITT), United States
3rd Stage 1, Redlands Bicycle Classic, United States
5th UCI Road World Championships – Women's time trial
2008
2nd Overall, Cascade Cycling Classic, United States

2nd Stage 3
3rd Stage 1

5th Olympic Games (ITT), Beijing (CHN)
12th UCI World Championships (ITT), Varese (ITA)
52nd Olympic Games (Road), Beijing (CHN)
