= Cycling at the 2012 Summer Olympics – Women's road time trial =

Women's road time trial at the Games of the XXX Olympiad
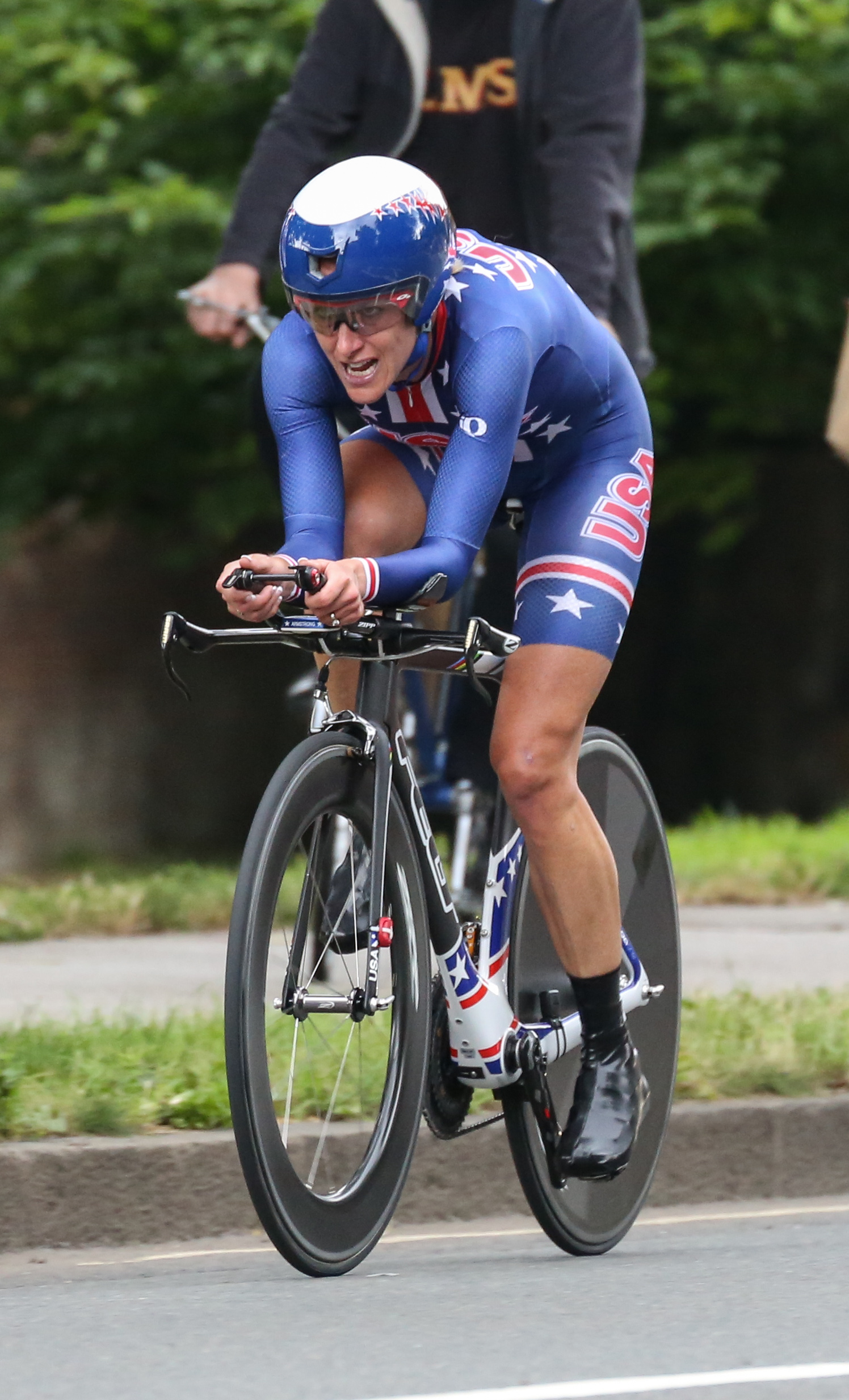
- American Kristin Armstrong leading the women's road time trial
- Venue: London and Surrey
- Date: 1 August
- Competitors: 24 from 16 nations
- Winning time: 37:34.82

Medalists
1st place, gold medalist(s)		Kristin Armstrong	United States
2nd place, silver medalist(s)		Judith Arndt	Germany
3rd place, bronze medalist(s)		Olga Zabelinskaya	Russia

The women's road time trial, one of the cycling events at the 2012 Olympic Games in London, took place on 1 August in southwest London and Surrey. Kristin Armstrong of the United States was the defending champion. The competition consisted of a time trial over one lap of a 29 km (18.0 mi) course, with staggered starts.

Armstrong retained the title and won the gold medal with a winning time of 37 minutes 34.82 seconds. Judith Arndt from Germany was second and won silver, while Olga Zabelinskaya of Russia collected bronze.

== Schedule ==
All times are British Summer Time

Date	Time	Round
Wednesday 1 August 2012	12:30	Final

== Course ==
The competition consisted of a time trial over one lap of a 29 km (18.0 mi) course, with staggered starts. Starting and finishing at the historic Hampton Court Palace, the course passed through areas of southwest London and Surrey including Esher and Kingston upon Thames.

== Results ==
The provisional entry list was published on 23 July, and the confirmed start list of 24 riders on 31 July.

Rank	Rider	Country	Time
1st place, gold medalist(s)	Kristin Armstrong	United States	37:34.82
2nd place, silver medalist(s)	Judith Arndt	Germany	37:50.29
3rd place, bronze medalist(s)	Olga Zabelinskaya	Russia	37:57.35
4	Linda Villumsen	New Zealand	37:59.18
5	Clara Hughes	Canada	38:28.96
6	Emma Pooley	Great Britain	38:37.70
7	Amber Neben	United States	38:45.17
8	Ellen van Dijk	Netherlands	38:53.68
9	Trixi Worrack	Germany	39:20.73
10	Lizzie Armitstead	Great Britain	39:26.24
11	Pia Sundstedt	Finland	40:01.69
12	Tatiana Antoshina	Russia	40:12.49
13	Shara Gillow	Australia	40:25.03
14	Emma Johansson	Sweden	40:38.56
15	Audrey Cordon	France	40:40.51
16	Marianne Vos	Netherlands	40:40.79
17	Emilia Fahlin	Sweden	41:15.86
18	Clemilda Fernandes	Brazil	41:25.39
19	Denise Ramsden	Canada	41:44.81
20	Elena Tchalykh	Azerbaijan	41:47.06
21	Tatiana Guderzo	Italy	41:48.94
22	Noemi Cantele	Italy	41:51.18
23	Liesbet De Vocht	Belgium	42:08.28
24	Ashleigh Moolman	South Africa	42:23.57
