= Kristin Armstrong =

American cyclist (born 1973)

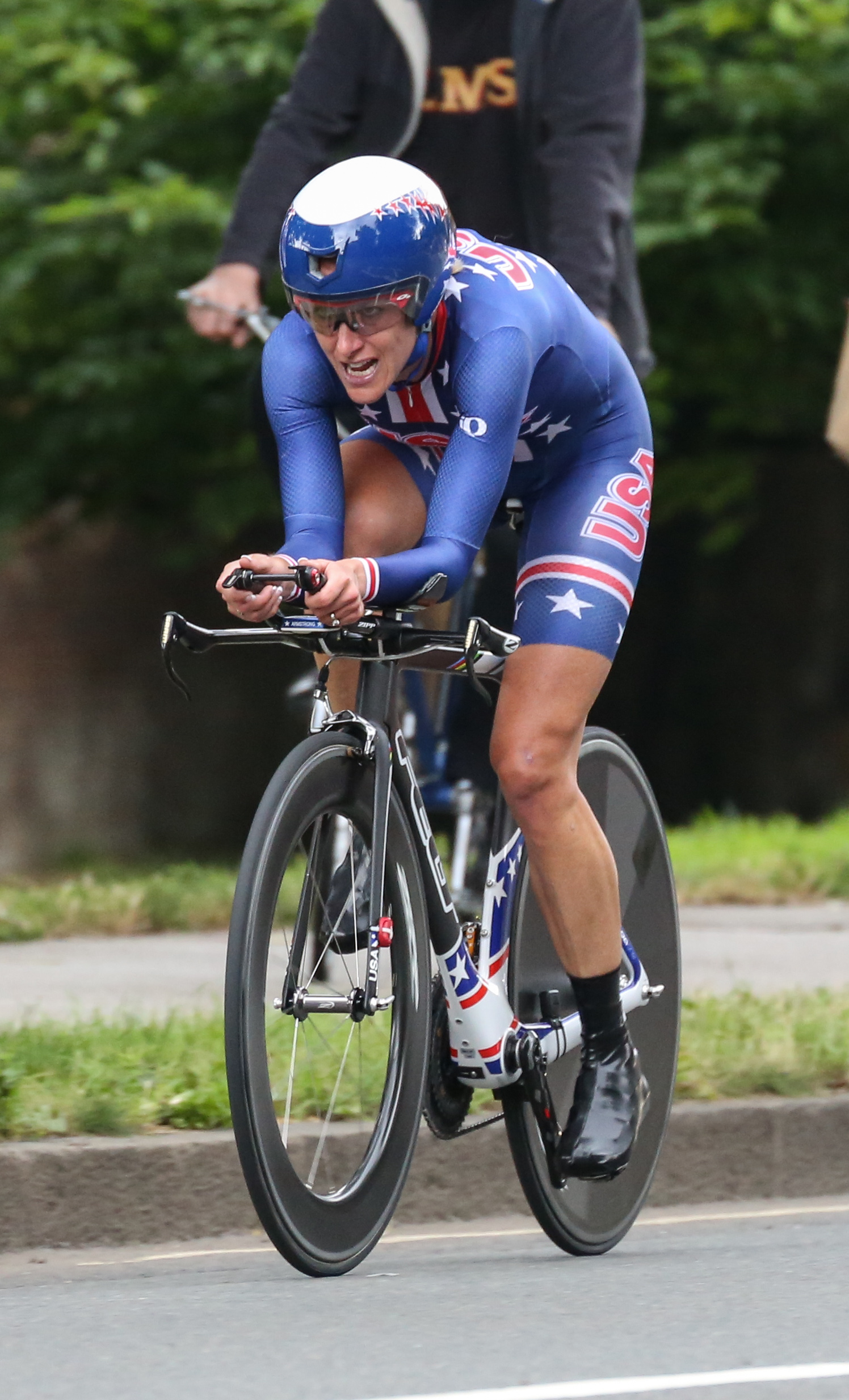
- Winning the 2012 Olympics time trial (age 38).

Personal information
- Full name: Kristin Armstrong Savola
- Born: Kristin Armstrong; August 11, 1973 (age 53) Memphis, Tennessee, U.S.
- Height: 5 ft 8 in (1.73 m)
- Weight: 128 lb (58 kg)

Cycling career
- Sport: Cycling
- Current team: Retired
- Discipline: Road
- Role: Ride
- Rider type: All-rounder

Amateur team
- 2011: Twenty12

Professional teams
- 2001–2005: T-Mobile Women
- 2006–2007: Team Lipton
- 2008–2009: Cervélo–Lifeforce Pro Cycling Team
- 2012: Exergy Twenty12
- 2015–2016: Twenty16 p/b Sho-Air

Major wins
- One-day races Olympic Time Trial Champion (2008, 2012, 2016) World Time Trial Champion (2006, 2009) Pan American Time Trial Champion (2005) National Road Race Champion (2004) National Time Trial Champion (2005–2007, 2015) Nature Valley Grand Prix (2006–2008) USA Pro Challenge (2015)
Medal record
Representing the United States
Women's road cycling
Olympic Games
Gold medal – first place	2008 Beijing	Time trial
Gold medal – first place	2012 London	Time trial
Gold medal – first place	2016 Rio de Janeiro	Time trial
World Championships
Gold medal – first place	2006 Salzburg	Time trial
Gold medal – first place	2009 Mendrisio	Time trial
Silver medal – second place	2007 Stuttgart	Time trial
Bronze medal – third place	2005 Madrid	Time trial
Pan American Games
Bronze medal – third place	2003 Santo Domingo	Time trial
Pan American Championships
Gold medal – first place	2005 Mar del Plata	Time trial

Kristin Armstrong Savola (née Armstrong; born August 11, 1973) is a former professional road bicycle racer and three-time Olympic gold medalist, the winner of the women's individual time trial in 2008, 2012, and 2016. Before temporarily retiring to start a family in 2009, she rode for Cervélo TestTeam in women's elite professional events on the National Racing Calendar (NRC) and UCI Women's World Cup. She announced a return to competitive cycling beginning in the 2011 season, competing for Peanut Butter & Co. TWENTY12 at the Redlands Classic.

== Background ==
Prior to her professional cycling career, Armstrong had been a junior Olympian in swimming, a distance runner in college, and then a triathlete. She spent many hours perfecting her strokes in the pool at the Boise Family YMCA, where she also served as Director of Aquatics, managing more than 50 lifeguards, swim instructors, and others. She was diagnosed with osteoarthritis in both hips in 2001 at age 27, and told that she could no longer run at an elite level, thus ending her triathlon career and leading her to focus exclusively on cycling.

The three-time national champion finished 8th (top U.S. finisher) in the women's road race at the 2004 Summer Olympics in Athens.

At the 2008 Summer Olympics in Beijing, Armstrong completed the biggest achievement of her career by winning the gold medal in the women's road time trial competition on August 13. Finishing in under 35 minutes, Armstrong was 25 seconds ahead of silver medalist Emma Pooley from Great Britain, with Karin Thürig from Switzerland taking the bronze.

Of Armstrong, Velonews wrote: "Kristin Armstrong is famous for both her success in bicycle racing, and the 'type-A' attention to detail that keeps her climbing the podium at critical races every season."

Armstrong announced at the end of 2010 that she would return to competitive cycling, with the goal of competing at the London 2012 Summer Olympics. In a written statement, she stated that her retirement was merely temporary in order to start a family:

I love cycling and I love competing. I stopped racing after the 2009 World Championships not because I was burned out, but because my husband and I wanted to start a family...I told myself from the beginning if everything went smoothly with the birth of our son, Lucas William, I would consider racing again.

In 2011, Armstrong returned to compete with the Peanut Butter & Co. Team TWENTY12, of which she was a part owner. She won three of the four stages (criterium, road race, and time trial) and the overall title during the Sea Otter Classic in April. However, during the first stage of the Tour of the Gila, which she had won twice previously, Armstrong came down with food poisoning. She ended up withdrawing from the race and returning home to recover.

Armstrong successfully defended her Olympic title in the individual time trial at the 2012 Olympics in London and became the oldest rider to win an Olympic time trial, and finished 35th in the Women's road race. She announced her retirement after the 2012 Olympics.

In September 2012, Armstrong's Olympic gold medal-winning time trial bike was stolen while in transit between Germany and the USA.

In April 2015, Armstrong announced that she would be coming out of retirement to race at the 2015 Pan American Road Championships in Leon, Mexico, having been selected by USA Cycling for the individual time trial. Two days after announcing Armstrong's selection, however, the USA Cycling Selection Committee reconvened, deciding that the new selection process under which Armstrong had been chosen had not been published in a timely manner, and that as a result the federation's older Principles of Athlete Selection, which had been issued in 2008, should be used instead for selection to the Pan American Championships. The upshot was that Armstrong's place was taken by Tayler Wiles. The following month, Armstrong won the United States National Time Trial Championships in Chattanooga, Tennessee, beating Carmen Small by 13 seconds.

In August 2016, Armstrong made history at the 2016 Summer Olympics in Rio de Janeiro after coming out of retirement to win the gold medal in the women's individual time trial and becoming the first rider ever to win three gold medals in the same discipline. She also became the oldest female cyclist to win an Olympic medal.

In September 2017 Armstrong joined USA Cycling as Endurance Performance Director.

In December 2019 Armstrong created and launched her bike computer mount line of products called KX3 Sports.

== Personal life ==
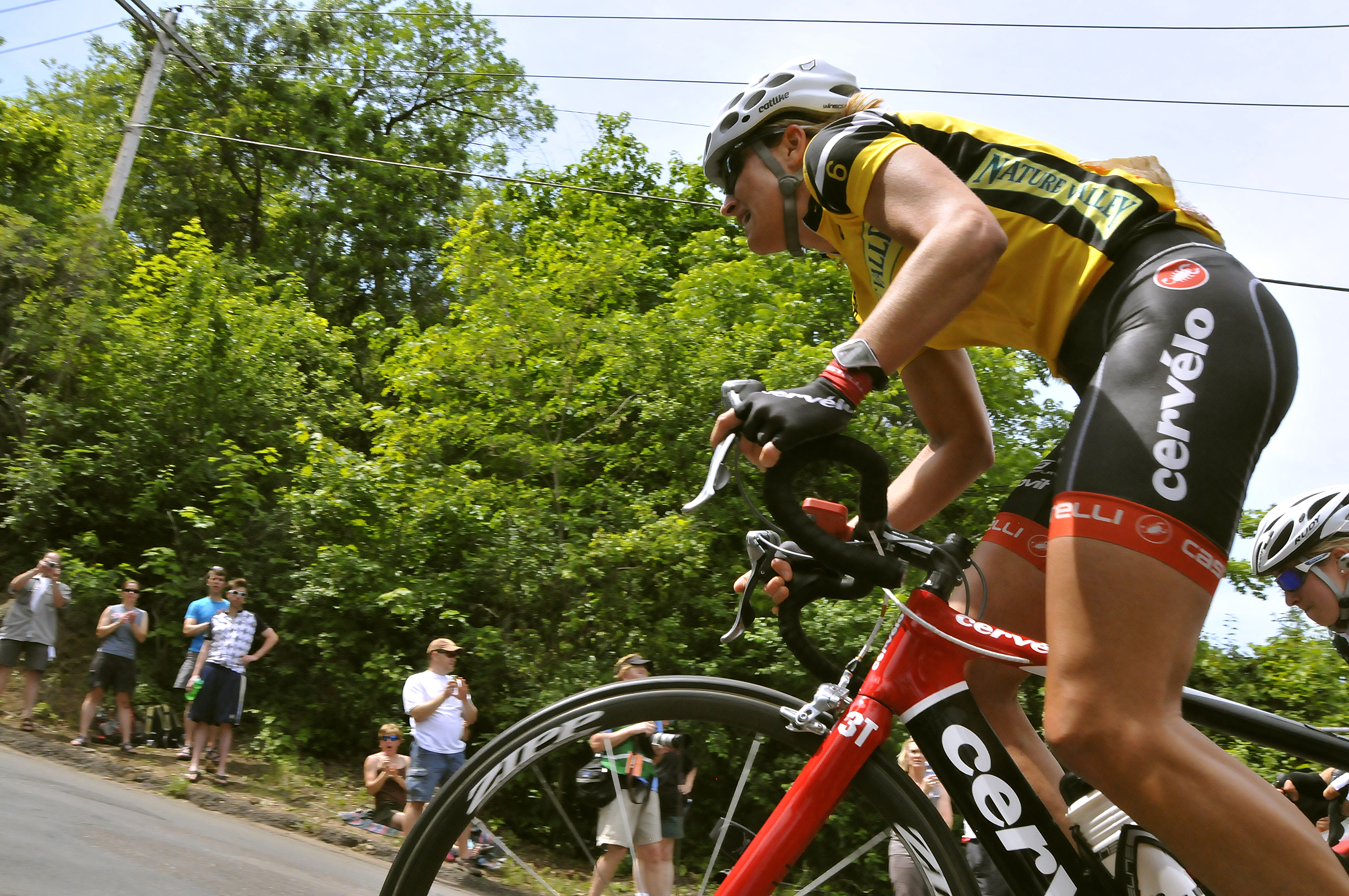
Armstrong in June 2009 (age 35).

Armstrong's father was an officer in the US Marines. Born in Memphis, Tennessee, she lived in Tennessee and California and attended high school in Havelock, North Carolina, and abroad in Okinawa, Japan, where she graduated from Kubasaki High School in 1991. She enrolled at the University of Idaho in Moscow, where she ran track for the Vandals for a season as a walk-on and was a member of the Kappa Kappa Gamma sorority. Armstrong earned a bachelor's degree from U of I in sports physiology in 1995, and currently lives in Boise, Idaho.

She is often confused with the ex-wife of fellow cyclist Lance Armstrong, whose name is also Kristin. Kristin Armstrong the cyclist and Lance Armstrong are not related.

Armstrong is married to Joe Savola; their son Lucas William Savola was born on September 15, 2010. Four months before his birth, she gave the commencement address at her alma mater in May 2010.

== Major results ==
2003
2nd Road race, National Road Championships
3rd Time trial, Pan American Games
5th Australia World Cup
10th Overall Sea Otter Classic
2004
1st Road race, National Road Championships
2nd Overall Sea Otter Classic

1st Prologue

4th Overall Tour de l'Aude Cycliste Féminin
5th Overall Redlands Bicycle Classic

1st Stage 3

8th Road race, Summer Olympics
2005
1st Time trial, Pan American Road Championships
1st Time trial, National Road Championships
1st Overall Sea Otter Classic

1st Prologue & Stage 2

1st Overall Valley of the Sun Stage Race

1st Stage 1

1st Stage 1 International Tour de Toona
2nd Individual pursuit, Pan American Track Championships
2nd Overall San Dimas Stage Race

1st Stage 1

2nd Overall Tour Cycliste Féminin International de l'Ardèche
3rd UCI Road World Championships – Women's time trial
3rd Individual pursuit, National Track Championships
3rd Overall Tour de l'Aude Cycliste Féminin
5th Overall Redlands Bicycle Classic
2006
1st UCI Road World Championships – Women's time trial
National Road Championships

1st Road race
1st Time trial

1st Overall North Star Grand Prix

1st Stages 1 (ITT) & 4

1st Overall International Tour de Toona

1st Stage 3

1st Overall Tour of the Gila

1st Stages 2 & 5

1st Overall Euregio Ladies Tour

1st Stage 1

Cascade Cycling Classic

1st Stages 2 & 3 (ITT)

3rd Individual pursuit, 2005–06 UCI Track Cycling World Cup Classics, Sydney
3rd Coupe du Monde Cycliste Féminine de Montréal
6th Overall Redlands Bicycle Classic
6th Overall Tour du Grand Montréal
7th Overall Holland Ladies Tour
2007
National Road Championships

1st Time trial
2nd Road race

1st Overall North Star Grand Prix

1st Stages 3 (ITT), 5 & 6

1st Overall Holland Ladies Tour

1st Mountains classification
1st Stage 7 (ITT)

1st Overall International Tour de Toona

1st Stage 6

1st Souvenir Magali Pache
2nd UCI Road World Championships – Women's time trial
5th La Flèche Wallonne Féminine
2008
1st Time trial, Summer Olympics
1st Overall Women's Tour of New Zealand

1st Stages 3 & 5 (ITT)

1st Overall North Star Grand Prix

1st Stages 1, 3 (ITT), 5 & 6

1st Overall Cascade Cycling Classic

1st Stages 1, 3 (ITT) & 5

1st Novilon Eurocup Ronde van Drenthe
1st Boise Twilight Criterium
2nd Tour of Flanders for Women
3rd Team pursuit, 2007–08 UCI Track Cycling World Cup Classics, Los Angeles
5th UCI Road World Championships – Women's time trial
5th Coupe du Monde Cycliste Féminine de Montréal
10th Ronde van Drenthe
2009
UCI Road World Championships

1st UCI Road World Championships – Women's time trial
4th Road race

1st Overall Tour of the Gila

1st Stages 1, 3 (ITT) & 5

1st Overall North Star Grand Prix

1st Stages 1 (ITT) & 6

1st Overall Tour Cycliste Féminin International de l'Ardèche

1st Stage 3

1st Tour de Berne
1st Open de Suède Vårgårda TTT
3rd Trofeo Alfredo Binda-Comune di Cittiglio
4th Overall Tour de l'Aude Cycliste Féminin

1st Stage 5

2011
1st Overall Sea Otter Classic

1st Stages 1, 2 & 3 (ITT)

1st Tour of California Women's Time Trial
2nd Chrono des Nations
3rd Time trial, National Road Championships
3rd Overall North Star Grand Prix

1st Stage 1 (ITT)

4th Overall San Dimas Stage Race
6th Overall Cascade Cycling Classic
7th Overall Redlands Bicycle Classic
2012
1st Time trial, Summer Olympics
1st Overall San Dimas Stage Race

1st Stages 1 & 2 (ITT)

1st Overall Tour of the Gila

1st Stages 1, 2, 3 (ITT) & 5

1st Tour of California Women's Time Trial
1st Stage 1 (ITT) Energiewacht Tour
Cascade Cycling Classic

1st Prologue, Stages 1 & 2 (ITT)

2nd Tour of Flanders for Women
8th Overall Women's Tour of New Zealand

1st Stage 1 (ITT)

2015
1st Time trial, National Road Championships
1st Overall Women's USA Pro Challenge

1st Stage 1 (ITT)

1st Stage 3 (ITT) Redlands Bicycle Classic
2nd Overall Cascade Cycling Classic

1st Stages 1 & 2 (ITT)

3rd Tour of California Women's Time Trial
5th UCI Road World Championships – Women's time trial
2016
1st Time trial, Summer Olympics
1st Overall San Dimas Stage Race

1st Stage 1 (ITT)

1st Overall Redlands Bicycle Classic

1st Stage 3

2nd Overall Tour of the Gila

1st Stage 3 (ITT)

2nd Overall Tour of California

1st Stage 2 (TTT)

2nd Overall Cascade Cycling Classic
3rd Time trial, National Road Championships
