= 2007 UCI Road World Championships – Women's time trial =

Women's Individual Time Trial
2007 UCI Road World Championships
- Rainbow jersey

Race details
- Dates: 26 September in Stuttgart (GER)
- Stages: 1
- Distance: 25.1 km (15.6 mi)
- Winning time: 34' 43"

Medalists
	Gold	Hanka Kupfernagel (GER)
	Silver	Kristin Armstrong (USA)
	Bronze	Christiane Soeder (AUT)

The Women's Individual Time Trial at the 2007 UCI Road World Championships took place on September 26. The Championships were hosted by the German city of Stuttgart, and featured two laps of an urban circuit, amounting to 25.1 kilometres of racing against the clock. Three-time world cyclo-cross champion Hanka Kupfernagel bested defending world time-trial champion Kristin Armstrong and the rest of the field.

== Final classification ==
Rank	Rider	Country	Time
1st place, gold medalist(s)	Hanka Kupfernagel	Germany	34' 43"
2nd place, silver medalist(s)	Kristin Armstrong	United States	+ 24"
3rd place, bronze medalist(s)	Christiane Soeder	Austria	+ 42"
4	Amber Neben	United States	+ 1' 03"
5	Christine Thorburn	United States	+ 1' 11"
6	Priska Doppmann	Switzerland	+ 1' 22"
7	Jeannie Longo-Ciprelli	France	+ 1' 22"
8	Emma Pooley	United Kingdom	+ 1' 33"
9	Karin Thürig	Switzerland	+ 1' 36"
10	Meifang Li	China	+ 1' 38"
11	Mirjam Melchers	Netherlands	+ 1' 50"
12	Zulfiya Zabirova	Kazakhstan	+ 1' 51"
13	Susanne Ljungskog	Sweden	+ 1' 56"
14	Tereza Huriková	Czech Republic	+ 1' 56"
15	Anne Samplonius	Canada	+ 2' 03"
16	Martina Ruzicková	Czech Republic	+ 2' 09"
17	Ellen van Dijk	Netherlands	+ 2' 14"
18	Charlotte Becker	Germany	+ 2' 15"
19	Maryline Salvetat	France	+ 2' 21"
20	Alison Powers	United States	+ 2' 22"
21	Oenone Wood	Australia	+ 2' 23"
22	Edita Pučinskaitė	Lithuania	+ 2' 26"
23	Sara Carrigan	Australia	+ 2' 30"
24	María Isabel Moreno	Spain	+ 2' 36"
25	Wendy Houvenaghel	United Kingdom	+ 2' 40"
26	Emma Johansson	Sweden	+ 2' 42"
27	Trine Schmidt	Denmark	+ 2' 52"
28	An Van Rie	Belgium	+ 3' 00"
29	Svetlana Bubnenkova	Russia	+ 3' 04"
30	Ana Paola Madriñán	Colombia	+ 3' 12"
31	Alex Wrubleski	Canada	+ 3' 14"
32	Anna Zugno	Italy	+ 3' 17"
33	Lesya Kalytovska	Ukraine	+ 3' 18"
34	Marta Vilajosana	Spain	+ 3' 19"
35	Anita Valen	Norway	+ 3' 20"
36	Silvia Valsecchi	Italy	+ 3' 25"
37	Tatyana Antoshyna	Russia	+ 3' 39"
38	Rasa Polikevičiūtė	Lithuania	+ 3' 57"
39	Giuseppina Herrera	Mexico	+ 4' 04"
40	Lee Min-Hye	South Korea	+ 4' 06"
41	Svitlana Halyuk	Ukraine	+ 4' 11"
42	Yongli Liu	China	+ 4' 31"
43	Nontasin Chanpeng	Thailand	+ 4' 37"
44	Lang Meng	China	+ 5' 04"
45	Elissavet Chantzi	Greece	+ 5' 05"
46	Aurelie Halbwachs	Mauritius	+ 5' 46"
47	Chapookam Monrudee	Thailand	+ 5' 58"
48	Evelyn García	El Salvador	+ 6' 08"
49	Lyubov Dombitskaya	Kazakhstan	+ 7' 29"
