= Karin Thürig =

Swiss cyclist

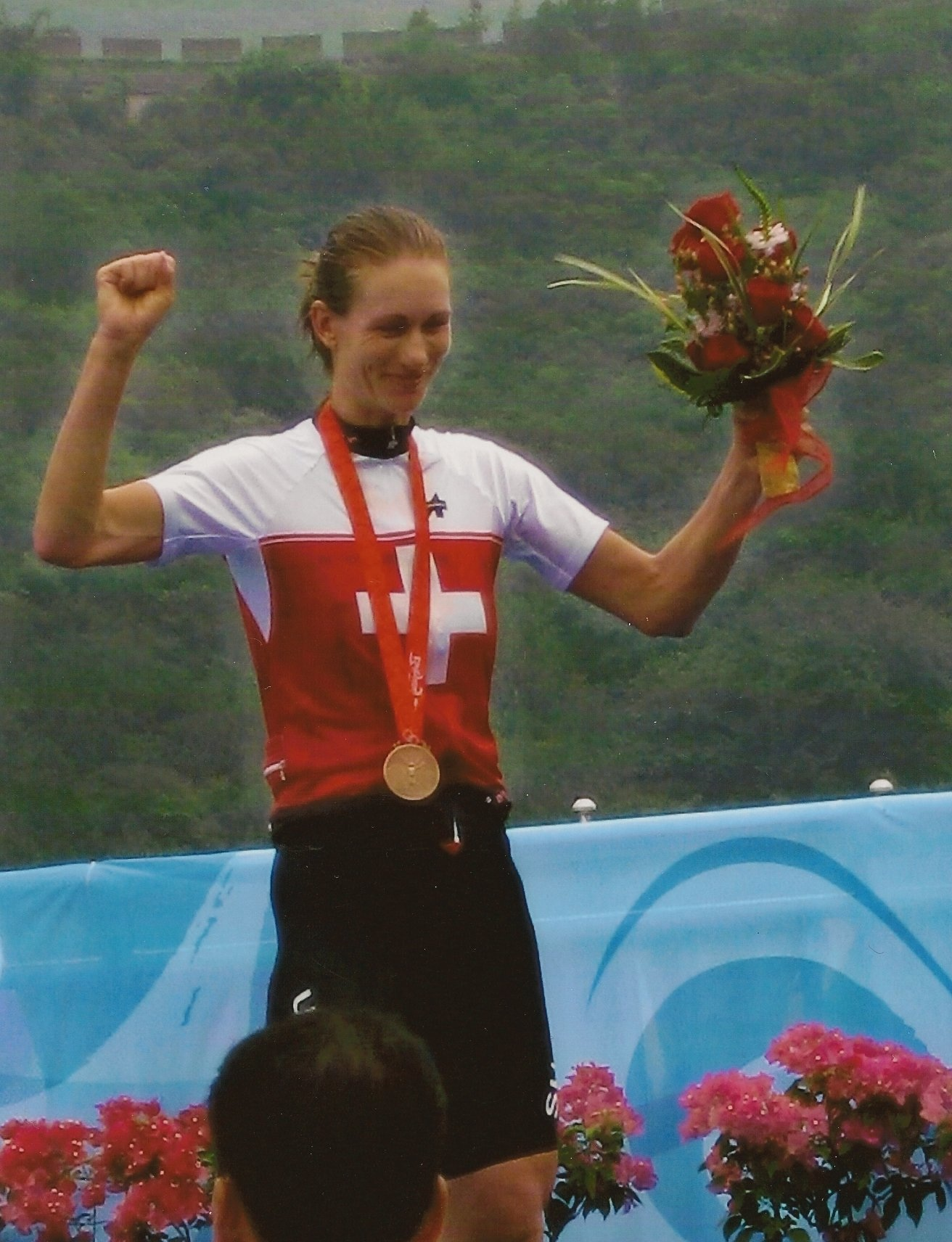

Personal information
- Full name: Karin Thürig
- Born: 4 July 1972 (age 54) Switzerland

Cycling career
- Sport: Cycling
- Disciplines: Road, track, triathlon
- Role: Rider
- Rider type: Time trialist

Professional team
- 2005–2008: Univega/Raleigh/Cervélo-Lifeforce
Medal record
Representing Switzerland
Women's road cycling
Olympic Games
Bronze medal – third place	2004 Athens	Individual time trial
Bronze medal – third place	2008 Beijing	Individual time trial
World Championships
Gold medal – first place	2004 Verona	Individual time trial
Gold medal – first place	2005 Madrid	Individual time trial
Silver medal – second place	2006 Salzburg	Individual time trial
Bronze medal – third place	2002 Zolder/Hasselt	Individual time trial
Women's Track cycling
World Championships
Bronze medal – third place	2005 Los Angeles	Individual pursuit
Women's triathlon
Ironman 70.3 World Championship
Silver medal – second place	2011 Las Vegas	Elite

Karin Thürig (born 4 July 1972 in Rothenburg) is a Swiss professional racing cyclist and triathlete. She is the winner of the 2004 and 2005 UCI Road World Championships – Women's time trial. In 2011, she took second at the Ironman 70.3 World Championship.

== Major results ==
=== Cycling ===
2001
2nd, Individual time trial, National Road Championships

2002
3rd UCI Road World Championships – Women's time trial
1st, Individual time trial, National Road Championships

2003
2003 Track World Cup

1st, Pursuit, Cape Town

4th UCI Road World Championships – Women's time trial

2004
2004 Track World Cup

1st, Pursuit, Moscow
2nd, Pursuit, Sydney

1st, Individual time trial, National Road Championships
1st, Stage 1, Thüringen-Rundfahrt der Frauen
3rd, Individual time trial, Olympic Games, Athens
1st Chrono Champenois-Trophée Européen
1st UCI Road World Championships – Women's time trial

2005
2004–2005 Track World Cup

3rd, Pursuit, Manchester

3rd, Pursuit, Track World Championships, Los Angeles
1st, Souvenir Magali Pache
Tour de l'Aude Cycliste Féminin

1st, Stage 5
1st, Stage 8

1st, Individual time trial, National Road Championships
1st UCI Road World Championships – Women's time trial

2006
1st, Individual time trial, National Road Championships
1st, L'Heure D'Or Féminine / The Ladies Golden Hour (with Nicole Cooke, Priska Doppmann, Christiane Soeder and Joanne Kiesanowski)
1st, Chrono Champenois-Trophée Européen
2nd UCI Road World Championships – Women's time trial

2007
3rd, Souvenir Magali Pache
Grande Boucle Féminine Internationale

1st, Stage 1
2nd, Stage 3b

1st, Individual time trial, National Road Championships
2nd, Open de Suède Vårgårda
1st, Memorial Davide Fardelli – Cronometro Individuale
1st, 2007 Chrono Champenois – Trophée Européen
2007–2008 Track World Cup

3rd, Pursuit, Sydney

9th UCI Road World Championships – Women's time trial

2008
3rd, Individual Time Trial, Olympic Games, Beijing
1st, 2008 Chrono Champenois – Trophée Européen
6th UCI Road World Championships – Women's time trial

2009
9th UCI Road World Championships – Women's time trial

=== Multisport ===
Triathlon
1st, Ironman France 2002
1st, Ironman Zürich 2005
1st, Ironman Lanzarote 2006
1st, Ironman 70.3 Monaco 2006
2nd, Ironman 70.3 Switzerland 2007
1st, Ironman Zürich 2010
1st, Ironman 70.3 Austria 2011
1st, Ironman 70.3 European Championship 2011
2nd, Ironman 70.3 World Championship 2011

Duathlon
World champion, long distance: 2001, 2002
Swiss champion: 2001, 2002, 2003
Overall World Cup champion: 2001, 2002
