= Judith Arndt =

German cyclist (born 1976)

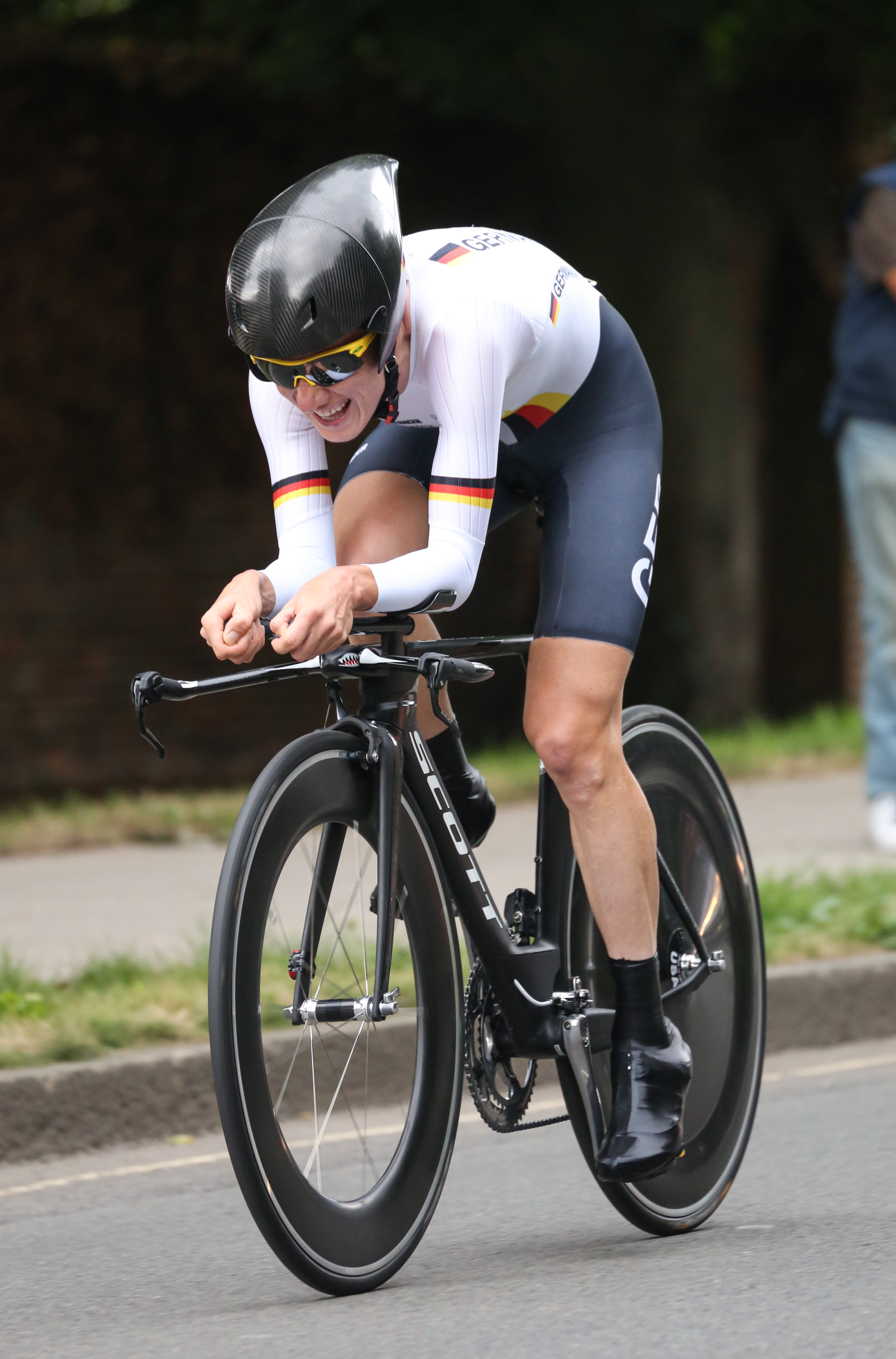
- Arndt competing in the 2012 Olympics time trial in London, where she won silver.

Personal information
- Full name: Judith Arndt
- Born: 23 July 1976 (age 50) Königs Wusterhausen, East Germany

Cycling career
- Sport: Cycling
- Current team: Retired
- Disciplines: Road and Track
- Role: Rider
- Rider type: All-rounder

Professional teams
- 1995–2001: Unknown
- 2002: Saturn
- 2003–2005: Equipe Nurnberger
- 2006–2011: Team T-Mobile Women
- 2012: GreenEDGE-AIS

Major wins
- Stage races Gracia–Orlová (2001, 2005, 2007) Tour de l'Aude Cycliste Féminin (2002, 2003) Tour du Grand Montréal (2004, 2008) Vuelta a Castilla y León (2005) Thüringen-Rundfahrt der Frauen (2007, 2008, 2012) Emakumeen Euskal Bira (2009, 2012) Giro della Toscana Int. Femminile (2010) Women's Tour of New Zealand (2011) Giro del Trentino Alto Adige-Südtirol (2011) Ladies Tour of Qatar (2012) One day races & classics World Road Race Champion (2004) World Time Trial Champion (2011, 2012) National Time Trial Champion (1998, 1999, 2001, 2005, 2011, 2012) National Road Race Champion (1999, 2002, 2012) Rotterdam Tour (2001) Coupe du Monde Cycliste Féminine de Montréal (2006) Open de Suède Vårgårda TTT (2011) Chrono Champenois – Trophée Européen (2011) Memorial Davide Fardelli (2011) Other UCI Road World Cup (2004)
Medal record
Representing Germany
Women's Cycling
Olympic Games
Silver medal – second place	2004 Athens	Road race
Silver medal – second place	2012 London	Time trial
Bronze medal – third place	1996 Atlanta	Individual pursuit
UCI Road World Championships
Gold medal – first place	2004 Verona	Road race
Gold medal – first place	2011 Copenhagen	Time trial
Gold medal – first place	2012 Valkenburg	Time trial
Silver medal – second place	2003 Hamilton	Time trial
Silver medal – second place	2004 Verona	Time trial
Silver medal – second place	2010 Melbourne	Time trial
Bronze medal – third place	1997 San Sebastián	Time trial
Bronze medal – third place	2008 Varese	Road race
Bronze medal – third place	2008 Varese	Time trial
UCI Track World Championships
Gold medal – first place	1997 Perth	Individual pursuit
Silver medal – second place	1999 Berlin	Individual pursuit
Silver medal – second place	1999 Berlin	Points race
Silver medal – second place	2000 Manchester	Individual pursuit
Silver medal – second place	2000 Manchester	Points race
Bronze medal – third place	1998 Bordeaux	Individual pursuit
Representing Orica–AIS
Women's Cycling
World Championships
Silver medal – second place	2012 Valkenburg	Team Time Trial

Judith Arndt (born 23 July 1976) is a retired German professional cyclist, who last rode for the GreenEDGE-AIS cycling team. She won the bronze medal in the 3000 m pursuit event at the 1996 Summer Olympics when she was 20. In 2004, she won the world road race championship and came second in the Olympic road race.

== Career ==
Arndt won the national individual pursuit championship four times and Olympic bronze in the same competition. But a viral infection during the 2000 Summer Olympics – causing a disappointing outcome – marked the turning in her career. In two years, she finished third in the Grande Boucle (sometimes referred to as the "women's Tour de France)" in 2003, won the Tour de l'Aude twice (2002 and 2003), and added a silver medal in the road time trial at the 2003 world championship in Hamilton, Ontario.

At the 2004 Summer Olympics in Athens, Greece she won silver in the road race, and, two weeks later, became world road champion at Verona, Italy. She finished first in the UCI world ranking.

In 2005, she won the national road championship for the sixth time.

Arndt was appointed as a member of the inaugural UCI Athletes' Commission in 2011.

At the 2012 Summer Olympics in London, Great Britain she competed in the Women's road race and won silver in the time trial. She also competed on the track in the Women's team pursuit for the national team. Arndt ended her career after taking gold in the time trial event of the 2012 World Championships.

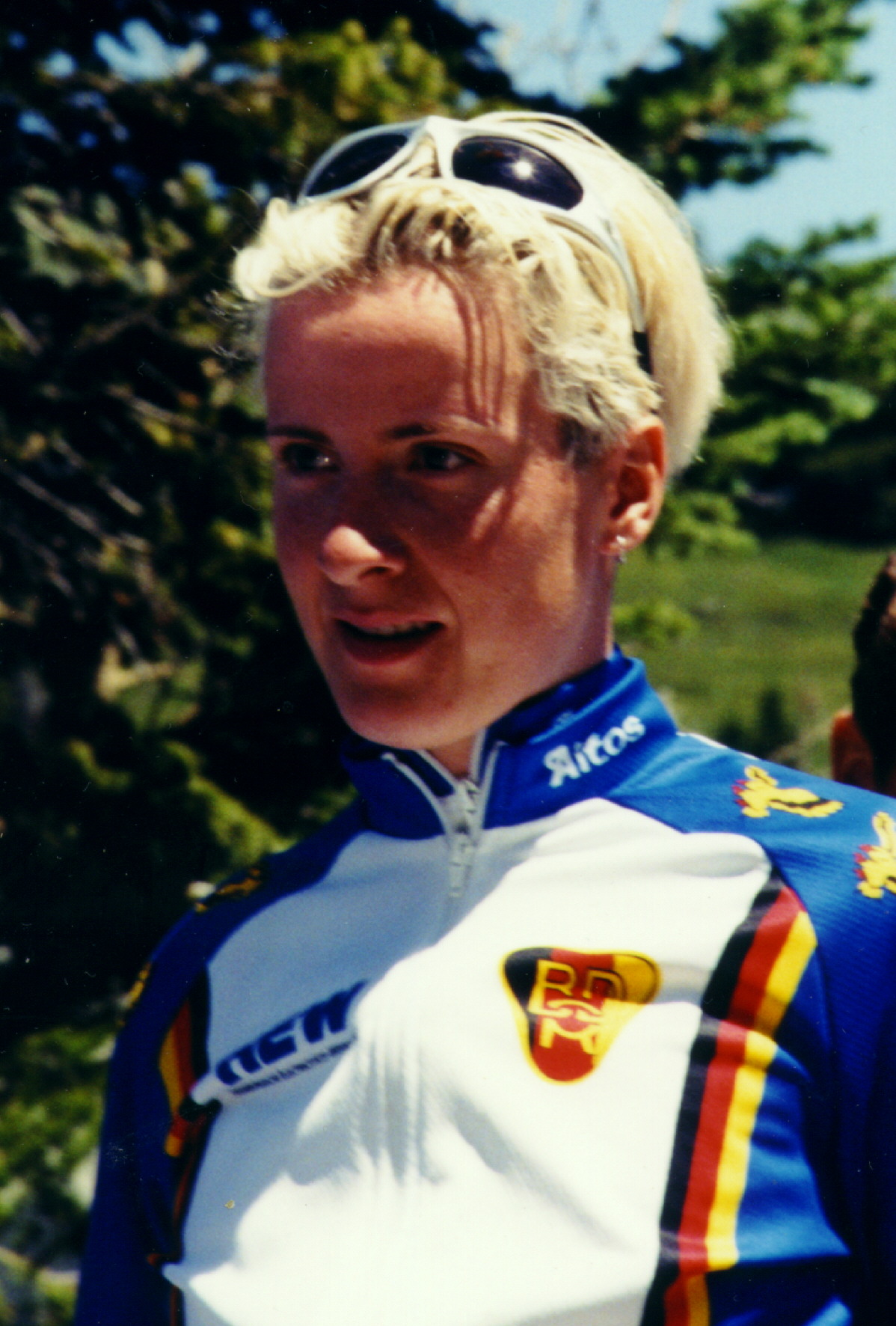
Judith Arndt

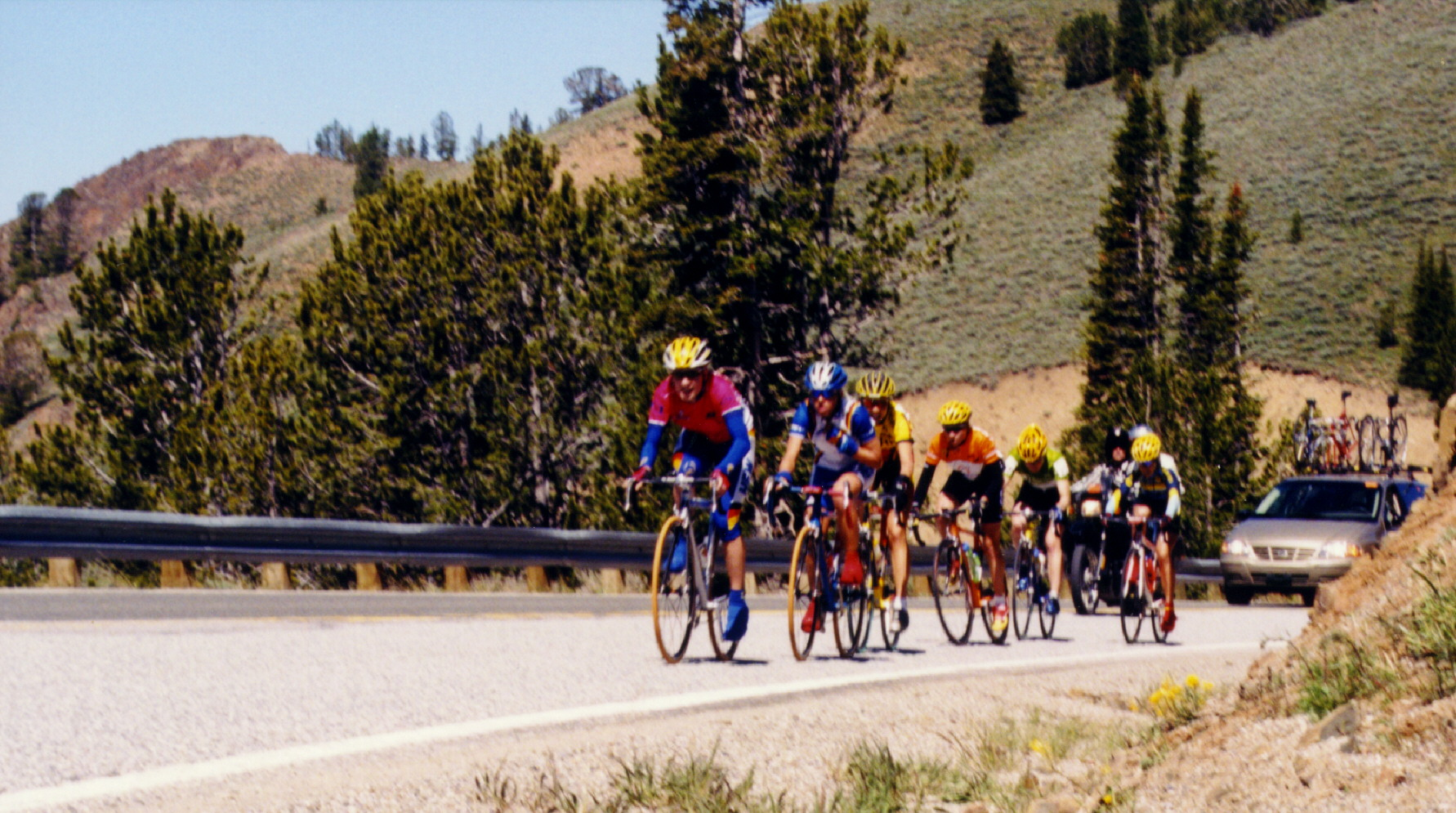
2001 Women's Challenge – in red jersey

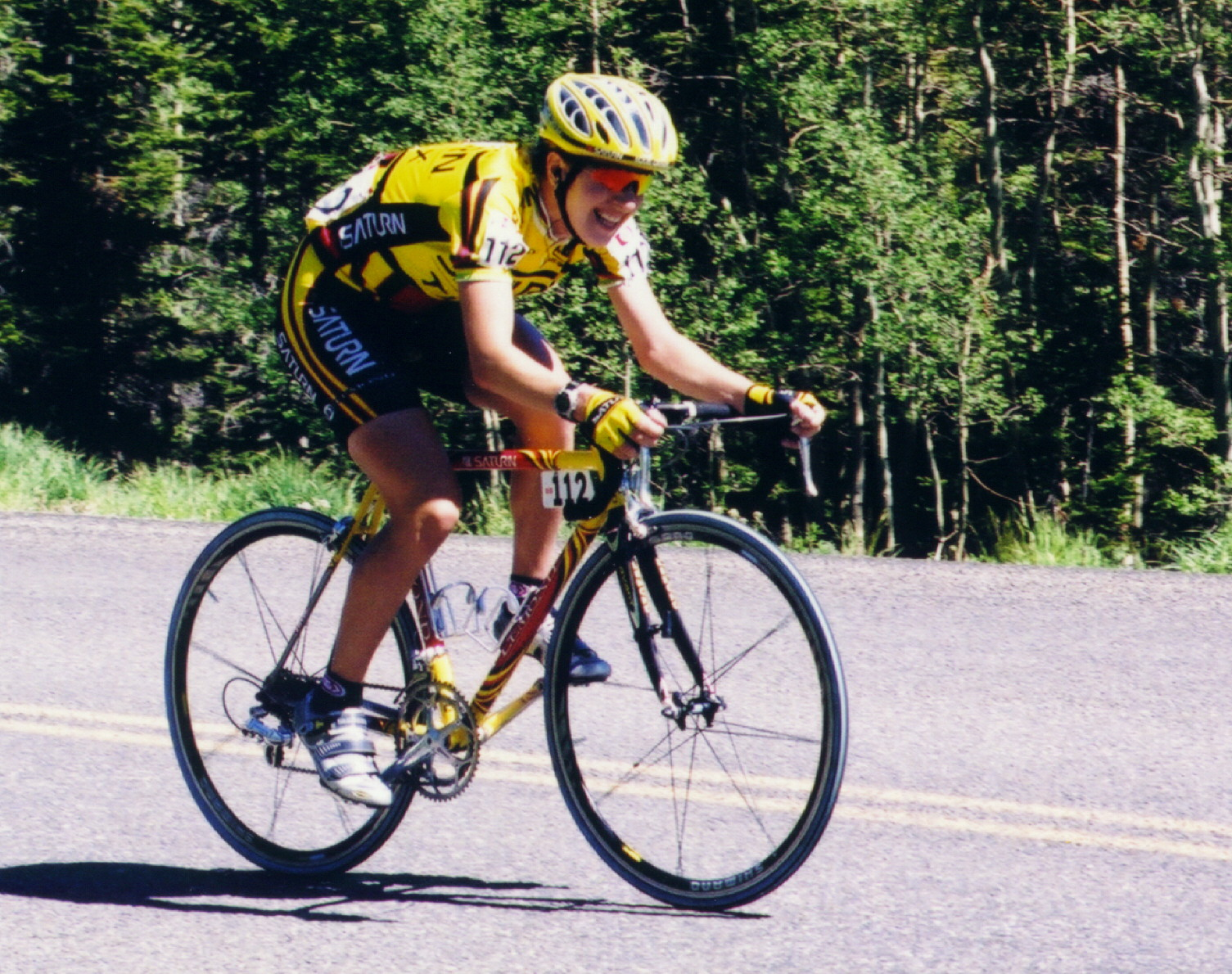
Judith Arndt

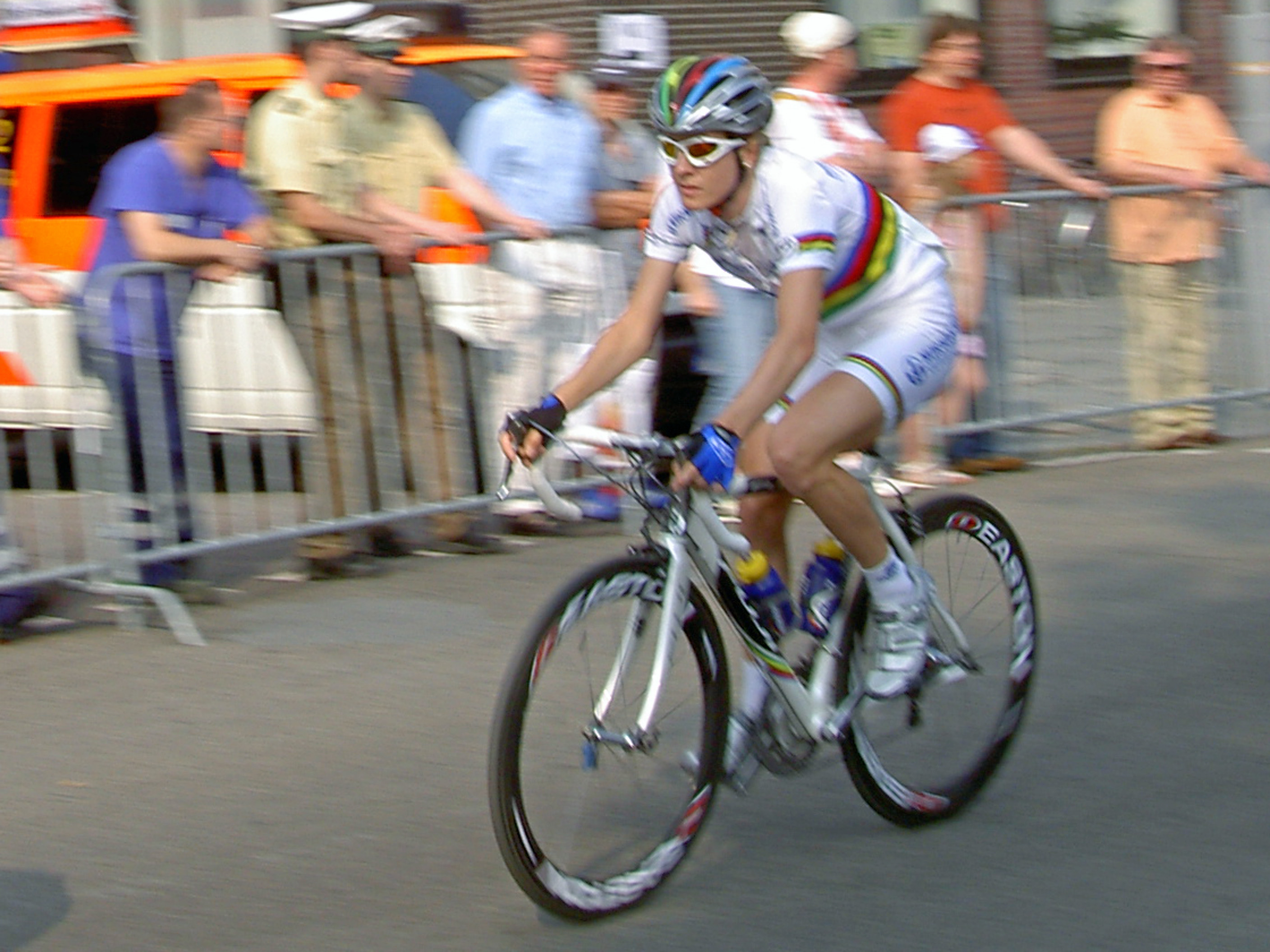
Arndt in 2005

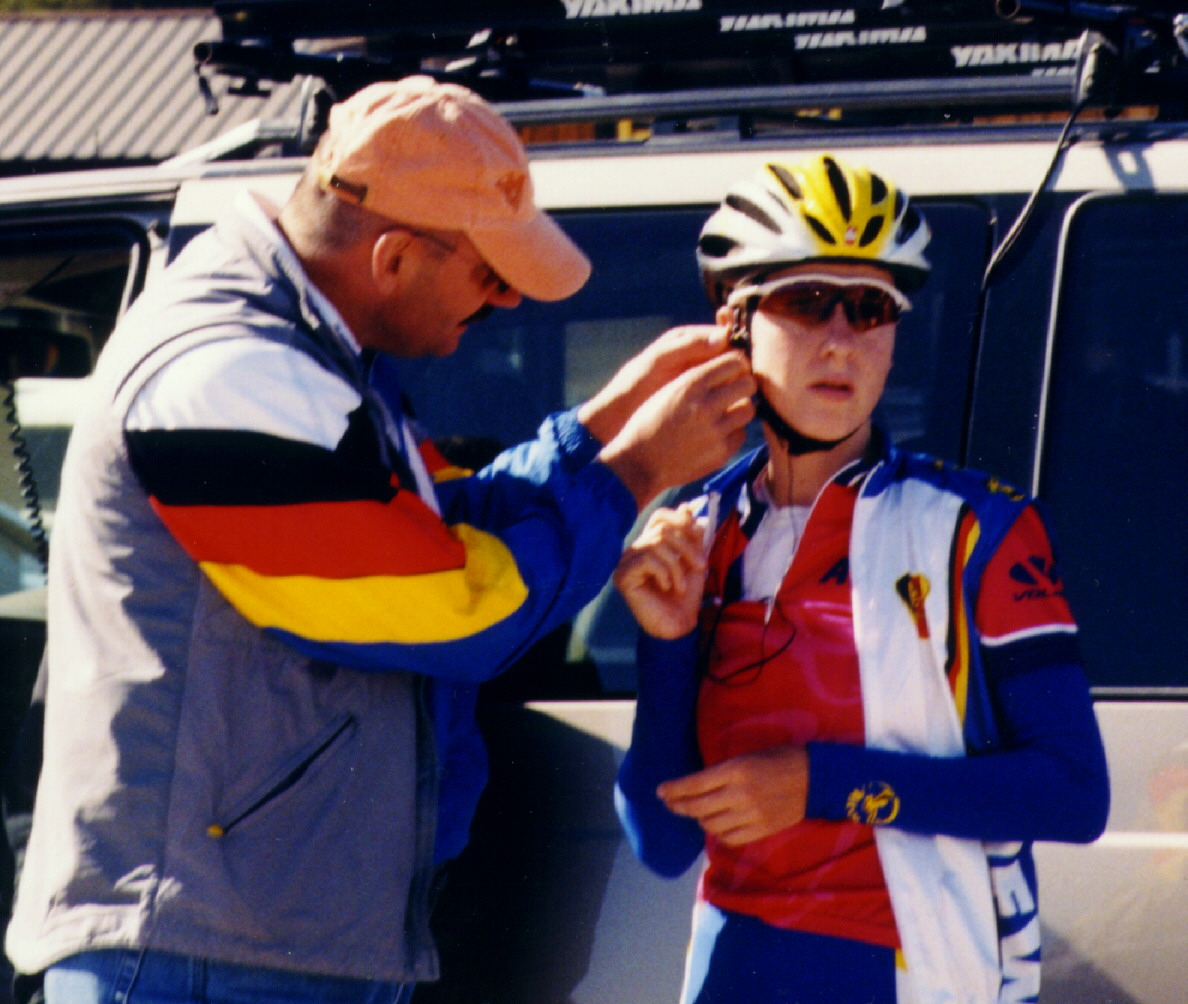
Jochen Dornbusch and Judith Arndt

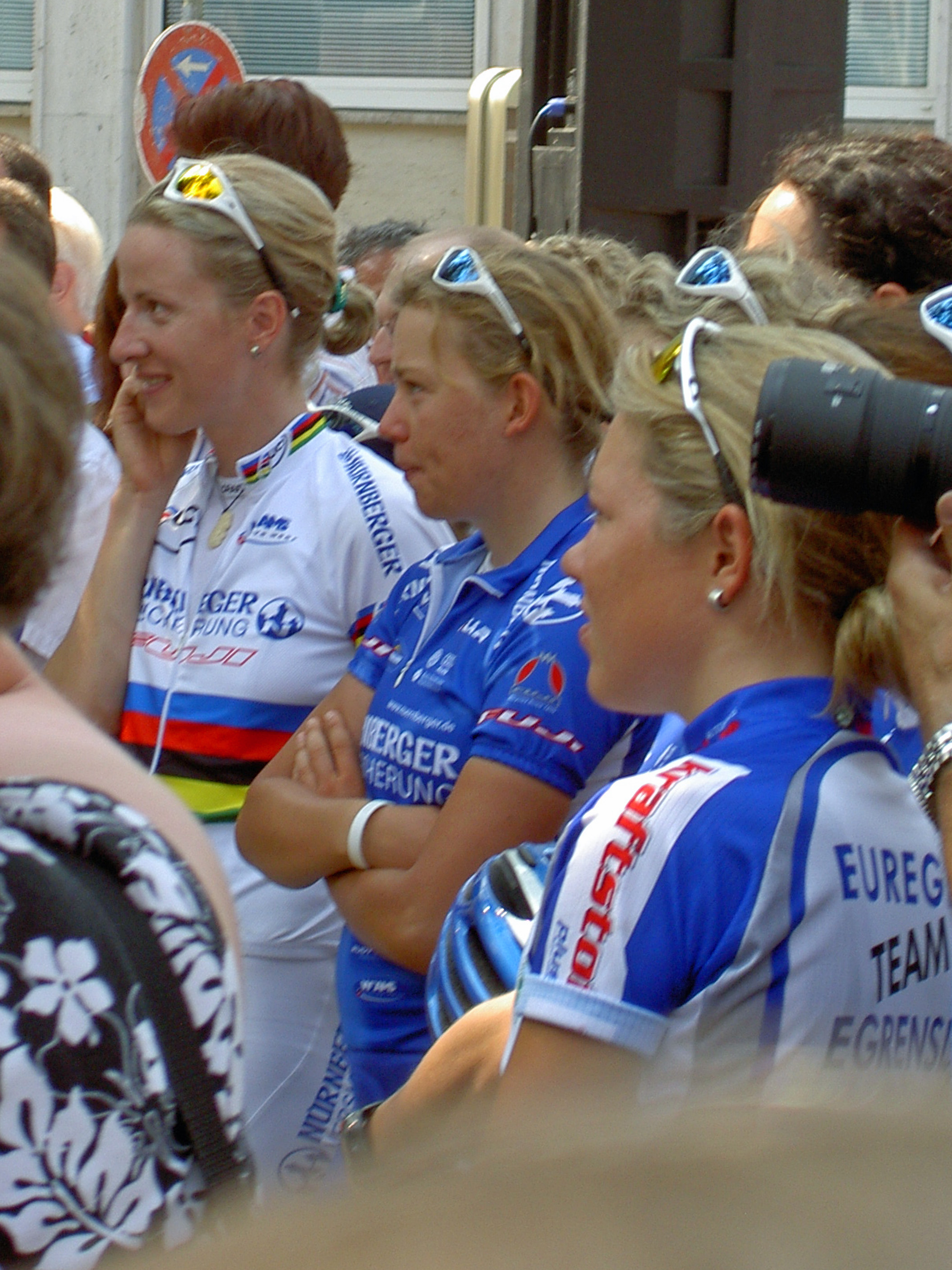
Judith Arndt (left)

== Major results ==
1995
1st Overall Drei Tagen von Pattenson

1 stage win

2nd German time trial championship
2nd Overall Grazia Tour
3rd GP Krasna Lipa

1996
1st National Individual Pursuit Championship
2nd National road championship
2nd Tour du Finistère
3rd Olympic Games Individual Pursuit

1997
1st World Individual Pursuit Championship
1st National Individual Pursuit Championship
3rd National Road Race Championship
3rd UCI Road World Championships – Women's time trial

1998
National Road Championship

1st Time Trial
2nd Road Race Championship

1st National Individual Pursuit Championship
1st Overall GP Mutualité de Haute Garonne

1 Stage win

8th UCI Road World Championships – Women's time trial

1999
National Road Championship

1st Time Trial
1st Road Race

1st National Individual Pursuit Championship
1st Tour de Bretagne
2nd Overall Holland Ladies' Tour

1 stage win

6th UCI Road World Championships – Women's time trial

2000
1st National Individual Pursuit Championship
4th Olympic Games Points race
6th Olympic Games Individual pursuit,
7th Olympic Games Time Trial Championship
9th UCI Road World Championships – Women's time trial
10th Overall Women's Challenge
10th Overall Gracia–Orlová

2001
1st National Time Trial Championship
1st Overall Gracia–Orlová

2 stage wins

1st Overall GP Féminin de Bretagne

1 stage win

1st Rotterdam Tour
2nd UCI Road World Cup
2nd Overall Women's Challenge

1 stage win

2nd Overall Tour de l'Aude Cycliste Féminin

1 stage win

2nd Overall Thüringen-Rundfahrt
3rd Overall Grande Boucle Féminine
4th UCI World Championship Road Race
5th UCI Road World Championships – Women's time trial
5th Overall Vuelta Internacional a Mallorca

1 stage win

2002
1st National Road Race Championship
1st Overall Women's Challenge

2 stage wins

1st Overall Tour de l'Aude Cycliste Féminin

1 stage win

1st Overall Tour de Snowy
1st Overall Solano Bicycle Classic
1st Overall Redlands Bicycle Classic

2 stage wins

1 stage win Grande Boucle Féminin
2nd Overall Vuelta a Castilla y León

1 stage win

4th Overall Thüringen-Rundfahrt der Frauen
5th Overall UCI road World Cup
5th Montréal
9th UCI Road World Championships – Women's time trial

2003
1st Overall Tour de l'Aude Cycliste Féminin
1st Overall GP Feminin du Canada

1 stage win

UCI Road World Championships

2nd UCI Road World Championships – Women's time trial
8th Road Race

2nd GP de Plouay
2nd Overall Gracia–Orlová

2 stage wins

3rd Overall Grande Boucle

3 stage wins

3rd Overall UCI Road World Cup
3rd Montreal World Cup
3rd Sydney World Cup
4th Overall Thüringen-Rundfahrt der Frauen
5th Damesronde van Drenthe
5th Overall Vuelta a Castilla y León

2004
1st Overall UCI Road World Cup
UCI Road World Championships

1st Road race
2nd UCI Road World Championships – Women's time trial

1st Overall Tour du Grand Montréal

1 stage win

2nd Olympic Games Road Race Championship
2nd Coupe du Monde Cycliste Féminine de Montréal
2nd Overall Tour de l'Aude Cycliste Féminin
2nd Overall Thüringen-Rundfahrt der Frauen
5th Overall Giro della Toscana
5th La Flèche Wallonne Féminine

2005
1st National Time Trial Championship
1st Overall Gracia–Orlová

2 stage wins

1st Overall Vuelta a Castilla y León

1 stage win

1st GP of Wales World Cup
2nd GP Feminas Castilla y León
3rd Overall UCI Road World Cup
3rd Overall Giro del Trentino
3rd Overall Thüringen-Rundfahrt der Frauen
3rd Overall Damesronde van Drenthe
3rd Overall Geelong Tour
3rd La Flèche Wallonne Féminine
4th UCI Road World Championships – Women's time trial

2006
1st Coupe du Monde Cycliste Féminine de Montréal
2nd Geelong World Cup
2nd La Flèche Wallonne Féminine
2nd GP Feminas Castilla y León
3rd Overall Holland Ladies Tour
4th Overall UCI Road World Cup
7th UCI Road World Championships – Women's time trial

2007
1st Overall Gracia–Orlová

2 stage wins

1st Overall Thüringen-Rundfahrt der Frauen
1st Stage 3 (ITT) Tour du Grand Montréal
1st Stage 6 Giro d'Italia Femminile
2nd Overall Holland Ladies Tour

1 stage win

3rd Overall Tour de l'Aude Cycliste Féminin
3rd La Flèche Wallonne Féminine

2008
1st Overall Thüringen-Rundfahrt
1st Coupe du Monde Cycliste Féminine de Montréal
2nd Overall 2008 Tour de l'Aude Cycliste Féminin
3rd La Flèche Wallonne Féminine
3rd UCI Road World Championships – Women's time trial
5th Overall Holland Ladies Tour

2009
1st Overall Iurreta-Emakumeen Bira

1st Stages 1, 3 & 5

1st Stage 7 Giro d'Italia Femminile
2nd Durango-Durango Emakumeen Saria
4th UCI Road World Championships – Women's time trial
5th Overall Giro del Trentino Alto Adige-Südtirol
6th UCI Road World Championships – Women's road race
7th Overall Giro della Toscana Int. Femminile
9th Overall Tour du Grand Montréal

2010
1st Overall Giro della Toscana Int. Femminile
2nd Overall Giro d'Italia Femminile
2nd Overall La Route de France

1st Stage 6

2nd Overall Giro del Trentino Alto Adige-Südtirol
UCI Road World Championships

2nd UCI Road World Championships – Women's time trial
5th Road Race

2nd GP Ciudad de Valladolid
2nd Grand Prix de Suisse
2nd Coupe des nations Ville Saguenay
2nd Open de Suède Vårgårda TTT
3rd Overall Iurreta-Emakumeen Bira

1st Stage 1

3rd Australian Open Road Championships
4th Durango-Durango Emakumeen Saria
4th GP Plouay
8th Ronde van Vlaanderen
8th Trofeo Alfredo Binda-Comune di Cittiglio
9th La Flèche Wallonne Féminine

2011
1st UCI Road World Championships – Women's time trial
1st Overall Women's Tour of New Zealand

1st Stages 1 & 2

1st Overall Giro del Trentino Alto Adige-Südtirol

1st Stage 2

National Road Championships

1st Time Trial
2nd Road Race

1st Open de Suède Vårgårda TTT
1st Memorial Davide Fardelli – Cronometro Individuale
1st Chrono Champenois – Trophée Européen
1st Stage 6 Internationale Thüringen Rundfahrt der Frauen
1st Stages 1, 3 & 5 Premondiale Giro Toscana Int. Femminile
2nd Grand Prix Elsy Jacobs
2nd Grand-prix Nicolas Frantz
3rd Overall Giro d'Italia Femminile
3rd Overall Iurreta-Emakumeen Bira
3rd Durango-Durango Emakumeen Saria
3rd La Flèche Wallonne Féminine
4th Australian Open Road Championships
4th GP Ciudad de Valladolid
5th Tour of Flanders
7th Trofeo Alfredo Binda-Comune di Cittiglio
7th GP de Plouay
9th Open de Suède Vårgårda

2012
UCI Road World Championships

1st UCI Road World Championships – Women's time trial
2nd Team Time Trial
8th Road Race

National Road Championships

1st Time Trial
1st Road Race

1st Overall Ladies Tour of Qatar
1st Overall Thüringen-Rundfahrt der Frauen
1st Overall Emakumeen Euskal Bira
1st Tour of Flanders
2nd Open de Suède Vårgårda TTT
3rd Overall Brainwash Ladies Tour
3rd Durango-Durango Emakumeen Saria
4th Trofeo Alfredo Binda-Comune di Cittiglio
6th Overall Giro d'Italia Femminile
6th La Flèche Wallonne Féminine
9th Overall Women's Tour of New Zealand

1st Stage 3

10th Overall Energiewacht Tour
10th Overall GP Elsy Jacobs
10th Classica Citta di Padova
10th GP de Plouay

== Results timelines ==
Grand Tour results timeline
Stage race	1999	2000	2001	2002	2003	2004	2005	2006	2007	2008	2009	2010	2011	2012
Giro d'Italia Femminile	–	–	–	–	–	–	–	–	–	10	DNF	2	3	6
Stage race results timeline
Stage race	1999	2000	2001	2002	2003	2004	2005	2006	2007	2008	2009	2010	2011	2012
Grand Prix Elsy Jacobs	–	–	–	–	–	–	–	–	–	–	–	–	–	10
Emakumeen Euskal Bira	–	–	–	–	–	–	–	–	–	–	1	3	3	1
Giro del Trentino Alto Adige-Südtirol	–	–	–	–	–	–	3	–	–	–	5	2	1	13
Tour de l'Aude Cycliste Féminin	–	–	2	1	1	2	–	–	3	2	Did not exist			
Internationale Thüringen Rundfahrt der Frauen	–	–	2	4	4	2	3	1	1	–	–	–	13	1
Giro della Toscana	–	–	–	–	–	5	–	–	–	–	7	1	DNF	–
Grande Boucle Féminine Internationale	–	–	3		3	Did not exist								
Boels Rental Ladies Tour	2	–	–	–	–	–	–	3	2	5	–	–	–	3

== Private life ==
Arndt has lived in Leipzig since 1996, with her partner, fellow cyclist Petra Rossner. The couple became Gay Games ambassadors in 2005. In 2012, after the World Cup, she was in a relationship with Australian lawyer, and former cyclist Anna Wilson, and moved to Melbourne. She is a lesbian.
