= 2006 UCI Road World Championships =

Cycling world championships

- Location within Salzburg Location within Austria
- Venue: Salzburg, Austria
- Date: 19–24 September 2006
- Coordinates: 47°48′N 13°2′E
- Events: 6

The 2006 UCI Road World Championships took place in Salzburg, Austria, between September 19 and September 24, 2006. The event consisted of a road race and a time trial for men, women and men under 23.

The Men's road race saw Italian Olympic champion Paolo Bettini triumph, while Swiss Fabian Cancellara won his first time trial world title.

The women's road race title was won by Marianne Vos, in her first year of racing at senior level.

== Participating nations ==
A total of 574 cyclists from 54 national federations participated. The number of cyclists per nation that competed is shown in parentheses.

Participating nations
Click on a nation to go to the nations' UCI Road World Championships page
- Algeria (3)
- Argentina (6)
- Australia (23)
- Austria (20)
- Belarus (6)
- Belgium (20)
- Brazil (10)
- Bulgaria (5)
- Burkina Faso (3)
- Canada (13)
- China (4)
- Colombia (11)
- Costa Rica (1)
- Croatia (6)
- Czech Republic (18)
- Denmark (16)
- El Salvador (1)
- Estonia (8)
- Finland (2)
- France (24)
- Germany (24)
- Great Britain (12)
- Hungary (8)
- Ireland (9)
- Italy (25)
- Japan (9)
- Kazakhstan (9)
- Kenya (1)
- Latvia (7)
- Lithuania (10)
- Luxembourg (4)
- Mexico (11)
- Moldova (5)
- Namibia (1)
- Netherlands (22)
- New Zealand (6)
- Norway (9)
- Poland (19)
- Portugal (11)
- Romania (1)
- Russia (22)
- Serbia and Montenegro (2)
- Slovakia (11)
- Slovenia (14)
- South Africa (15)
- South Korea (1)
- Spain (23)
- Sweden (12)
- Switzerland (22)
- Ukraine (20)
- United States (21)
- Uruguay (1)
- Uzbekistan (1)
- Venezuela (6)

== Events summary ==
Event	Gold		Silver		Bronze	
Men's Events
Men's road race	Paolo Bettini; Italy	6:15:36	Erik Zabel; Germany	st.	Alejandro Valverde; Spain	st.
Men's time trial	Fabian Cancellara; Switzerland	1:00:11.75	David Zabriskie; United States	1:01:41.72	Alexander Vinokourov; Kazakhstan	1:02:01.47
Women's Events
Women's road race	Marianne Vos; Netherlands	3:20.26	Trixi Worrack; Germany	st.	Nicole Cooke; Great Britain	st.
Women's time trial	Kristin Armstrong; United States	35:04.89	Karin Thürig; Switzerland	35:30.06	Christine Thorburn; United States	35:34.25
Men's Under-23 Events
Men's under-23 road race	Gerald Ciolek; Germany	4:00.50	Romain Feillu; France	st.	Alexander Khatuntsev; Russia	st.
Men's under-23 time trial	Dominique Cornu; Belgium	49:28.42	Mikhail Ignatiev; Russia	50:05.52	Jérôme Coppel; France	50:13.08

== Medals table ==
Place	Nation	1st place, gold medalist(s)	2nd place, silver medalist(s)	3rd place, bronze medalist(s)	Total
1	Germany	1	2	0	3
2	United States	1	1	1	3
3	Switzerland	1	1	0	2
4=	Belgium	1	0	0	1
4=	Italy	1	0	0	1
4=	Netherlands	1	0	0	1
7=	France	0	1	1	2
7=	Russia	0	1	1	2
9=	Great Britain	0	0	1	1
9=	Kazakhstan	0	0	1	1
9=	Spain	0	0	1	1
Total		6	6	6	18

== See also ==
- 2006 World University Cycling Championship
