= Meng Lang (cyclist) =

Chinese cyclist

Meng Lang 孟浪
Personal information
- Born: 6 March 1984 (age 42) Heilongjiang, China

Cycling career
- Sport: Cycling
- Discipline: Road cycling
- Role: Rider

Professional team
- 2008: Chinese Olympic Cycling Team

Meng Lang (Chinese: 孟浪; born March 6, 1984, in Heilongjiang) is a female Chinese racing cyclist, who competed for Team China at the 2008 Summer Olympics.

== Sports career ==
- 1998 Heilongjiang Provincial Cycling and Fencing Training Center;
- 1998 Heilongjiang Provincial Cycling Team;
- 2006 National Team for Intensified Training

== Major performances ==
- 2003/2004 Road National Championships - 1st/2nd individual;
- 2007 Road Asian Championships - 1st individual;
- 2007 Toulouse Days Race - 1st individual road (Stage 10)
