= Jeannie Longo =

French cyclist (born 1958)

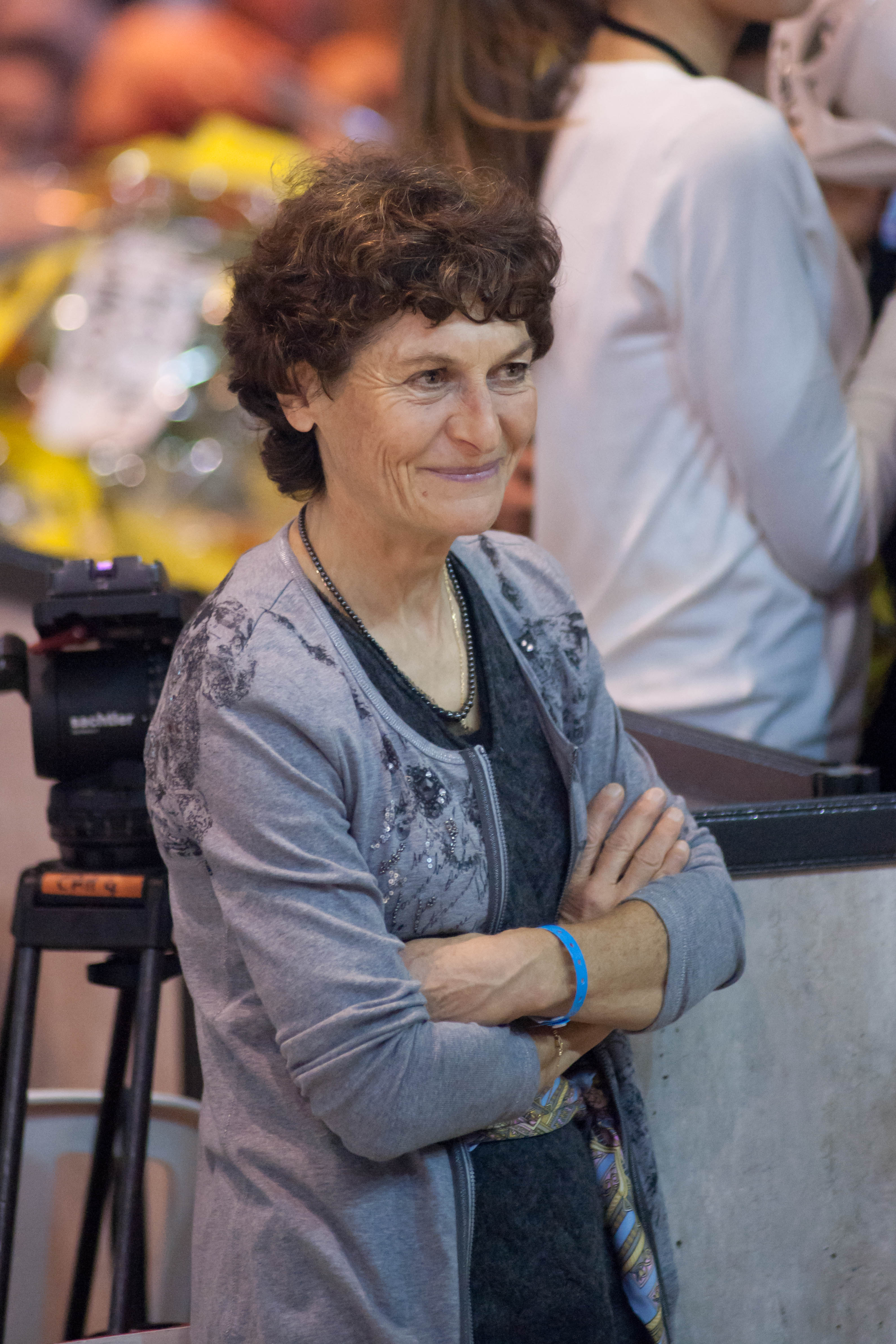
- Longo in 2011

Personal information
- Born: 31 October 1958 (age 68) Annecy, France

Cycling career
- Sport: Cycling
- Disciplines: Track, Road
- Role: Rider

Professional teams
- 1994–1995: Intersport-Nakamura
- 1998–1999: Ebly
- 2007: Team Uniqa Graz
- 2008: Pro Feminin Les Carroz

Major wins
- Stage races Grande Boucle (1987–1989) One-day races Olympic Road Champion (1996) World Road Champion (1985–1987, 1989, 1995) World Time Trial Champion (1995–1997, 2001) National Road Champion (1979–1989, 1992, 1995, 2006, 2008) National Time Trial Champion (1995, 1999, 2001–2003, 2006, 2008–2011) Women's Challenge (1991, 1999) Other Hour record (2000) 45.094 km
Medal record
Women's cycling
Representing France
Olympic Games
Gold medal – first place	1996 Atlanta	Road cycling
Silver medal – second place	1992 Barcelona	Road cycling
Silver medal – second place	1996 Atlanta	Road time trial
Bronze medal – third place	2000 Sydney	Road time trial
UCI Track World Championships
Gold medal – first place	1986 Colorado Springs	3 km pursuit
Gold medal – first place	1988 Ghent	3 km pursuit
Gold medal – first place	1989 Lyon	3 km pursuit
Gold medal – first place	1989 Lyon	Points race
Silver medal – second place	1984 Barcelona	3 km pursuit
Silver medal – second place	1985 Bassano	3 km pursuit
Silver medal – second place	1987 Vienna	3 km pursuit
Bronze medal – third place	1981 Brno	3 km pursuit
Bronze medal – third place	1982 Leicester	3 km pursuit
Bronze medal – third place	1983 Zurich	3 km pursuit
UCI Road World Championships
Gold medal – first place	1985 Giavera del Montello	Road race
Gold medal – first place	1986 Colorado Springs	Road race
Gold medal – first place	1987 Villach	Road race
Gold medal – first place	1989 Chambery	Road race
Gold medal – first place	1995 Duitama	Road race
Gold medal – first place	1995 Duitama	Time trial
Gold medal – first place	1996 Lugano	Time trial
Gold medal – first place	1997 San Sebastian	Time trial
Gold medal – first place	2001 Lisbon	Time trial
Silver medal – second place	1981 Prague	Road race
Silver medal – second place	1993 Oslo	Road race
Silver medal – second place	2000 Plouay	Time trial
Bronze medal – third place	2001 Lisbon	Road race
Bronze medal – third place	1994 Agrigento	Time trial
UCI Mountain Bike World Championships
Silver medal – second place	1993 Métabief	Cross-country
Summer Universiade
Silver medal – second place	1983 Edmonton	Individual pursuit
Bronze medal – third place	1983 Edmonton	Road race

Jeannie Longo (French: [ʒani lɔ̃ɡo]; born 31 October 1958) is a French racing cyclist, 6-time French champion and 13-time world champion. Longo began racing in 1975 and was active in cycling through 2012. She was once widely considered the best female cyclist of all time, although that reputation is now clouded by suspicion of doping throughout her career.

Longo is famous for her competitive nature and her longevity in the sport – when she was selected to compete for France in the 2008 Olympics, it was her seventh Olympic Games; some of Longo's competitors that year had not yet been born when she took part in her first Olympics in 1984. She had stated that 2008 would be her final participation in the Olympics. In the Women's road race, she finished 24th, 33 seconds behind the winner Nicole Cooke, who was one year old when Longo first rode in the Olympics. At the same Olympics, she finished 4th in the road time trial, just two seconds shy of securing a bronze medal.

Longo is currently number two on the all-time list of French female summer or winter Olympic medal winners, with a total of four medals, including one in gold, which is one less than the total number won by the fencer Laura Flessel-Colovic.

== Early life ==
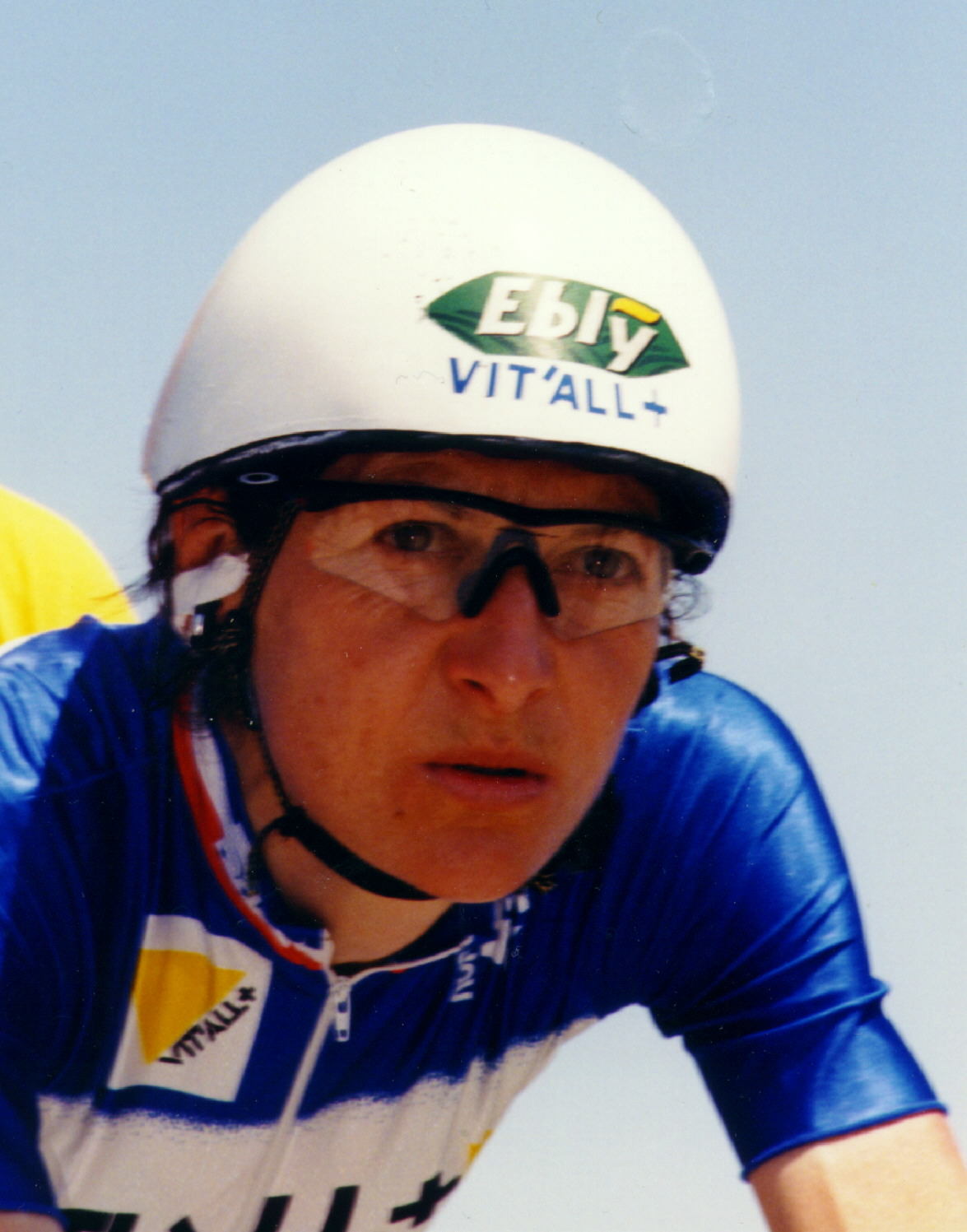
Longo about to start the time trial stage of the 2001 Women's Challenge

Longo was born in Annecy, Haute-Savoie, in the French Alps .

== Career ==
Longo began her athletic career as a downhill skier. After winning the French schools' ski championship and three university skiing championships, she switched to cycling at the urging of her coach (and later husband) Patrice Ciprelli. Within a few months, Longo won the French road race Championship at the age of 21. She competed both in road and track bicycle racing events, and is an Olympic gold medalist and thirteen-time world champion.

=== Doping affairs ===
In September 1987, Longo tested positive for ephedrine following a 3 km world record attempt in Colorado Springs. She served a 1-month ban for this offence.

In September 2011, it was reported that Longo had missed three doping tests and was under investigation by the FFC. Normally, this would be penalized the same as a positive test, but since the French Anti-Doping Agency had failed to notify Longo that she would be targeted for testing in that year, no further action was taken. It subsequently was revealed that Longo's husband, Patrice Ciprelli, had purchased the performance-enhancing drug EPO from China via former American professional cyclist Joe Papp. Ciprelli confessed and claimed that he purchased the EPO for his own personal use. He was found guilty in May 2016, and given a 1-year suspended jail sentence and €12,800 in fines and costs.

== Major results ==
=== Track ===
Note: Beginning in 1997, the Union Cycliste Internationale awarded points to riders based on their performances. For this purpose, the races were classified. Although the system has evolved, the major stage races are category 1 (strongest) and 2. In the listings below, these categories, where known, are in parentheses. GC stands for general classification.

1981
3rd UCI Track World Championship (Individual pursuit)
1982
3rd UCI Track World Championship (Individual pursuit)
1983
2nd Summer Universiade Track Championship (Individual pursuit)
3rd UCI Track World Championship (Individual pursuit)
1984
2nd UCI Track World Championship (Individual pursuit)
1985
2nd UCI Track World Championship (Individual pursuit)
1986
1st UCI Track World Championship (Individual pursuit)
1987
2nd UCI Track World Championship (Individual pursuit)
1988
1st UCI Track World Championship (Individual pursuit)
1989
1st UCI Track World Championship (Points race)
1st UCI Track World Championship (Individual pursuit)
1998
1st French Track Pursuit Championships

=== Mountainbike ===
1993
2nd UCI Mountain Bike Championship

=== Road ===
1979
1st French Road Race Championship
1980
1st French Road Race Championship
1981
1st French Road Race Championship
2nd World Road Race Championships
1982
1st French Road Race Championship
1983
1st French Road Race Championship
3rd Summer Universiade Road Race Championship
1984
1st French Road Race Championship
1985
1st World Road Race Championships
1st French Road Race Championship
1st Coors Classic
1986
1st World Road Race Championships
1st French Road Race Championship
1st Coors Classic
1987
1st World Road Race Championships
1st French Road Race Championship
1st Coors Classic
1988
1st French Road Race Championship
1989
1st World Road Race Championships
1st French Road Race Championship
1992
2nd Olympic Road Race
1st French Road Race Championship
1993
2nd World Road Race Championships
1994
3rd UCI Road World Championships – Women's time trial
1995
1st UCI Road World Championships – Women's time trial
1st French Road Race Championship
1st Overall Emakumeen Bira
1996
1st Olympic Road Race
1st UCI Road World Championships – Women's time trial
1997
1st UCI Road World Championships – Women's time trial
1st Grand Prix des Nations Time Trial
1st Overall Trophée d'Or Féminin

2 Stage victories

1st Overall Tour du Canton de Conques

2 Stage victories

2nd Overall Vuelta a Majorca

1 Stage victory

3rd Overall Interreg-Dreilaender Damen Tour
3rd Overall Trois Jours de Vendee
7th UCI Points list
1998
1st French Road Race Championship
1st 1 Stage Trois Jours de Vendee
1st Mt. Evans Hill Climb (course record)
2nd Montreal World Cup
3rd French Road CCT
3rd Overall Trophée d'Or Féminin
3rd Overall Canberra Cycling Classic (Tour de Snowy)

1 Stage victory

3rd Overall Tour of Aquitaine

1 Stage victory

4th Overall Women's Challenge
5th UCI Road World Championships – Women's time trial
9th World Road Race Championships
10th UCI Points list
1999
9th UCI Road World Championships – Women's time trial
2000
1st Mount Washington Auto Road Bicycle Hillclimb (Course record)
2nd UCI Road World Championships – Women's time trial
3rd Olympic Time Trial
2001
1st UCI Road World Championships – Women's time trial
3rd World Road Race Championships
9th Overall Grande Boucle Féminine
5th Overall Women's Challenge

1st Mountains classification
1 Stage victory

6th Montréal World Cup
6th Grand prix de Haute-Garonne
2002
3rd Chrono Champenois-Trophée Européen
7th UCI Road World Championships – Women's time trial
2003
6th UCI Road World Championships – Women's time trial
6th World Road Race Championship
2004
10th Olympic Games Road Race
1st French Road Race Championship
2005
2nd Chrono Champenois
1st French Road Race Championship
1st French Time Trial Championship
2007
7th UCI Road World Championships – Women's time trial
2008
1st French Road Race Championship
1st French Time Trial Championship
1st Mt. Evans Hill Climb
4th Olympic Games Time Trial
2009
1st Trophée des Grimpeurs, women's.
1st French Time Trial Championship
1st Chrono des Nations
3rd Overall Fitchburg Longsjo Classic
10th UCI Road World Championships – Women's time trial
2010
1st French Time Trial Championship
1st Chrono des Nations
3rd French National Road Race Championship
5th UCI Road World Championships – Women's time trial
2011
1st Pikes Peak Hillclimb
1st French Time Trial Championship

== See also ==
- List of athletes with the most appearances at Olympic Games
- List of doping cases in cycling
