= 1999 UCI Road World Championships – Women's time trial =

Women's Individual Time Trial
1999 UCI Road World Championships
- Rainbow jersey

Race details
- Dates: 5 October 1999 in Verona (ITA)
- Stages: 1
- Distance: 25.8 km (16.0 mi)
- Winning time: 32' 31"

Medalists
	Gold	Leontien Zijlaard (NED)
	Silver	Anna Millward (AUS)
	Bronze	Edita Pučinskaitė (LTU)

The Women's Individual Time Trial at the 1999 UCI Road World Championships was held on Tuesday October 5, 1999, in Verona, Italy, over a total distance of 25.8 kilometres. There were a total number of 40 starters, with one non-starter. The first woman started at 03:00 pm.

== Final classification ==
Rank	Rider	Country	Time
1st place, gold medalist(s)	Leontien Zijlaard	Netherlands	32' 31"
2nd place, silver medalist(s)	Anna Millward	Australia	+ 4"
3rd place, bronze medalist(s)	Edita Pučinskaitė	Lithuania	+ 31"
4	Zulfiya Zabirova	Russia	+ 37"
5	Hanka Kupfernagel	Germany	+ 49"
6	Judith Arndt	Germany	+ 50"
7	Clara Hughes	Canada	+ 51"
8	Diana Žiliūtė	Lithuania	+ 51"
9	Jeannie Longo-Ciprelli	France	+ 54"
10	Kathryn Watt	Australia	+ 1' 08"
11	Marion Clignet	France	+ 1' 10"
12	Elizabeth Emery	United States	+ 1' 18"
13	Emily Robbins	United States	+ 1' 24"
14	Dori Ruano	Spain	+ 1' 27"
15	Tracey Gaudry	Australia	+ 1' 37"
16	Yvonne McGregor	United Kingdom	+ 1' 39"
17	Solrun Flatås	Norway	+ 1' 40"
18	Mari Holden	United States	+ 1' 44"
19	Valentina Polkhanova	Russia	+ 1' 45"
20	Lyne Bessette	Canada	+ 1' 59"
21	Lenka Ilavská	Slovakia	+ 1' 59"
22	Antonella Bellutti	Italy	+ 2' 05"
23	Mirjam Melchers	Netherlands	+ 2' 06"
24	Tetyana Styazhkina	Ukraine	+ 2' 22"
25	Bogumiła Matusiak	Poland	+ 2' 28"
26	Susanne Ljungskog	Sweden	+ 2' 37"
27	Jenny Algelid-Bengtsson	Sweden	+ 2' 41"
28	Anke Erlank	South Africa	+ 2' 41"
29	Chantal Beltman	Netherlands	+ 2' 52"
30	Paola Pezzo	Italy	+ 3' 31"
31	Zinaida Stahurskaya	Belarus	+ 3' 36"
32	Kirsty Robb	New Zealand	+ 3' 38"
33	Tatsiana Makeyeva	Belarus	+ 4' 14"
34	Miho Oki	Japan	+ 4' 17"
35	Valentyna Karpenko	Ukraine	+ 4' 21"
36	Dorota Czynszak	Poland	+ 4' 58"
37	Fatma Galiulina	Uzbekistan	+ 5' 29"
38	Veronika Pare	Hungary	+ 5' 48"
39	Alena Peterková	Czech Republic	+ 5' 54"
