= Draai van de Kaai =

Road bicycle racing event in Roosendaal, the Netherlands

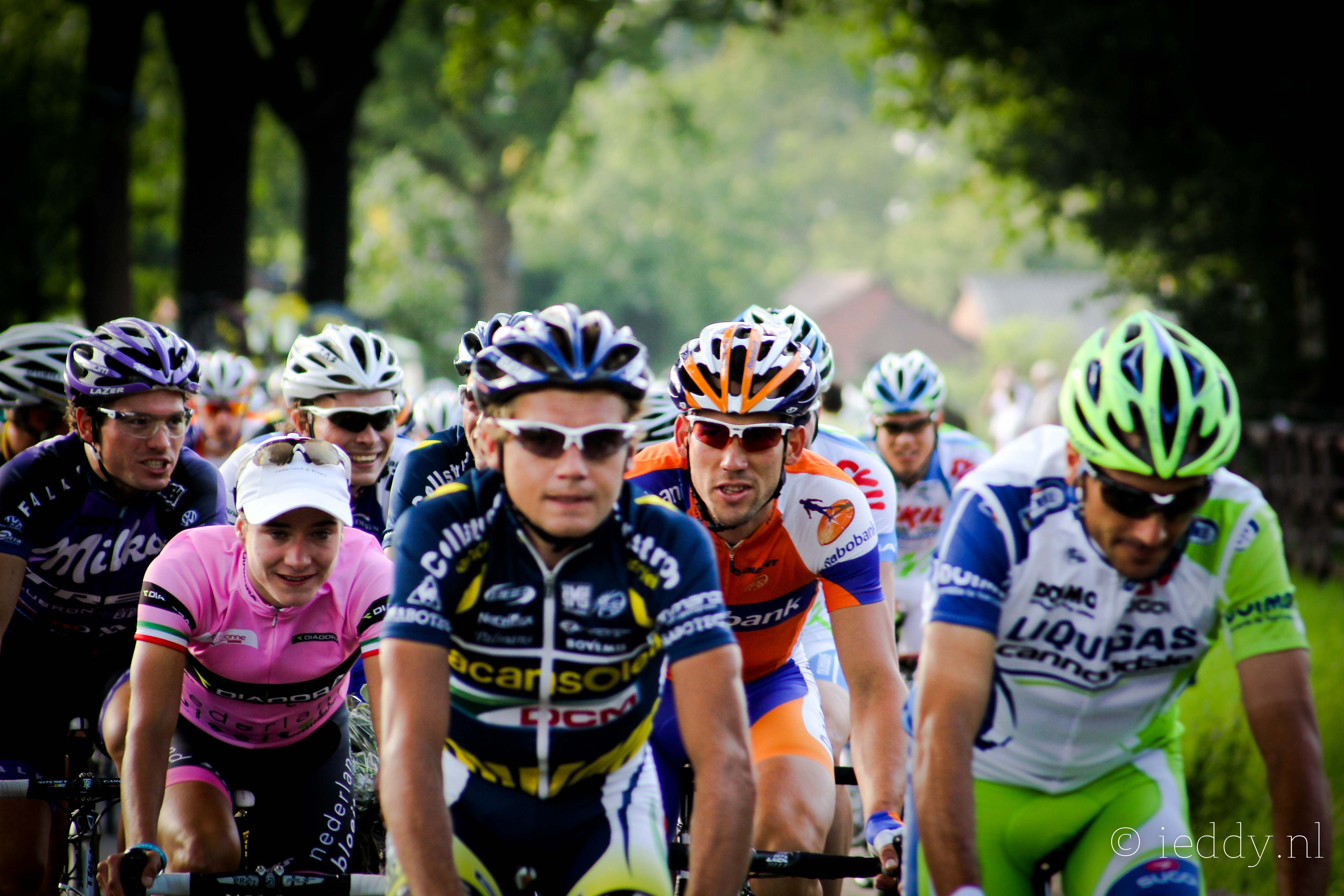

Race details
- Date: 2nd monday after the Tour de France
- Region: Roosendaal, Netherlands
- Local name: Draai van de Kaai (in Dutch)
- Discipline: Road race
- Type: criterium
- Web site: www.dedraai.nl

History
- First edition: Men: 1980; Women: 2001
- Editions: Men: 39 (as of 2018); Women: 18 (as of 2018)
- First winner: Men; Bert Oosterbosch (NED); Women; Leontien van Moorsel (NED)
- Most wins: Men; Jeroen Blijlevens (NED) (2 wins); Michael Boogerd (NED) (2 wins); Nairo Quintana (COL) (2 wins) Women; Marianne Vos (NED) (4 wins)
- Most recent: Men; Piotr Havik (NED); Women; Jeanne Korevaar (NED)

Draai van de Kaai (English: Turn of the Quay) is an elite men's and women's professional road bicycle racing event held annually in Roosendaal, Netherlands on the second Monday after the Tour de France. The first edition was in 1980 and since 2008 the event also includes a women's race.

== Honours ==
=== Men's ===
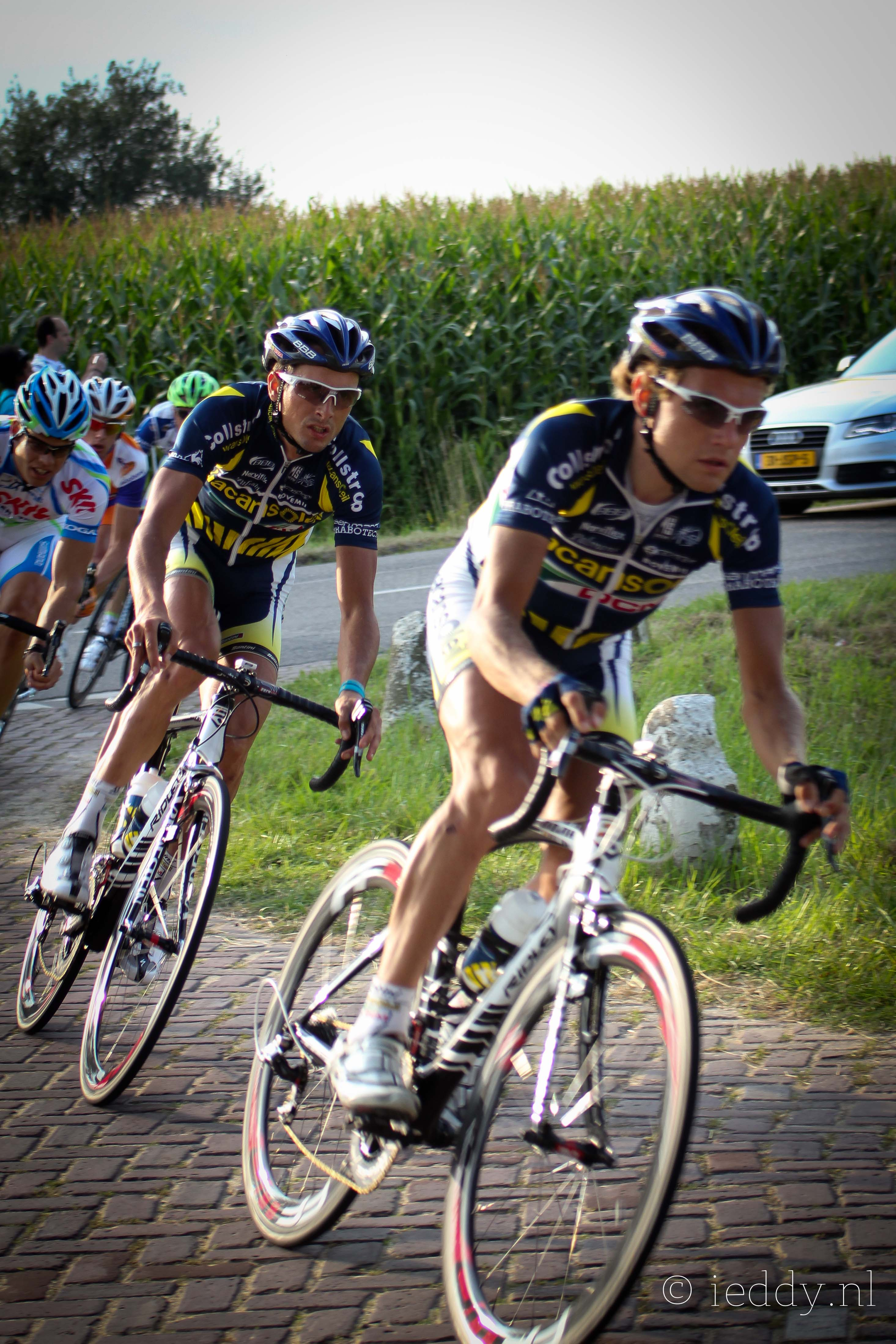
Rob Ruijgh and Johnny Hoogerland in 2011.

Year	Country	Rider	Team
2018	Netherlands	Piotr Havik	
2017	Belgium	Tim Merlier	
2016	Colombia	Jarlinson Pantano	
2015	Colombia	Nairo Quintana	
2014	Germany	Marcel Kittel	
2013	Colombia	Nairo Quintana	
2012	Spain	Alejandro Valverde	
2011	Spain	Samuel Sánchez	
2010	Luxembourg	Andy Schleck	
2009	Great Britain	Mark Cavendish	
2008	Netherlands	Thomas Dekker	
2007	Spain	Alberto Contador	
2006	Spain	Óscar Freire	
2005	Italy	Ivan Basso	
2004	Belgium	Tom Boonen	
2003	Kazakhstan	Alexander Vinokourov	
2002	Netherlands	Michael Boogerd	
2001	France	Laurent Jalabert	
2000	France	Richard Virenque	
1999	United States	~~Lance Armstrong~~	
1998	Netherlands	Michael Boogerd	
1997	Germany	Erik Zabel	
1996	Netherlands	Jeroen Blijlevens	
1995	Netherlands	Jeroen Blijlevens	
1994	Uzbekistan	Djamolidine Abdoujaparov	
1993	Italy	Mario Cipollini	
1992	Netherlands	Tristan Hoffman	
1991	Italy	Claudio Chiappucci	
1990	Netherlands	Erik Breukink	
1989	Australia	Phil Anderson	
1988	Netherlands	Steven Rooks	
1987	Netherlands	Jos Lammertink	
1986	Netherlands	Johan van der Velde	
1985	Netherlands	Joop Zoetemelk	
1984	Netherlands	Adrie van der Poel	
1983	Netherlands	Frits Pirard	
1982	Netherlands	Adri van Houwelingen	
1981	Netherlands	Gerrie Knetemann	
1980	Netherlands	Bert Oosterbosch	

=== Women's ===
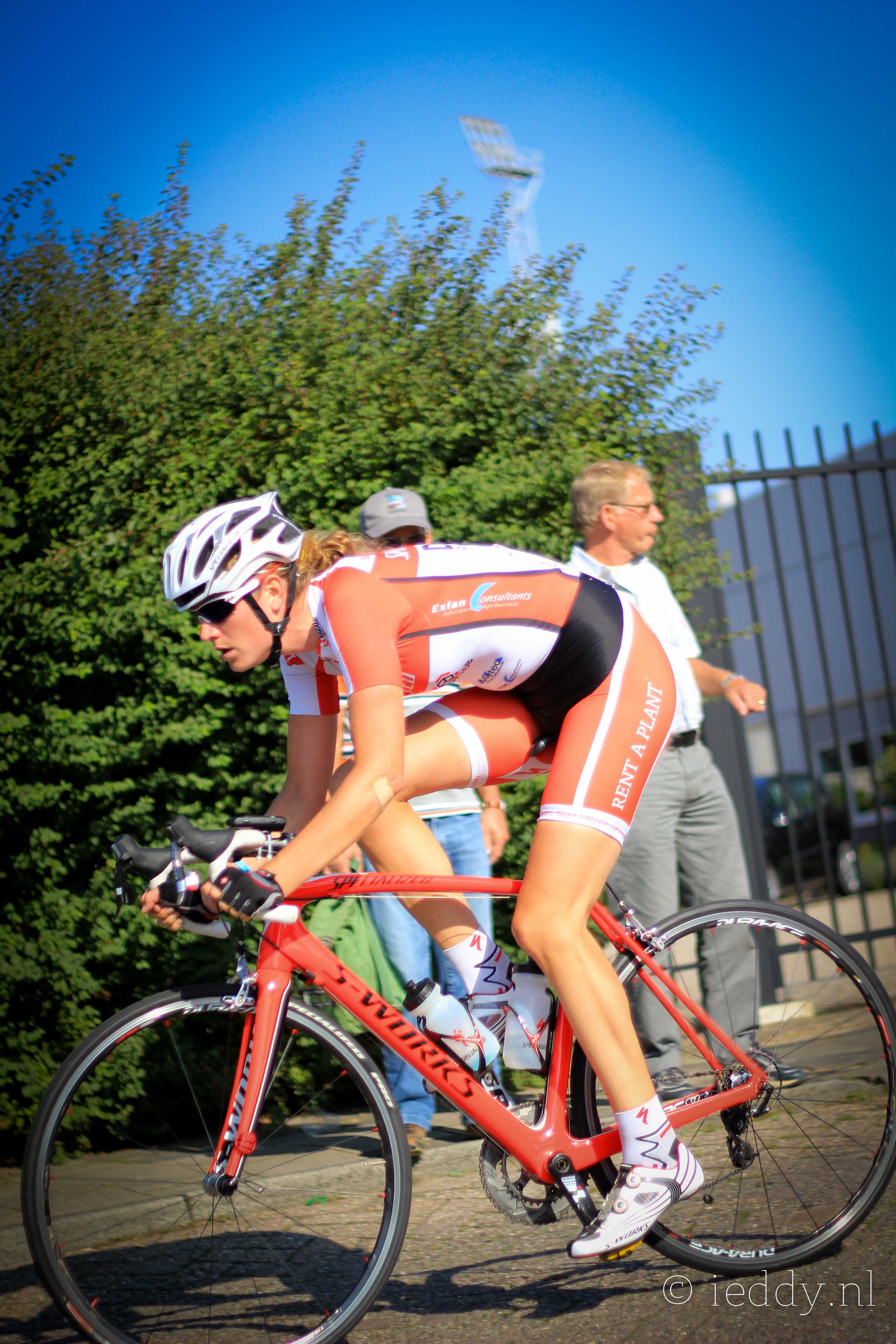
Winner Vera Koedooder in 2011.

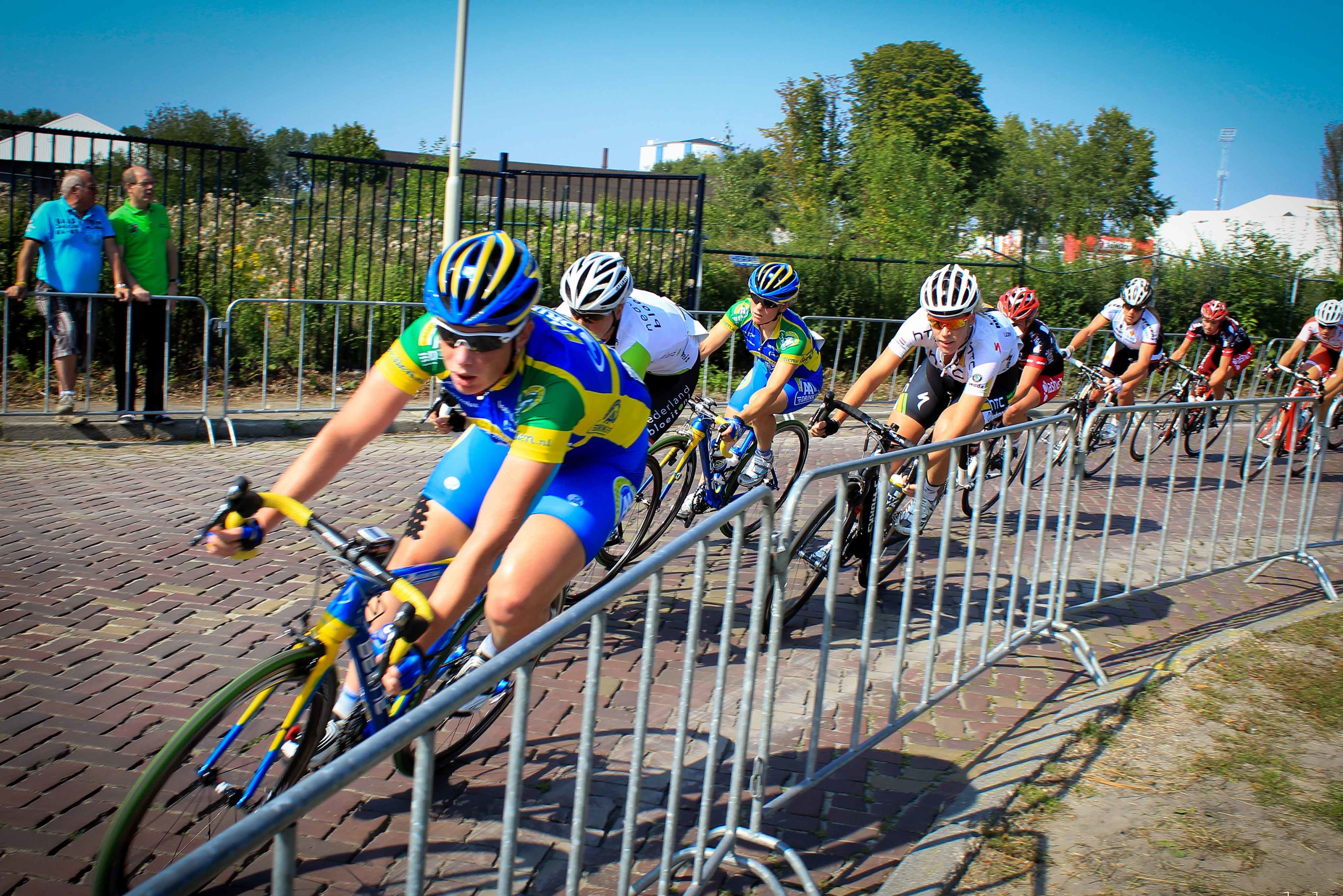
2011 Draai van de Kaai with Kirsten Wild and Ellen van Dijk.

Year	Winner	Second	Third
2018	(Netherlands) Jeanne Korevaar	(Netherlands) Chantal Blaak	(Netherlands) Nina Kessler
2017	(Netherlands) Sophie de Boer	(Netherlands) Annemiek van Vleuten	(Netherlands) Nina Kessler
2016	(Italy) Valentina Scandolara	(Netherlands) Amy Pieters	(Netherlands) Lucinda Brand
2015	(Netherlands) Lucinda Brand	(Italy) Valentina Scandolara	(Netherlands) Amy Pieters
2014	(Italy) Valentina Scandolara	(Netherlands) Anna van der Breggen	(Netherlands) Marianne Vos
2013	(Italy) Valentina Scandolara	(Sweden) Emma Johansson	(Netherlands) Vera Koedooder
2012	(Netherlands) Iris Slappendel	(Netherlands) Lucinda Brand	(Netherlands) Thalita de Jong
2011	(Netherlands) Vera Koedooder	(Netherlands) Loes Gunnewijk	(Netherlands) Marianne Vos
2010	(Netherlands) Marianne Vos	(Netherlands) Ellen van Dijk	(Germany) Hanka Kupfernagel
2009	(Netherlands) Marianne Vos	(Netherlands) Suzanne de Goede	(Australia) Chloe Hosking
2008	(Germany) Christina Becker	(Netherlands) Suzanne de Goede	(Netherlands) Andre Bosman
2007	(Netherlands) Marianne Vos	(Netherlands) Sissy van Alebeek	(Netherlands) Suzanne de Goede
2006	(Netherlands) Marianne Vos	(Netherlands) Ellen van Dijk	(Netherlands) Sissy van Alebeek
2005	(Netherlands) Mirjam Melchers	(Netherlands) Chantal Beltman	(Netherlands) Sissy van Alebeek
2004	(Netherlands) Mirjam Melchers	(Netherlands) Leontien van Moorsel	(Netherlands) Debby Mansveld
2003	(Netherlands) Sissy van Alebeek	(Germany) Sandra Missbach	(Belgium) Corine Hierckens
2002	(Germany) Sandra Missbach	(Netherlands) Inge Klep	
2001	(Netherlands) Leontien van Moorsel	(Germany) Sandra Missbach	(Netherlands) Debby Mansveld
