= Cycling at the 2000 Summer Olympics – Women's road time trial =

Cycling at the Olympics

Women's road time trial at the Games of the XXVII Olympiad
- Venues: Centennial Parklands
- Date: 30 September 2000
- Competitors: 23 from 13 nations
- Winning time: 42:00.781

Medalists
| 1st place, gold medalist(s) | | Leontien Zijlaard | Netherlands |
| 2nd place, silver medalist(s) | | Mari Holden | United States |
| 3rd place, bronze medalist(s) | | Jeannie Longo-Ciprelli | France |

These are the official results of the Women's Individual Time Trial at the 2000 Summer Olympics in Sydney, Australia. The race was held on Saturday, 30 September 2000 with a race distance of 31.2 km.

== Medallists ==
| Gold | Silver | Bronze |
| Leontien Zijlaard (NED) | Mari Holden (USA) | Jeannie Longo-Ciprelli (FRA) |

== Final classification ==
| RANK | CYCLIST | NATION | TIME |
|---|---|---|---|
| 1 | Leontien Zijlaard | Netherlands | 42:00 |
| 2 | Mari Holden | United States | + 0.37 |
| 3 | Jeannie Longo-Ciprelli | France | + 0.52 |
| 4 | Anna Willson | Australia | + 0.58 |
| 5 | Joane Somarriba Arrola | Spain | + 1.06 |
| 6 | Clara Hughes | Canada | + 1.12 |
| 7 | Judith Arndt | Germany | + 1.31 |
| 8 | Hanka Kupfernagel | Germany | + 1.37 |
| 9 | Diana Žiliūtė | Lithuania | + 1.39 |
| 10 | Edita Pučinskaitė | Lithuania | + 1.48 |
| 11 | Mirjam Melchers | Netherlands | + 2.12 |
| 12 | Zoulfia Zabirova | Russia | + 2.22 |
| 13 | Catherine Marsal | France | + 2.27 |
| 14 | Ceris Gilfillan | Great Britain | + 2.29 |
| 15 | Genevieve Jeanson | Canada | + 2.32 |
| 16 | Karen Kurreck | United States | + 2.33 |
| 17 | Yvonne McGregor | Great Britain | + 2.37 |
| 18 | Teodora Ruano | Spain | + 2.37 |
| 19 | Tetyana Styazhkina | Ukraine | + 2.45 |
| 20 | Solrun Flataas | Norway | + 3.01 |
| 21 | Tracey Gaudry | Australia | + 3.11 |
| 22 | Nicole Brändli | Switzerland | + 3.16 |
| 23 | Olga Slioussareva | Russia | + 3.51 |
| | Alessandra Cappellotto | Italy | DNF |

== Sources ==
Official Report of the 2000 Sydney Summer Olympics available at https://web.archive.org/web/20060622162855/http://www.la84foundation.org/5va/reports_frmst.htm
