= 1998 UCI Road World Championships – Women's time trial =

Women's Individual Time Trial
1998 UCI Road World Championships
- Rainbow jersey

Race details
- Dates: 7 October 1998 in Valkenburg (NED)
- Stages: 1
- Distance: 23 km (14 mi)
- Winning time: 31' 51"

Medalists
| | Gold | Leontien Zijlaard-Van Moorsel (NED) |
| | Silver | Zulfiya Zabirova (RUS) |
| | Bronze | Hanka Kupfernagel (GER) |

The Women's Individual Time Trial at the 1999 World Cycling Championships was held on Wednesday 7 October 1998 from Maastricht to Vilt, within the commune of Valkenburg aan de Geul. The race had a total distance of 23 kilometres. There were a total number of 42 competitors.

== Final classification ==
| Rank | Rider | Country | Time |
|---|---|---|---|
| 1st place, gold medalist(s) | Leontien Zijlaard-Van Moorsel | Netherlands | 31' 51" |
| 2nd place, silver medalist(s) | Zulfiya Zabirova | Russia | + 0" |
| 3rd place, bronze medalist(s) | Hanka Kupfernagel | Germany | + 2" |
| 4 | Diana Žiliūtė | Lithuania | + 20" |
| 5 | Jeannie Longo-Ciprelli | France | + 24" |
| 6 | Kathryn Watt | Australia | + 28" |
| 7 | Mari Holden | United States | + 35" |
| 8 | Judith Arndt | Germany | + 1' 05" |
| 9 | Linda Jackson | Canada | + 1' 25" |
| 10 | Elizabeth Emery | United States | + 1' 28" |
| 11 | Yvonne McGregor | United Kingdom | + 1' 37" |
| 12 | Tracy Gaudry | Australia | + 1' 38" |
| 13 | Alessandra Cappellotto | Italy | + 1' 39" |
| 14 | Anna Millward | Australia | + 1' 44" |
| 15 | Catherine Marsal | France | + 1' 50" |
| 16 | Lenka Ilavská | Slovakia | + 1' 53" |
| 17 | Pia Sundstedt | Finland | + 2' 01" |
| 18 | Heidi Van De Vijver | Belgium | + 2' 05" |
| 19 | Mirjam Melchers | Netherlands | + 2' 20" |
| 20 | Barbara Heeb | Switzerland | + 2' 24" |
| 21 | Albine Caille | France | + 2' 29" |
| 22 | Karen Kurreck | United States | + 2' 35" |
| 23 | Karin Moebes | Switzerland | + 2' 38" |
| 24 | Bogumiła Matusiak | Poland | + 2' 40" |
| 25 | Edita Pučinskaitė | Lithuania | + 2' 51" |
| 26 | Tamara Polyakova | Ukraine | + 3' 00" |
| 27 | Cindy Pieters | Belgium | + 3' 16" |
| 28 | Megan Hughes | United Kingdom | + 3' 19" |
| 29 | Lyne Bessette | Canada | + 3' 21" |
| 30 | Fabiana Luperini | Italy | + 3' 25" |
| 31 | Zinajda Stagourskaya | Belarus | + 3' 30" |
| 32 | Sanna Lehtimäki | Finland | + 3' 38" |
| 33 | Anke Erlank | South Africa | + 3' 48" |
| 34 | Maria Cagigas | Spain | + 4' 05" |
| 35 | Svetlana Samokhvalova | Russia | + 4' 14" |
| 36 | Magdalena Day | South Africa | + 4' 22" |
| 37 | Lada Kozlíková | Czech Republic | + 4' 24" |
| 38 | Larisa Chuyenka | Belarus | + 4' 58" |
| 39 | Malgorzata Wysocka | Poland | + 5' 21" |
| 40 | Marta Vilajosana | Spain | + 5' 28" |
| 41 | Irini Tsouvala | Greece | + 5' 52" |
| 42 | Fatma Galiulina | Uzbekistan | + 7' 32" |
