= 2002 UCI Road World Championships – Women's time trial =

Women's time trial
2002 UCI Road World Championships
- Rainbow jersey

Race details
- Dates: 9 October 2002 in Heusden-Zolder (Belgium)
- Stages: 1
- Distance: 23.2 km (14.4 mi)
- Winning time: 30' 02"

Medalists
	Gold	Zulfiya Zabirova (RUS)
	Silver	Nicole Brändli (SUI)
	Bronze	Karin Thürig (SUI)

The Women's time trial at the 2002 UCI Road World Championships took place over a distance of 23.2 kilometres (14.4 miles) in Heusden-Zolder, in the province of Limburg, Belgium on 9 October 2002.

== Final classification ==
Rank	Rider	Country	Time
1st place, gold medalist(s)	Zulfiya Zabirova	Russia	30' 02"
2nd place, silver medalist(s)	Nicole Brändli	Switzerland	+ 14"
3rd place, bronze medalist(s)	Karin Thürig	Switzerland	+ 15"
4	Joane Somarriba	Spain	+ 15"
5	Sara Carrigan	Australia	+ 20"
6	Olga Slyusareva	Russia	+ 32"
7	Jeannie Longo	France	+ 42"
8	Rasa Polikevičiūtė	Lithuania	+ 44"
9	Judith Arndt	Germany	+ 48"
10	Leontien van Moorsel	Netherlands	+ 51"
11	Teodora Ruano	Spain	+ 1' 06"
12	Catherine Marsal	France	+ 1' 07"
13	Alison Wright	Australia	+ 1' 09"
14	Geneviève Jeanson	Canada	+ 1' 16"
15	Amber Neben	United States	+ 1' 20"
16	Kimberly Bruckner	United States	+ 1' 21"
17	Melissa Holt	New Zealand	+ 1' 25"
18	Edita Pučinskaitė	Lithuania	+ 1' 25"
19	Susanne Ljungskog	Sweden	+ 1' 29"
20	Olga Zabelinskaïa	Russia	+ 1' 34"
21	Giovanna Troldi	Italy	+ 1' 35"
22	Lyne Bessette	Canada	+ 1' 35"
23	Jenny Algelid-Bengtsson	Sweden	+ 1' 37"
24	Mirjam Melchers	Netherlands	+ 1' 40"
25	Bogumiła Matusiak	Poland	+ 1' 41"
26	Zinaida Stahurskaia	Belarus	+ 1' 44"
27	Anita Valen de Vries	Norway	+ 1' 45"
28	Lada Kozlíková	Czech Republic	+ 1' 54"
29	Evy Van Damme	Belgium	+ 2' 00"
30	Tetyana Andrushchenko	Ukraine	+ 2' 01"
31	Edwige Pitel	France	+ 2' 01"
32	Frances Newstead	United Kingdom	+ 2' 12"
33	Kirsty Robb	New Zealand	+ 2' 14"
34	Iryna Chuzhynova	Ukraine	+ 2' 21"
35	María Luisa Calle	Colombia	+ 2' 22"
36	Tina Liebig	Germany	+ 2' 25"
37	Solrun Flataas	Norway	+ 2' 26"
38	Cindy Pieters	Belgium	+ 3' 02"
39	Doris Posch	Austria	+ 3' 05"
40	Geraldine Gill	Ireland	+ 3' 49"
41	Evelyn García	El Salvador	+ 4' 21"
42	Chalime Giourbouz	Greece	+ 4' 44"
