= Christiane Soeder =

Austrian cyclist

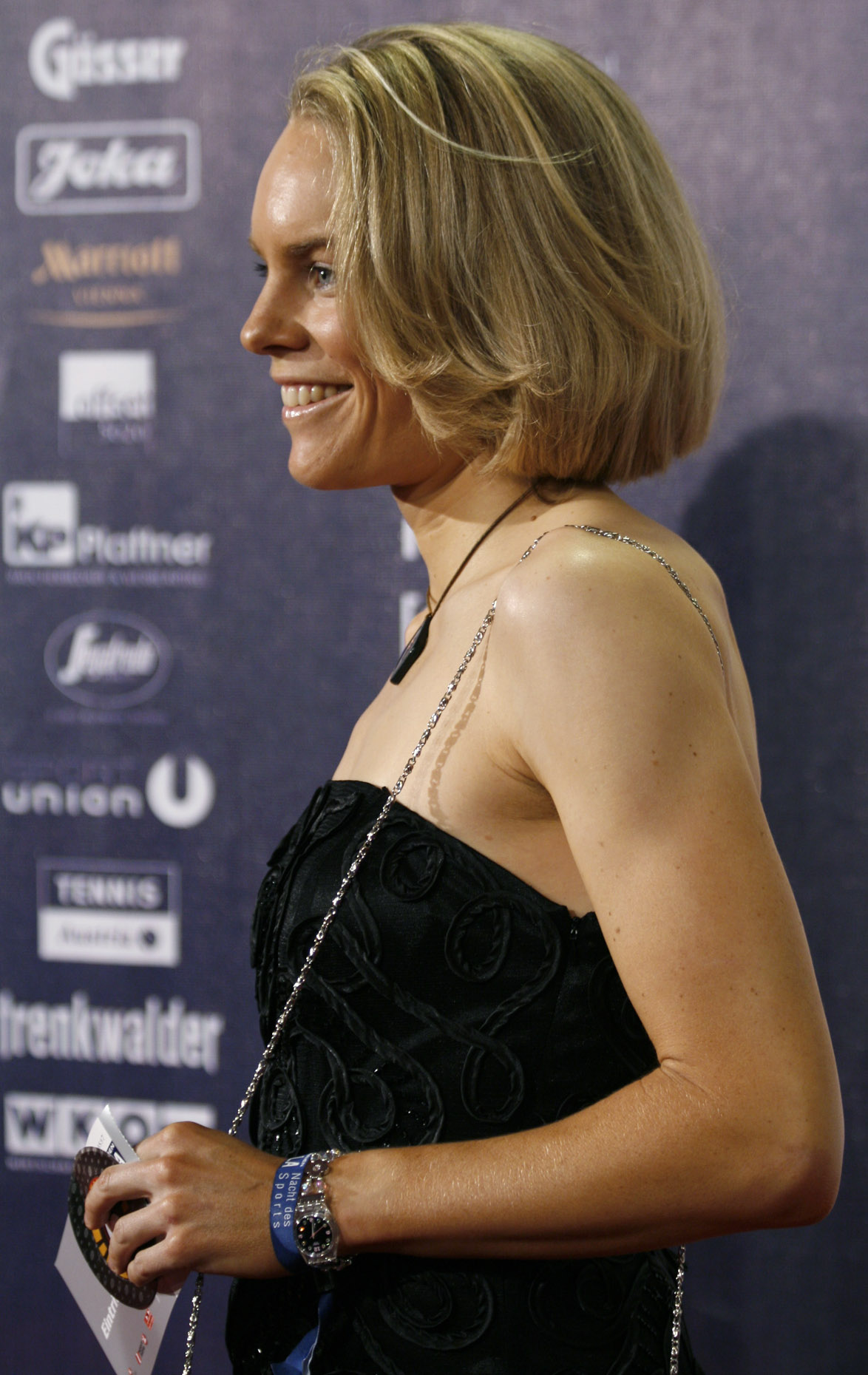
- Christiane Soeder at the 2008 Austrian Sportspersonality of the year awards

Personal information
- Full name: Christiane Soeder
- Born: 15 January 1975 (age 51) Remscheid, West Germany
- Height: 1.60 m (5 ft 3 in)
- Weight: 52 kg (115 lb)

Cycling career
- Sport: Cycling
- Current team: Garmin–Cervélo
- Discipline: Road
- Role: Rider

Professional teams
- 2005: Arbö Askö Graz
- 2006-: Univega Pro Cycling Team
Medal record
Representing Austria
Women's road cycling
World Championships
Silver medal – second place	2008 Varese	Time Trial
Bronze medal – third place	2007 Stuttgart	Time Trial

Christiane Soeder (born 15 January 1975 in Remscheid, North Rhine-Westphalia) is a German-born Austrian road racing cyclist and former duathlete who now lives in Vienna. She won the Austrian National Road Race Championships in 2004, 2006 and 2009. She finished fourth in the 2008 Olympic road race with a time of 3h 32′ 28. She rides professionally for Garmin–Cervélo.

== Major results ==
2002
GP Schwarzwald

2003
National Road Championships (German)

2nd Road Race
2nd Time Trial

2004
National Road Championships

1st Road Race
1st Time Trial

1st Stage 3 Tour de Krasna Lipa
3rd Luk Challenge

2005
National Road Championships

1st Time Trial
2nd Road Race

2nd Souvenir Magali Pache
3rd Overall Tour Cycliste Féminin de la Drôme

1st Prologue & Stage 3a (TTT)

3rd Overall Grande Boucle Féminine Internationale

1st Stage 2

2006
National Road Championships

1st Road Race
1st Time Trial

1st The Ladies Golden Hour
1st Stage 1 Geelong Tour
1st Prologue Thüringen-Rundfahrt der Frauen
2nd Tour of Flanders for Women
2nd Chrono Champenois – Trophée Européen

2007
National Road Championships

1st Time Trial
1st Criterium
5th Road Race

1st Ybbs Chrono
1st Prologue Tour de l'Aude Cycliste Féminin
1st Stage 5a Thüringen-Rundfahrt der Frauen
2nd Souvenir Magali Pache
3rd Sparkassen Giro Bochum
3rd UCI Road World Championships – Women's time trial

2008
National Road Championships

1st Time Trial
1st Criterium

1st Overall Grande Boucle Féminine Internationale

1st Stage 6

1st Open de Suède Vårgårda TTT
1st Souvenir Magali Pache
1st Wiesen Chrono
1st Stage 2 Tour de l'Ardèche
2nd UCI Road World Championships – Women's time trial
Olympic Games

4th Road Race
7th Time Trial

2009
National Road Championships

1st Road Race
1st Time Trial

1st Open de Suède Vårgårda TTT
1st GP Suisse Féminin
1st Souvenir Magali Pache
1st GP Oberbaselbiet
1st Stages 1 & 2 Tour Cycliste Féminin Ardèche Sud Rhone Alpes
2nd Overall Grande Boucle Féminine Internationale

1st Stage 2

5th UCI Road World Championships – Women's time trial
8th La Flèche Wallonne
9th Overall Thüringen-Rundfahrt der Frauen

1st Stage 4

2010
1st Hill Climb, National Road Championships

2012
1st Time Trial, National Road Championships
