= French National Time Trial Championships =

National road cycling championship in France

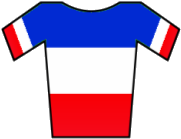
The champion's jersey

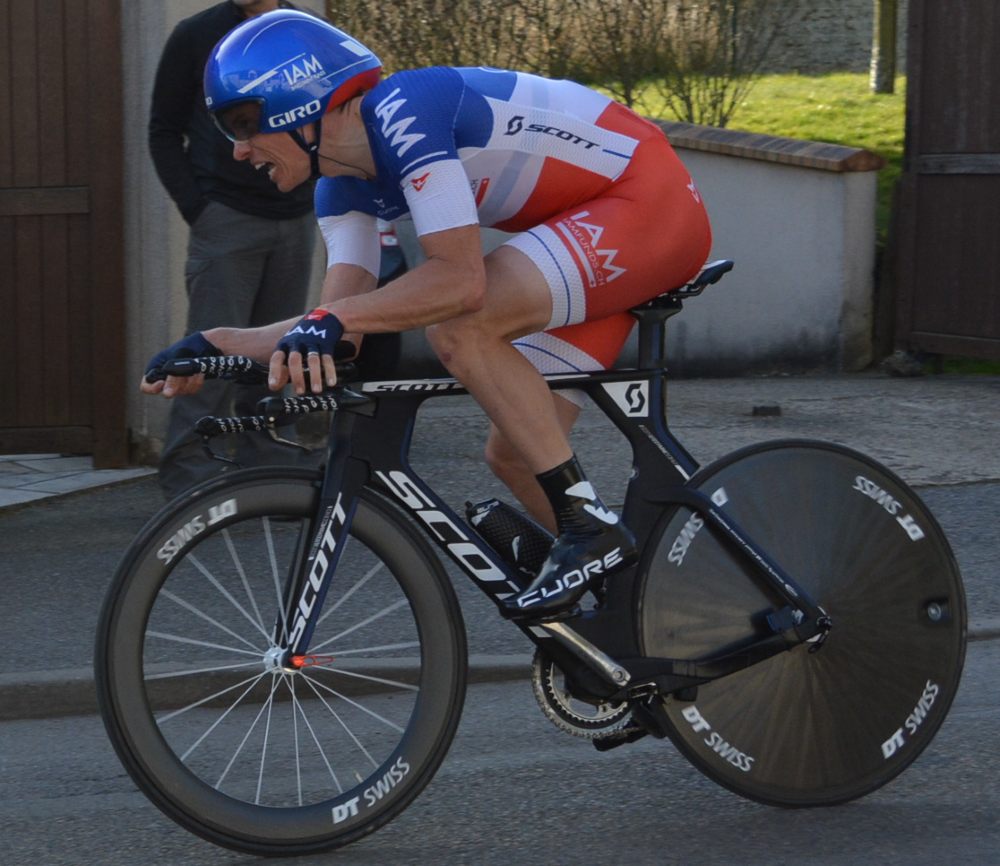
Sylvain Chavanel is the record winner of the men's French time trial championship, having taken six titles.

The French National Time Trial Championship is a road bicycle race that takes place inside the French National Cycling Championship, and decides the best cyclist in this type of race. The first edition took place in 1995. The first winner of the time trial championship was Thierry Marie. Jeannie Longo holds the record for the most wins with 11, and Sylvain Chavanel holds the record in the men's championship with 6. Bruno Armirail and Cédrine Kerbaol are the current champions.

== Multiple winners ==
=== Men ===
Wins	Name	Years
6	Sylvain Chavanel	2005, 2006, 2008, 2012, 2013, 2014
4	Eddy Seigneur	1996, 2002, 2003, 2004
3	Bruno Armirail	2022, 2024, 2025
3	Rémi Cavagna	2020, 2023, 2026
2	Francisque Teyssier	1997, 2000
2	Gilles Maignan	1998, 1999
2	Pierre Latour	2017, 2018
2	Benjamin Thomas	2019, 2021

=== Women ===
Wins	Name	Years
11	Jeannie Longo-Ciprelli	1995, 1999, 2000, 2001, 2002, 2003, 2006, 2008, 2009, 2010, 2011
6	Audrey Cordon-Ragot	2015, 2016, 2017, 2018, 2021, 2022
3	Pauline Ferrand-Prévot	2012, 2013, 2014
2	Edwige Pitel	2004, 2005
1	Cédrine Kerbaol	2025

== Men ==
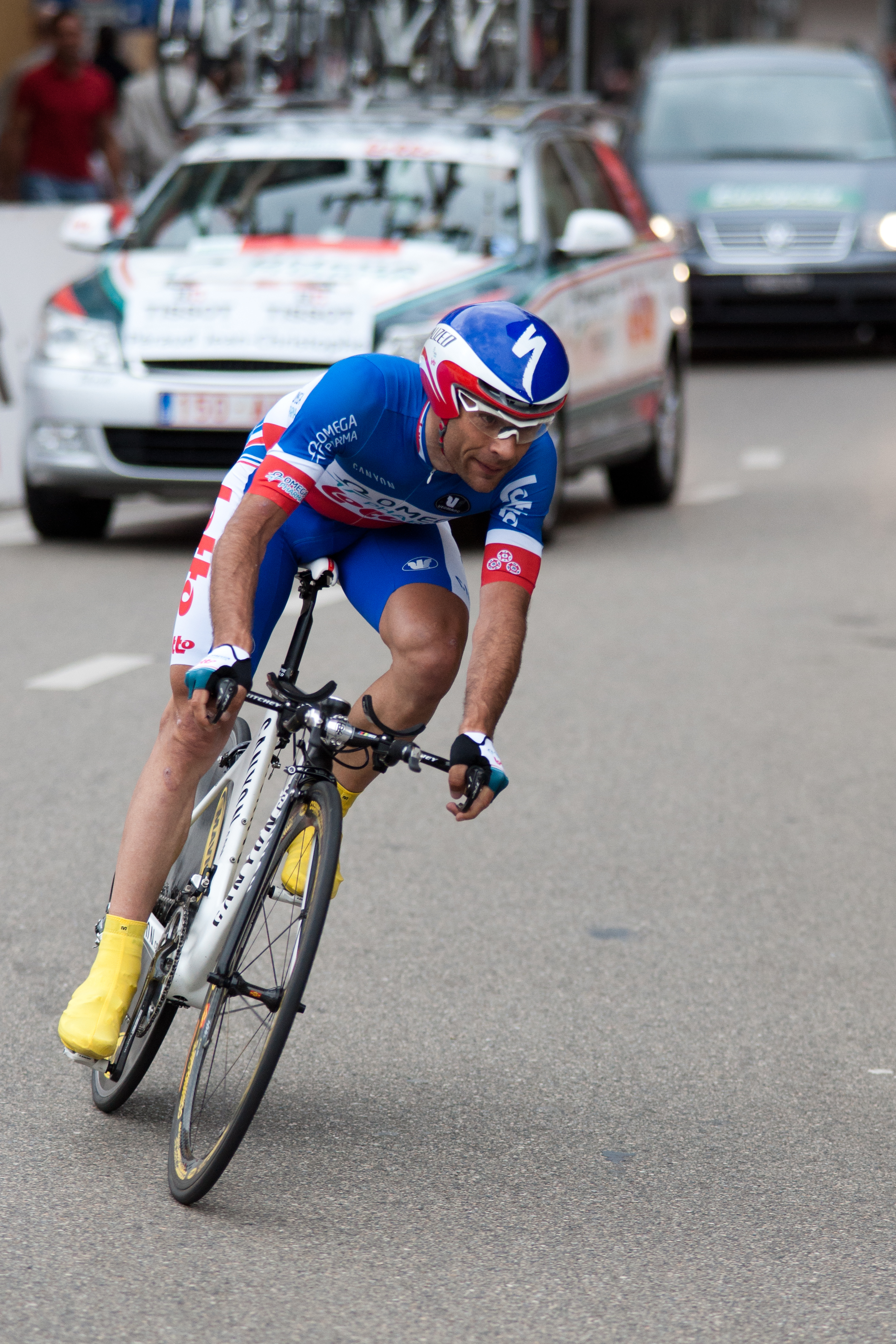
Jean-Christophe Peraud

=== Elite ===
Year	Gold	Silver	Bronze
1995	Thierry Marie	Pascal Lance	Bruno Thibout
1996	Eddy Seigneur	Laurent Brochard	Christophe Moreau
1997	Francisque Teyssier	Philippe Gaumont	Christophe Moreau
1998	Gilles Maignan	Francisque Teyssier	Christophe Bassons
1999	Gilles Maignan (2)	Christophe Moreau	Frédéric Finot
2000	Francisque Teyssier	Eddy Seigneur	Christophe Moreau
2001	Florent Brard	Christophe Moreau	Eddy Seigneur
2002	Eddy Seigneur (2)	David Moncoutié	Laurent Lefèvre
2003	Eddy Seigneur (3)	Stéphane Barthe	Nicolas Portal
2004	Eddy Seigneur (4)	Christophe Moreau	Frédéric Finot
2005	Sylvain Chavanel	Didier Rous	Frédéric Finot
2006	Sylvain Chavanel (2)	Didier Rous	Christophe Kern
2007	Benoît Vaugrenard	Dimitri Champion	Nicolas Vogondy
2008	Sylvain Chavanel (3)	Christophe Kern	Noan Lelarge
2009	Jean-Christophe Péraud	Sylvain Chavanel	David Lelay
2010	Nicolas Vogondy	Sylvain Chavanel	László Bodrogi
2011	Christophe Kern	Christophe Riblon	Geoffroy Lequatre
2012	Sylvain Chavanel (4)	Jérémy Roy	Yoann Paillot
2013	Sylvain Chavanel (5)	Jérémy Roy	Johan Le Bon
2014	Sylvain Chavanel (6)	Anthony Roux	Maxime Bouet
2015	Jérôme Coppel	Stéphane Rossetto	Sylvain Chavanel
2016	Thibaut Pinot	Anthony Roux	Tony Gallopin
2017	Pierre Latour	Yoann Paillot	Anthony Roux
2018	Pierre Latour (2)	Tony Gallopin	Benjamin Thomas
2019	Benjamin Thomas	Stéphane Rossetto	Julien Antomarchi
2020	Rémi Cavagna	Benjamin Thomas	Bruno Armirail
2021	Benjamin Thomas (2)	Bruno Armirail	Alexys Brunel
2022	Bruno Armirail	Rémi Cavagna	Benjamin Thomas
2023	Rémi Cavagna (2)	Bruno Armirail	Pierre Latour
2024	Bruno Armirail (2)	Kévin Vauquelin	Thibault Guernalec
2025	Bruno Armirail (3)	Kévin Vauquelin	Paul Seixas
2026	Rémi Cavagna (3)	Bruno Armirail	Ewen Costiou

=== U23 ===
Year	Gold	Silver	Bronze
1995	Christophe Bassons	Sébastien Nöel	Anthony Langella
1996	Cyril Dessel	Anthony Langella	Jérôme Bonnace
1997	Florent Brard	Stéphane Delimauges	Stéphane Bergès
1998	Florent Brard	Frédéric Finot	Fabrice Salanson
1999	Sandy Casar	Nicolas Fritsch	Sylvain Chavanel
2000	Yann Tournier	Christophe Edaleine	Eddy Lamoureux
2001	Christophe Kern	Yohann Charpenteau	Benoît Vaugrenard
2002	Damien Monier	Christophe Kern	Christophe Riblon
2003	Julien Mazet	Jonathan Ferrand	Damien Monier
2004	Florian Morizot	Dimitri Champion	Kilian Patour
2005	Dimitri Champion	Jérôme Coppel	Florian Morizot
2006	Jérôme Coppel	Florian Morizot	Sylvain Georges
2007	Jérôme Coppel	Tony Gallopin	Anthony Roux
2008	Tony Gallopin	Nicolas Boisson	Cyril Bessy
2009	Romain Lemarchand	Nicolas Bonnet	Geoffrey Soupe
2010	Nicolas Bonnet	Johan Le Bon	Matthieu Boulo
2011	Johan Le Bon	Yoann Paillot	Rudy Molard
2012	Johan Le Bon	Alexis Guérin	Kévin Labèque
2013	Yoann Paillot	Bruno Armirail	Alexis Gougeard
2014	Bruno Armirail	Rémi Cavagna	Nans Peters
2015	Rémi Cavagna	Marc Fournier	Nans Peters
2016	Rémi Cavagna	Corentin Ermenault	Thibault Guernalec
2017	Alexys Brunel	Thibault Guernalec	Corentin Ermenault
2018	Alexys Brunel	Jérémy Defaye	Thibault Guernalec
2019	Thibault Guernalec	Thomas Denis	Thomas Delphis
2020	Thomas Delphis	Quentin Bezza	Kévin Vauquelin
2021	Kévin Vauquelin	Enzo Paleni	Thomas Delphis
2022	Eddy Le Huitouze	Romain Grégoire	Pierre Thierry
2023	Eddy Le Huitouze	Baptiste Gillet	Pierre Thierry
2024	Maxime Decomble	Maximilian Cushway	Erwan Basnier
2025	Arthur Blaise	Maxime Decomble	Louis Chaleil
2026	Arthur Blaise	Louis Chaleil	Pierre Choblet

== Women ==
=== Elite ===
Year	Gold	Silver	Bronze
1995	Jeannie Longo-Ciprelli	Catherine Marsal	Cécile Odin
1996	Marion Clignet	Fanny Lecourtois	Chrystelle Richard
1997	Catherine Marsal	Emmanuelle Farcy	Laurence Leboucher
1998	Albine Caillié	Laurence Leboucher	Pierrine Raimboeuf
1999	Jeannie Longo-Ciprelli	Catherine Marsal	Géraldine Jehl-Loewenguth
2000	Jeannie Longo-Ciprelli	Albine Caillié	Marion Clignet
2001	Jeannie Longo-Ciprelli	Albine Caillié	Juliette Vandekerckhove
2002	Jeannie Longo-Ciprelli	Laurence Leboucher	Edwige Pitel
2003	Jeannie Longo-Ciprelli	Edwige Pitel	Sonia Huguet
2004	Edwige Pitel	Jeannie Longo-Ciprelli	Sonia Huguet
2005	Edwige Pitel	Jeannie Longo-Ciprelli	Marina Jaunâtre
2006	Jeannie Longo-Ciprelli	Edwige Pitel	Maryline Salvetat
2007	Maryline Salvetat	Jeannie Longo-Ciprelli	Edwige Pitel
2008	Jeannie Longo-Ciprelli	Maryline Salvetat	Edwige Pitel
2009	Jeannie Longo-Ciprelli	Edwige Pitel	Marina Jaunâtre
2010	Jeannie Longo-Ciprelli	Edwige Pitel	Christel Ferrier-Bruneau
2011	Jeannie Longo-Ciprelli	Christel Ferrier-Bruneau	Audrey Cordon
2012	Pauline Ferrand-Prévot	Audrey Cordon	Edwige Pitel
2013	Pauline Ferrand-Prévot	Audrey Cordon	Mélodie Lesueur
2014	Pauline Ferrand-Prévot	Audrey Cordon	Aude Biannic
2015	Audrey Cordon-Ragot	Aude Biannic	Pauline Ferrand-Prévot
2016	Audrey Cordon-Ragot	Edwige Pitel	Élise Delzenne
2017	Audrey Cordon-Ragot	Séverine Eraud	Aude Biannic
2018	Audrey Cordon-Ragot	Juliette Labous	Séverine Eraud
2019	Séverine Eraud	Audrey Cordon-Ragot	Coralie Demay
2020	Juliette Labous	Audrey Cordon-Ragot	Aude Biannic
2021	Audrey Cordon-Ragot	Juliette Labous	Cédrine Kerbaol
2022	Audrey Cordon-Ragot	Juliette Labous	Cédrine Kerbaol
2023	Cédrine Kerbaol	Audrey Cordon-Ragot	Coralie Demay
2024	Audrey Cordon-Ragot	Cédrine Kerbaol	Marion Borras
2025	Cédrine Kerbaol	Juliette Labous	Marion Borras
2026	Célia Le Mouël	Maëva Squiban	Cédrine Kerbaol

== See also ==
- French National Road Race Championships
- National Road Cycling Championships
