= Priska Doppmann =

Swiss cyclist (born 1971)

Personal information
- Full name: Priska Doppmann
- Born: 10 May 1971 (age 55) Cham, Switzerland
- Height: 1.70 m (5 ft 7 in)
- Weight: 55 kg (121 lb)

Cycling career
- Sport: Cycling
- Discipline: Road
- Role: Rider

Professional teams
- 1999: Gas Sport Team
- 2000: Master Carpe Diem
- 2001: Acca Due O–Lorena Camichi
- 2005–2006: Univega Pro Cycling Team
- 2007: Raleigh–Lifeforce Pro Cycling Team
- 2008: Cervélo Lifeforce Pro Cycling Team

Priska Doppmann (born 10 May 1971) is a Swiss road racing cyclist, born in Cham. She was the Swiss National Road Race champion in 1999. She finished 7th in the Women's road race at the 2008 Summer Olympics. Currently, she is a manager for the women's team Garmin–Cervélo.

== Major results ==
1999
1st Road Race, National Road Championships
2nd Rund Um die Rigi–Gersau
3rd GP Kanton Aargau Gippingen
7th Trofeo Alfredo Binda

2000
1st GP Kanton Aargau Gippingen
National Road Championships

2nd Time trial
3rd Road Race

5th Trofeo Alfredo Binda
7th La Flèche Wallonne

2001
National Road Championships

1st Time trial
2nd Road Race

1st Stage 4 Giro della Toscana Int. Femminile
10th UCI Road World Championships – Women's time trial

2002
1st Berner Rundfahrt
1st Rund Um die Rigi–Gersau
National Road Championships

2nd Road Race
3rd Time trial

3rd Overall Gracia–Orlová
3rd La Flèche Wallonne
3rd GP Suisse Féminin
5th Trofeo Alfredo Binda

2003
1st Time Trial, National Road Championships
3rd Overall Frauen Etappenrennen Albstadt

2004
1st GP des Nations
1st Rund Um die Rigi–Gersau
1st Stages 1, 2 & 4 Tour Cycliste Féminin de la Drôme
2nd Time Trial, National Road Championships
2nd Chrono Champenois – Trophée Européen
3rd Overall Giro d'Italia Femminile

1st Stage 5 (TTT)

8th UCI Road World Championships – Women's time trial
9th Time Trial, Olympic Games

2005
National Road Championships

1st Hill Climb
2nd Time Trial

1st Overall Grande Boucle Féminine Internationale

1st Stage 6

1st Overall Tour Cycliste Féminin de la Drôme

1st Stages 1, 2, 3a (TTT) & 5

2nd Chrono des Nations
3rd Rund Um die Rigi–Gersau

2006
1st Chrono des Nations
1st The Ladies Golden Hour
1st Stages 2 & 6 Tour de l'Aude Cycliste Féminin
2nd Overall Tour of New Zealand
2nd Souvenir Magali Pache
4th UCI Road World Championships – Women's time trial
5th Road Race, UCI Road World Championships

2007
National Road Championships

1st Hill Climb
2nd Time Trial

1st Stages 2 & 3a Grande Boucle Féminine Internationale
2nd Rund Um die Rigi–Gersau
3rd Chrono des Nations
6th UCI Road World Championships – Women's time trial

2008
1st Open de Suède Vårgårda TTT
1st Stage 5 Krasna Lipa Tour Féminine
1st Stage 2 Thüringen-Rundfahrt der Frauen
3rd Time Trial, National Road Championships
3rd Main-Spessart Rundfahrt
Olympic Games

7th Road Race
8th Time Trial
