= Liane Bahler =

German racing cyclist

Personal information
- Born: 22 January 1982 Gotha, Germany
- Died: 4 July 2007 (aged 25) Rudolstadt, Germany

Cycling career
- Sport: Cycling
- Discipline: Racing cyclist
- Role: Rider

Professional teams
- 2003-2005: Nürnberger Versicherung
- 2006: Therme Skin Care
- 2007: Fenix-HPB

Major wins
- 1st in the Köln-Hurth race (2006); 2nd in the Tour Cycliste Féminin de la Drôme (2004)

Liane Bahler (22 January 1982 – 4 July 2007) was a German professional racing cyclist.

== Biography ==
Bahler was born in Gotha, and started her professional career in 2001. In that year she finished third in the sixth stage of the Tour de Bretagne. In 2002, she won a stage in the Tour de l'Aude. She joined the Nürnberger Versicherung cycling team in 2003 and stayed with this team in 2004 and 2005. In 2004, she finished in second place in the Albstadt Frauen Etappenrennen. She made a move to Dutch team Therme Skin Care in 2006. She finished in second position at the Tour Cycliste Féminin de la Drôme, and third in the fourth stage of the Route de France Féminine. She also won the Köln-Hurth race that year. For the 2007 season she switched to Italian team Fenix-HPB.

On 4 July 2007, Bahler died in a car crash in Rudolstadt, while travelling to the airport on the way to competing in the Giro d'Italia Femminile.
