= Ceris Gilfillan =

British cyclist

Ceris Styler (née Gilfillan) (born 3 January 1980) is a British racing cyclist who represented Great Britain at the 2000 Summer Olympics, where she placed 14th in the women's road time trial and 27th in the road race. She was both British National Road Race Champion and British National Time Trial Champion in 2000, and came fifth in the time trial at the 2000 UCI Road World Championships. She won a bronze medal in the time trial at the 1999 European Road Championships.

In 2010, Styler and her brother (James Gilfillan) competed at the ITU Duathlon World Championships in Edinburgh. Styler placed second in the women's 30-34 age category.

Styler won the Masters World Cyclocross championships, age 40-44 in 2021 and 2022.

== Major results ==
2000
5th UCI Road World Championships – Women's time trial
