= Rasa Polikevičiūtė =

Lithuanian cyclist

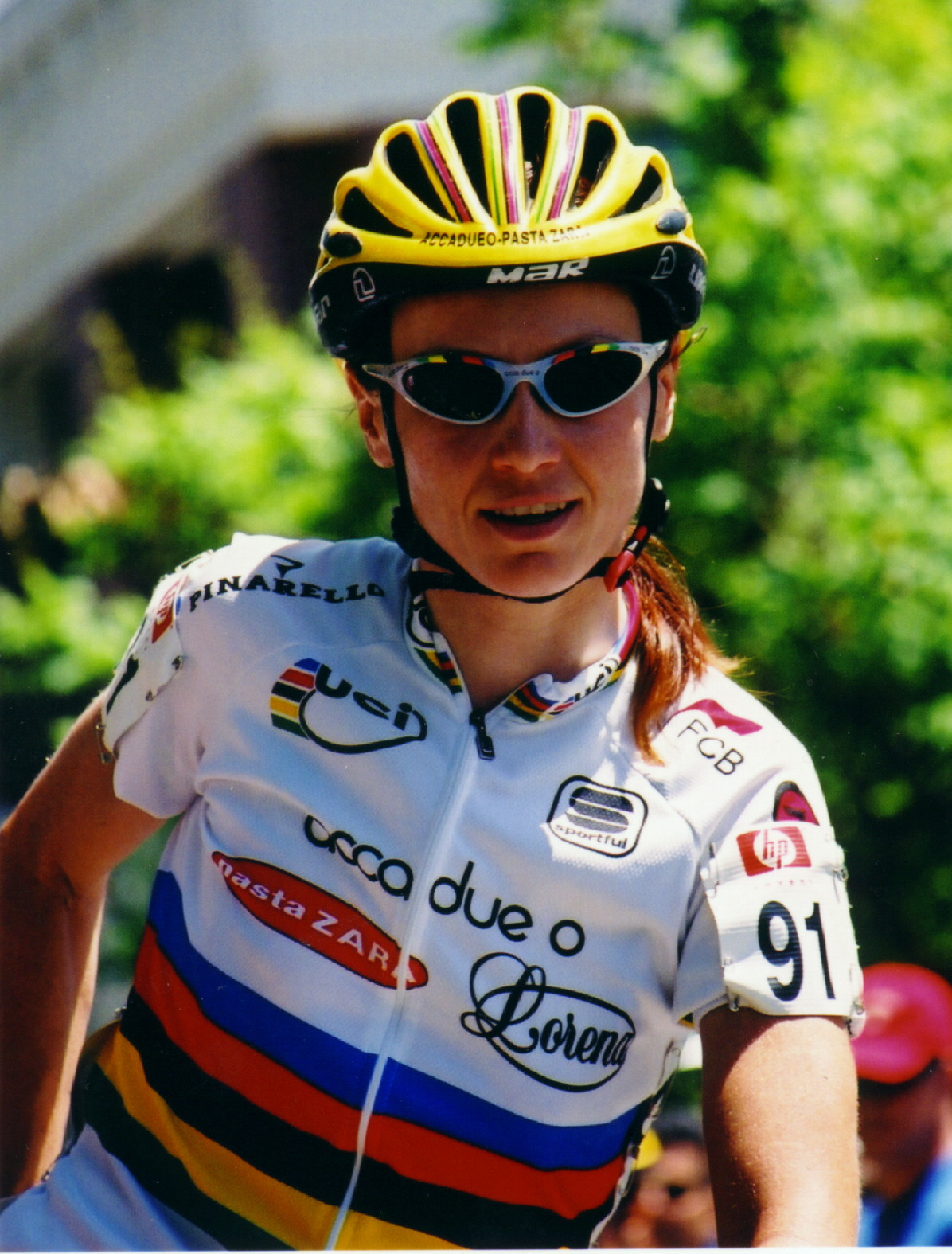
- Rasa Polikevičiūtė during the introductions prior to one of the stages of the 2002 Women's Challenge stage race. She is wearing the Rainbow Jersey which signifies that she was the (then) current World Road Race Champion.

Personal information
- Full name: Rasa Polikevičiūtė
- Born: September 25, 1970 (age 56) Panevėžys, Lithuanian SSR, Soviet Union

Cycling career
- Sport: Cycling
- Discipline: Road
- Role: Rider

Professional teams
- 1999: Entente Panevezys-Casteljaloux
- 2000–2002: Acca Due O
- 2003: Team 2002 Aurora RSM
- 2004: USC Chirio Forno d'Asolo
- 2005: Team Bianchi-Aliverti
- 2007–2008: USC Chirio Forno D'Asolo
Medal record
Representing Lithuania
Women's road cycling
World Championships
Gold medal – first place	2001	Women's Road Race
Silver medal – second place	1994	Women's Team Time Trial
Silver medal – second place	1996	Women's Road Race
Bronze medal – third place	2000	Women's Time Trial

Rasa Polikevičiūtė (born September 25, 1970 in Panevėžys) is a Lithuanian cycle racer.

She began cycling at age 13 under the influence of her childhood athletic coach and made her professional debut in 1990. In 1997, she won the Women's Challenge bicycle race and later went on to win the 2001 World Road Race Championships.

== Major results ==
1993
3rd GP de la Mutualite Haute Garonne
Tour de l'Aude Cycliste Féminin - stage victory
1st Berlin Rundfahrt

2 stage victories

1st Druzhba

stage victory

2nd Velka Cena Presova

stage victory

1994
2nd World Team Time Trial Championships
1st GP Kanton Zurich

1 stage victory

2nd Masters Feminin

1 stage victory

2nd Tour Cycliste Feminin

2 stage victories

2nd Tour de l'Aude Cycliste Féminin
1995
1st Lithuanian Road Race Championships
1st Lithuanian Time Trial Championships
3rd Etoile Vosgienne

1 stage victory

2nd Tour de l'Aude Cycliste Féminin

1 stage victory

Vuelta a Mallorca - stage victory
1996
2nd World Road Race Championships
1st Masters Feminin
2ndTour Cycliste Feminin
2nd GP Presova
1997
2nd Krasna Lipa

stage victory

Haute Garonne - stage victory
2nd Tour du Finistere

1 stage victory

3rd Trophee d'Or

1 stage victory

2nd Liberty Classic
1st Women's Challenge

stage victory

4th Tour de l'Aude Cycliste Féminin
1998
4th World Road Race Championships
7th Trophee International World Cup
5th Women's Challenge
Vuelta a Majorca - stage victory
4th Haute Garonne
1999
5th Tour de Suisse Feminin

stage victory

3rd Thüringen-Rundfahrt

QOM jersey

2000
3rd UCI Road World Championships – Women's time trial
2nd Tour de Suisse Feminin

QOM jersey
1 stage victory

Grande Boucle - stage victory
2001
7th UCI Points List
1st World Road Race Championships
4th UCI Road World Championships – Women's time trial
3rd Giro della Toscana
5th Grande Boucle Féminine
5th Thüringen-Rundfahrt
3rd Women's Challenge
2002
8th UCI Road World Championships – Women's time trial
Grande Boucle Féminine (2.9.1) - 1 stage victory
5th Giro d'Italia Femminile
2003
5th Giro del Trentino

1 stage victory

5th Giro d'Italia Femminile

1 stage victory

Grande Boucle - stage victory

== Personal life ==
Polikevičiūtė has an identical twin, Jolanta Polikevičiūtė, who is also a racer.

Awards
Preceded by (Lithuania) Virgilijus Alekna	Best Lithuanian sportsman of the Year; 1998	Succeeded by (Lithuania) Raimondas Rumšas
