= 2000 UCI Road World Championships – Women's time trial =

Women's time trial
2000 UCI Road World Championships
- Rainbow jersey

Race details
- Dates: 11 October 2000 in Plouay, France
- Stages: 1
- Distance: 24.5 km (15.2 mi)
- Winning time: 33' 14"

Medalists
	Gold	Mari Holden (USA)
	Silver	Jeannie Longo (FRA)
	Bronze	Rasa Polikevičiūtė (LTU)

The Women's time trial at the 2000 UCI Road World Championships took place over a distance of 24.5 kilometres (15.2 miles) in Plouay, France on 11 October 2000.

== Final classification ==
Rank	Rider	Country	Time
1st place, gold medalist(s)	Mari Holden	United States	33' 14"
2nd place, silver medalist(s)	Jeannie Longo	France	+ 3"
3rd place, bronze medalist(s)	Rasa Polikevičiūtė	Lithuania	+ 46"
4	Solrun Flataas	Norway	+ 54"
5	Ceris Gilfillan	United Kingdom	+ 57"
6	Hanka Kupfernagel	Germany	+ 59"
7	Albine Caillie	France	+ 1' 16"
8	Zinaida Stahurskaia	Belarus	+ 1' 28"
9	Judith Arndt	Germany	+ 1' 38"
10	Mariëlle van Scheppingen	Netherlands	+ 1' 50"
11	Tracey Gaudry	Australia	+ 1' 56"
12	Anne Samplonius	Canada	+ 1' 57"
13	Sara Carrigan	Australia	+ 1' 59"
14	Gabriella Pregnolato	Italy	+ 2' 00"
15	Susanne Ljungskog	Sweden	+ 2' 04"
16	Ruth Martinez	Spain	+ 2' 11"
17	Wenche Stensvold	Norway	+ 2' 12"
18	Bogumiła Matusiak	Poland	+ 2' 18"
19	Sarah Symington	United Kingdom	+ 2' 25"
20	Nicole Brändli	Switzerland	+ 2' 33"
21	Deirdre Demet-Barry	United States	+ 2' 36"
22	Monika Tyburska	Poland	+ 2' 41"
23	Diana Rast	Switzerland	+ 2' 41"
24	Lisbeth Simper	Denmark	+ 3' 16"
25	Luisa Tamanini	Italy	+ 3' 20"
26	Geraldine Gill	Ireland	+ 3' 43"
27	Agnes Kay Eppers	Bolivia	+ 6' 34"
28	Fatma Galiulina	Uzbekistan	+ 6' 51"
DNF	Sandy Espeseth	Canada	-
DNS	Jenny Algelid	Sweden	-
DNS	Jolanta Polikevičiūtė	Lithuania	-
