= Deborah Shumway =

American cyclist (1955–2022)

Deborah Shumway (February 21, 1955 – May 7, 2022) was an American cycle racer who placed third in the general classification in the first Tour de France Féminin in 1984, which teammate Marianne Martin won. She competed in the race again the following year.

Shumway also featured in the 1988 movie Wheels in Motion, playing a cyclist who hopes to compete at the Olympics.

== Personal life ==
Shumway lived in Ignacio, Colorado with her husband, former mountain bike racer Greg Herbold, winner of the downhill mountain biking event at the first mountain bike world championships in 1990. Shumway died on May 7, 2022.
