= Mari Holden =

American Olympic and World Champion cyclist

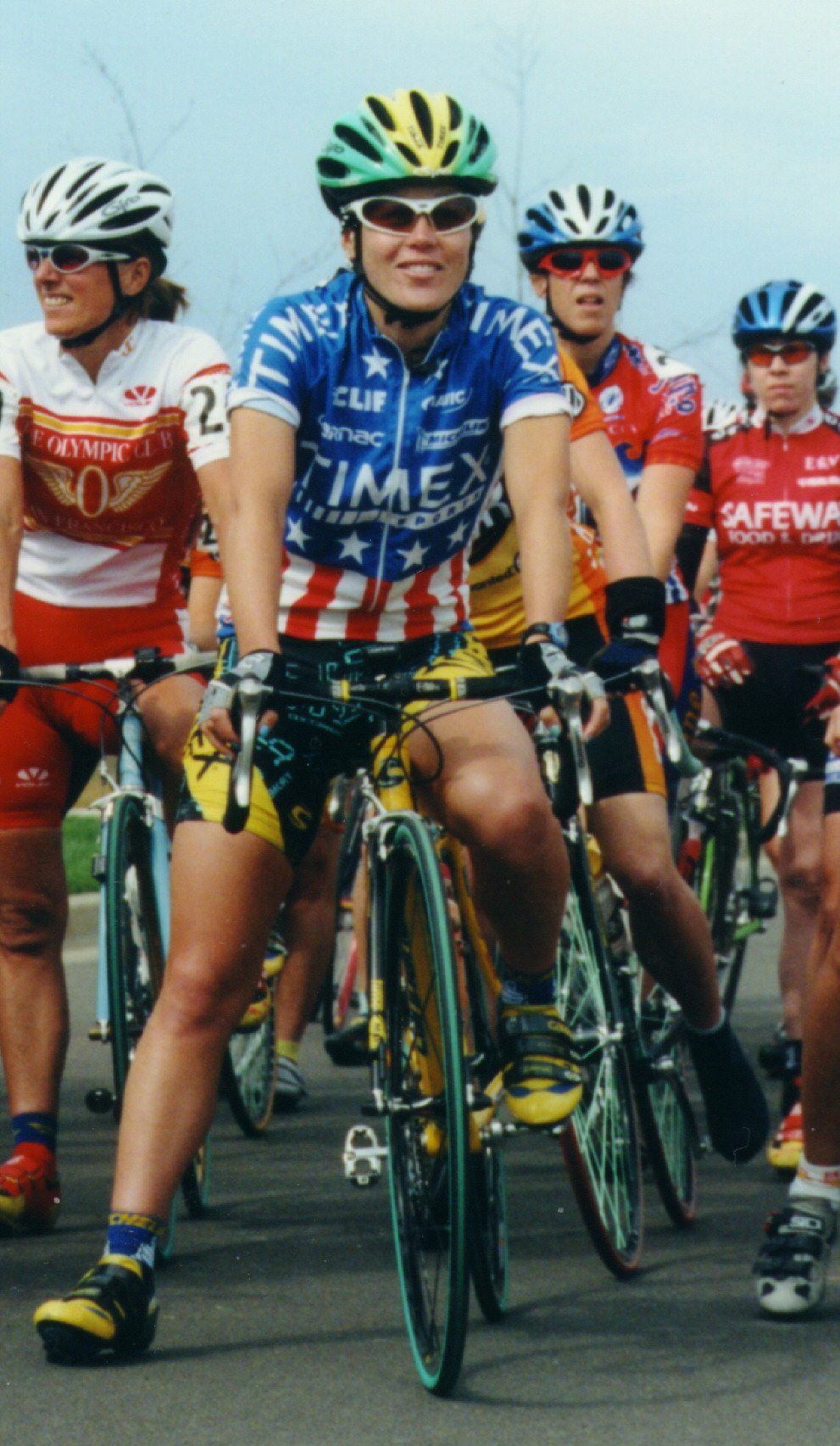
- Holden in 2000

Personal information
- Full name: Mari Kim Holden
- Born: March 30, 1971 (age 55) Milwaukee, Wisconsin, United States

Cycling career
- Sport: Cycling
- Current team: Virginia's Blue Ridge–Twenty28
- Discipline: Road
- Role: Rider (retired); Directeur sportif
- Rider type: Time trialist

Amateur teams
- 1994–1996: Timex
- 1997: Euregio Egrensis
- 1998: Greenery–Hawk
- 1998: Saeco–Timex

Professional teams
- 1999: Acca Due O–Lorena Camicie
- 2000: Timex
- 2001: Alfa Lum
- 2002: Cannondale USA
- 2003–2006: Team T-Mobile

Managerial team
- 2014–: Twenty16
Medal record
Representing United States
Women's Road bicycle racing
Olympic Games
Silver medal – second place	2000 Sydney	Road time trial
World Championships
Gold medal – first place	2000 Plouay	Time trial

Mari Kim Holden (born March 30, 1971) is an American Olympic medalist and World Champion in the sport of cycling. She won a silver medal in the 2000 Olympic Games time trial in Sydney, Australia and the world time trial championship later that year. She also won six U.S. championships, becoming the first American woman to win three consecutive U.S. time trial championships (1998–2000) and scoring a double by winning the U.S. time trial and road championships in 1999. In 2016 she was inducted into the U.S. Bicycling Hall of Fame as a Modern Road and Track Competitor and presently works as a community director at USA Cycling.

== Career ==
Born in Milwaukee, Wisconsin, Holden was a two-time member of the U.S. junior world triathlon team, and was named junior triathlete of the year in 1991 by the Triathlon Federation USA. That year she finished seventh in the junior triathlon world championship.

She began cycling with a club in high school as part of a fitness program centered on triathlon, and did not make competitive cycling her focus until 1992 when she moved to Colorado Springs and began training with the U.S. cycling team to improve her triathlon. She also transferred to University of Colorado at Colorado Springs, where she majored in philosophy.

After finishing sixth in the national time trial championship in 1993, Holden sat out much of 1994 with a compression fracture in her back. She came back the following two years, winning the time trial championship in 1995 and 1996.

The 1996 event was part of the trial to select members of the Olympic team. Selection was on overall performance in time trials and road races, and although Holden won both time trials, she did not fare so well in the road race and failed to qualify.

Holden raced in Europe. In 1999, she finished second in the Women's Challenge against an international field and in the top 10 in the Grande Boucle.

The following year, she won a silver medal at the Olympics, followed by a victory two weeks later in the world time trial championship in Plouay, France.

That year (2000), Holden was elected to the board of directors of USA Cycling and re-elected in 2004. She formerly served on the athletic advisory committee to the U.S. Olympic Committee and was athlete ambassador to the U.S. Anti-Doping Agency.

Holden coaches and holds cycling clinics and cycling camps as well as serves as a consultant on women's cycling issues and products. She was called one of the "greatest ambassadors in the sport of cycling" by Ride Magazine (March, 2008).

She joined the staff of USA Cycling in 2019 and is a community director, leading Let's Ride, a nationwide youth cycling program.

== Career achievements ==
=== Major results ===
1991
7th ITU Junior World Triathlon Championships

1995
1st Time trial, National Road Championships
1st John Stenner Memorial time trial
1st Louisville Criterium
1st Point Mogu Criterium
3rd Overall Women's Challenge

1 stage win

3rd Redlands Bicycle Classic
National record — 40-kilometre (25-mile) time trial: 51 minutes, 36.24 seconds

1996
1st Time trial, National Road Championships (US Olympic Trials Time Trial #2)
1st Overall 89er stage race

2 stage wins

1st US Olympic Trials Time Trial #1
Bohemia Crystal Tour

2 stage wins

2nd Overall Tour of Tucson

1 stage win

2nd Can/Pro Cycling Series

1997
1st Overall Red River Classic Stage Race
1st Meridian Bicycle Classic
National Road Championships

2nd Road race
2nd Time trial

7th UCI Road World Championships – Women's time trial

1998
1st Time trial, National Road Championships
1st Overall Street Skills Stage Race

1 stage win

1st Overall Redlands Bicycle Classic
1st Mountains classification Women's Challenge
2nd Vuelta International a Majorca Feminas
3rd Grand Prix des Nations
7th UCI Road World Championships – Women's time trial

1999
National Road Championships

1st Road race
1st Time trial

2nd Overall Women's Challenge

1st Mountains classification
1st Stage 3

2nd Trofeo Alfredo Binda-Comune di Cittiglio
4th Overall Street Skills Stage Race
7th Overall Tour de Snowy

1st Stage 2 (ITT)

8th Overall Grande Boucle Féminine Internationale
8th La Flèche Wallonne Féminine

2000 – Timex
1st UCI Road World Championships – Women's time trial
1st Time trial, National Road Championships
1st Overall Tour of the Gila
1st Overall Tour of Willamette

1st Stages 3 & 4 (ITT)

1st Mountains classification Thüringen Rundfahrt der Frauen
2nd Time trial, Olympic Games
2nd Overall Sea Otter Classic
4th Overall Tour de Snowy

2001
1st Mountains classification Giro d'Italia Femminile
2nd Time trial, National Road Championships
6th New Zealand World Cup
6th UCI Road World Championships – Women's time trial

2002
8th Australia World Cup

2004
1st New York City Invitational

=== Awards ===
- 1991: United States Junior Triathlete of the Year

== Personal ==
Her last name was Holden-Paulsen while married as a young adult.
