= Christophe Kern =

French road bicycle racer

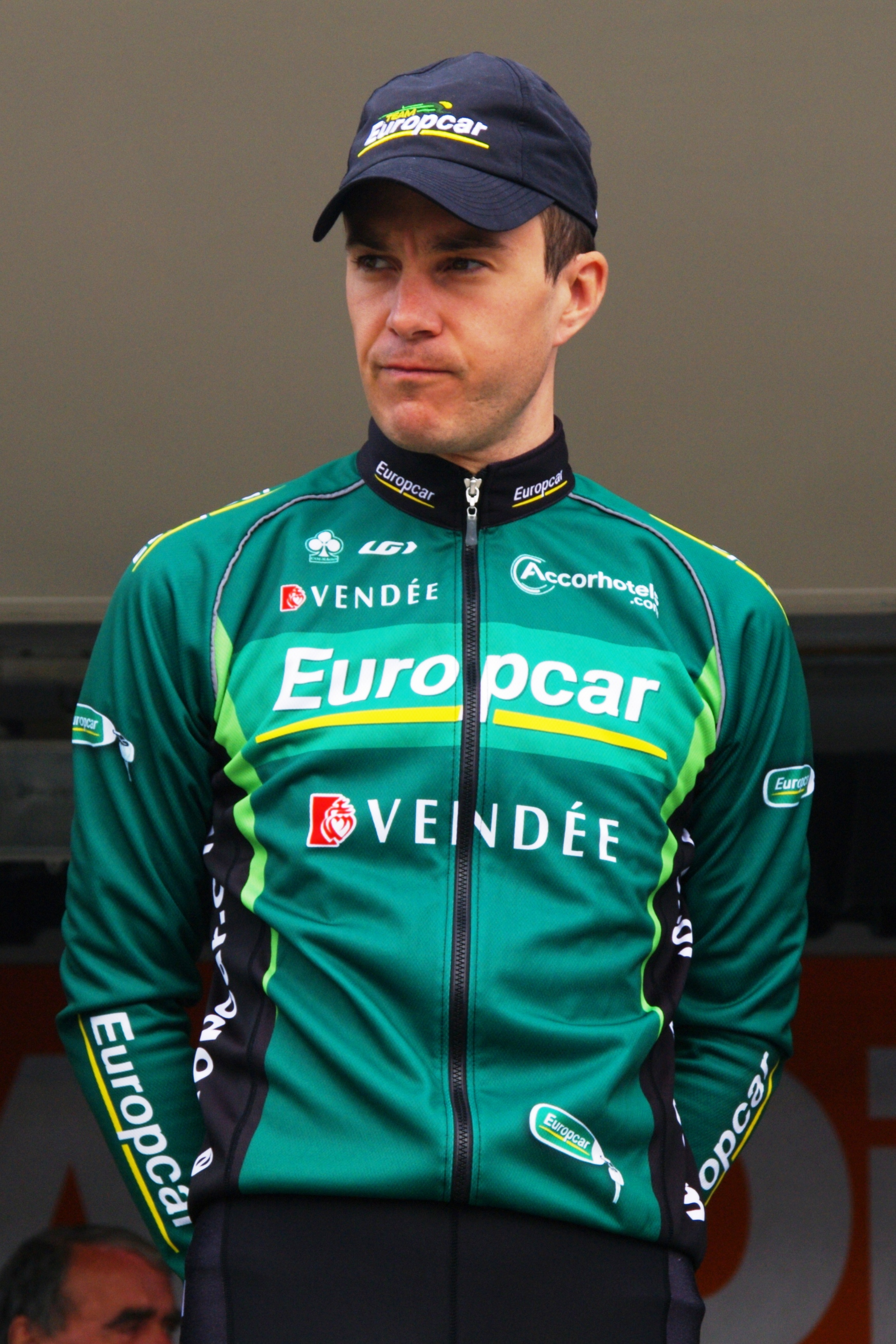
- Kern at the 2011 Grand Prix de Denain

Personal information
- Full name: Christophe Kern
- Born: 18 January 1981 (age 45) Wissembourg, France
- Height: 1.85 m (6 ft 1 in)
- Weight: 72 kg (159 lb)

Cycling career
- Sport: Cycling
- Current team: Retired
- Discipline: Road
- Role: Rider
- Rider type: Rouleur

Amateur teams
- 2000: Française des Jeux (stagiaire)
- 2001–2002: Vendée U–Pays de la Loire
- 2001: Bonjour (stagiaire)

Professional teams
- 2003–2006: Brioches La Boulangère
- 2007–2008: Crédit Agricole
- 2009–2010: Cofidis
- 2011–2014: Team Europcar

Christophe Kern (born 18 January 1981 in Wissembourg, Bas-Rhin) is a French former road racing cyclist, who rode professionally between 2003 and 2014 for the Crédit Agricole, Cofidis and Team Europcar teams.

== Major results ==
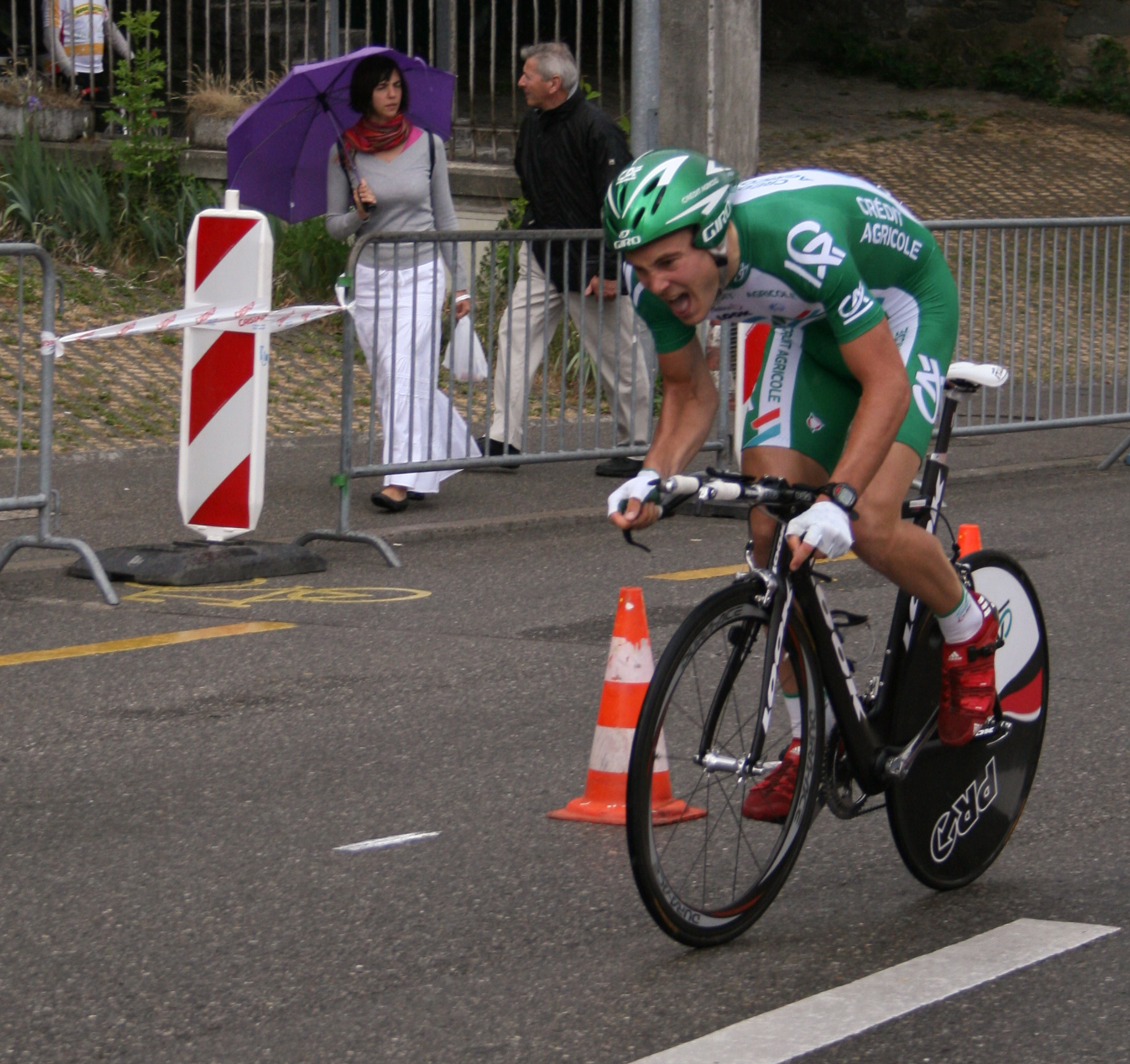
Kern at the 2007 Tour de Romandie

1999
3rd Road race, UCI Junior Road World Championships
2001
8th Overall Circuit Franco-Belge
2002
1st Liège–Bastogne–Liège U23
10th Paris–Mantes-en-Yvelines
2003
1st Grand Prix Rudy Dhaenens
5th Grand Prix de la Ville de Lillers
2004
1st Stage 6 Tour de l'Avenir
2006
3rd Time trial, National Road Championships
2008
2nd Time trial, National Road Championships
2nd Tour du Doubs
2009
7th Duo Normand (with Julien Fouchard)
2010
10th Overall Tour of Turkey

1st Turkish Beauties classification

2011
1st Time trial, National Road Championships
6th Overall Critérium du Dauphiné

1st Stage 5

2014
1st Combativity classification Tour du Limousin

=== Grand Tour general classification results timeline ===
Grand Tour	2005	2006	2007	2008	2009	2010	2011	2012
Giro d'Italia	DNF	—	114	—	—	—	—	—
Tour de France	—	—	—	—	75	97	DNF	83
Vuelta a España	DNF	DNF	84	112	—	—	—	—

Legend
—	Did not compete
DNF	Did not finish
