= Marianne Martin =

American racing cyclist (born 1957)

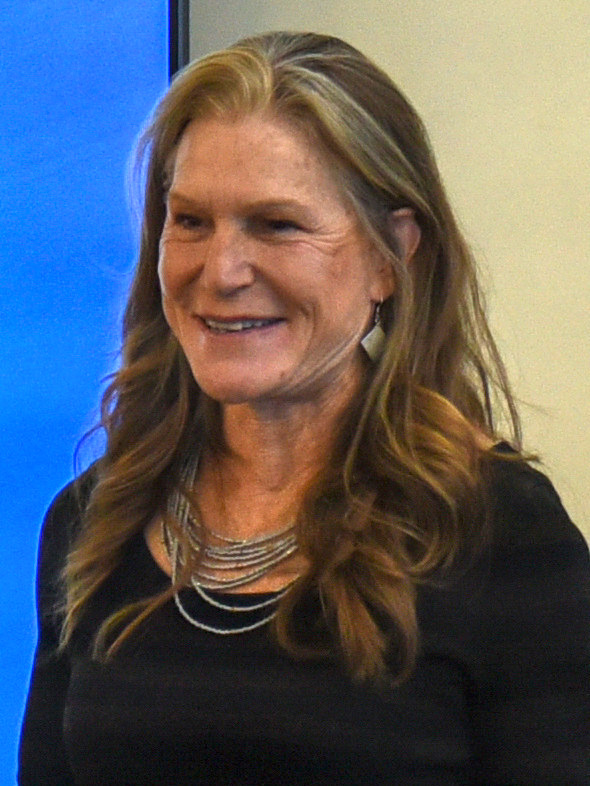
Martin in 2025

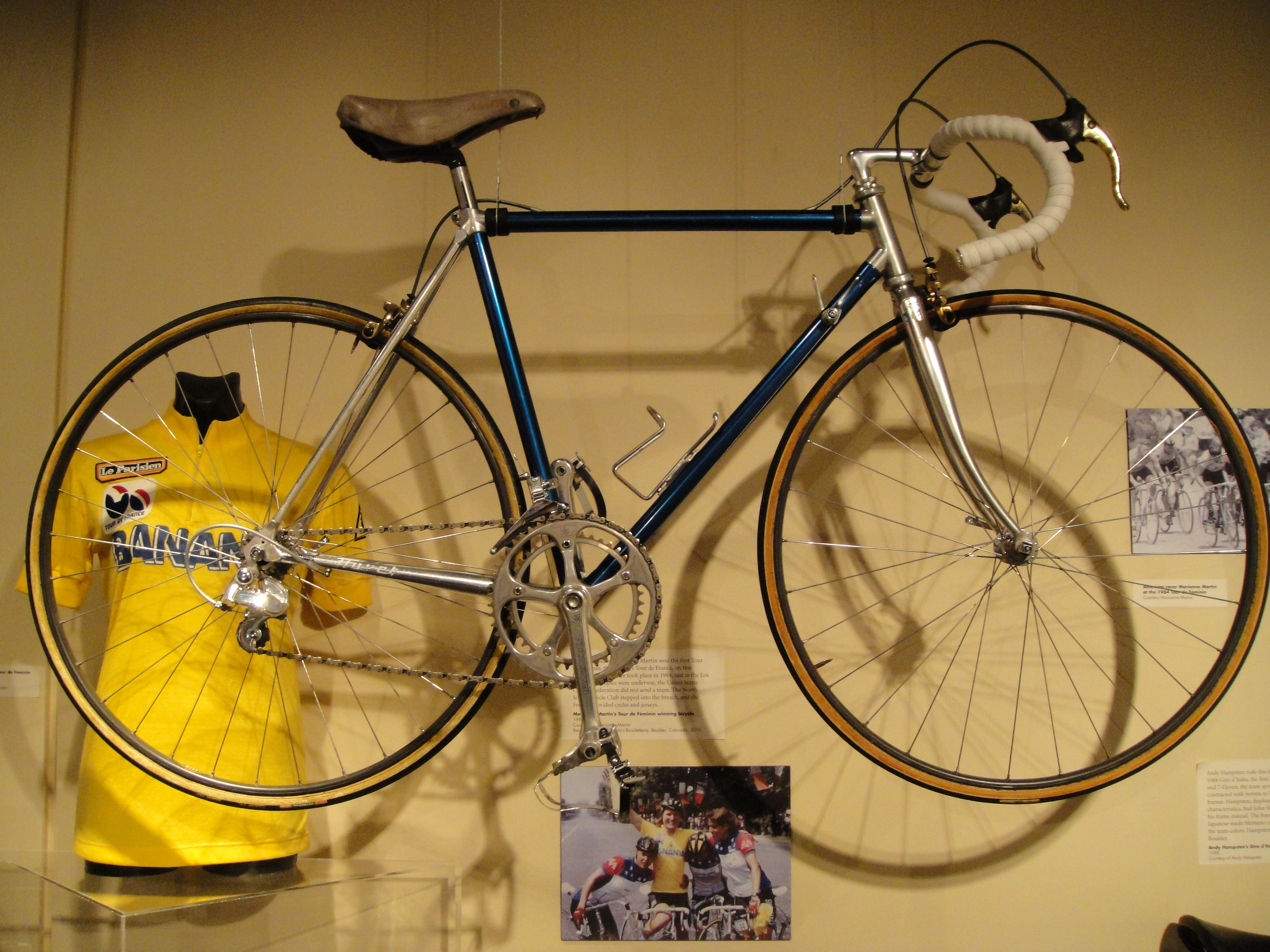
The bicycle ridden by Marianne Martin in the 1984 Tour de France Féminin

Marianne Martin (born November 1, 1957, in Fenton, Michigan) is an American road racing cyclist. She won the Tour de France Féminin for women in 1984, becoming the first American to do so. The race covered 1,080-kilometre (670 mi) which she completed in 29 hours, 39 minutes, and 2 seconds. The race was held in July and had 18 stages. The women's tour ran the same time as the men's and finished 2–3 hours before the men each day.

The year she won the Tour de France Martin suffered from anemia earlier in that year and had been riding poorly. After recovering, Martin was added to the United States team by National Team Coach Eddie Borysewicz. At the time when she was selected to be on the team, Martin was trying to qualify for the U.S. Olympic cycling team, and completed three out of four Olympic trial races before leaving for France the next day. Martin was not expected to finish the race, and did not specifically train for the tour prior to being selected. Martin earned the Queen of the Mountains polka-dot jersey in the 12th stage that went over two passes in the Alps and finished in Grenoble. She took the yellow jersey (maillot jaune) of the overall lead in the general classification (GC) in stage 14. She held on to the yellow jersey all the way through the 18th and final stage into Paris, finishing three minutes and 17 seconds ahead of the second-place finisher, and leading the United States to a first place finish in the team competition ahead of the Netherlands and France. The streets were said to contain more two million spectators watching the race.

Martin, along with runners up Heleen Hage (Dutch) and Deborah Shumway (American), stood on the podium with male champions Laurent Fignon, Bernard Hinault and Greg LeMond. Fignon's prizes were valued at over $225,000 (adjusted to 2016). Martin was awarded a trophy and $1,000. According to Martin, the male riders received better room and board accommodation as well as better meals.

Martin was inducted into the 2012 Boulder (Colorado) Sports Hall of Fame. She was a 2020 inductee to the US Bicycling Hall of Fame.

During the 2022 Tour de France Femmes, Martin commented on the importance of the event in inspiring other women: "And I didn't even think about it until I'm saying this right now. But that's the big thing about having the women's Tour, is that other women can see women racing and they can visualize themselves doing it."

On October 6, 2024, Marianne crashed her bike while descending Sunshine Canyon, hospitalizing her. She spent multiple days in the ICU, and the local biking community raised $11,000 via GoFundMe to help pay for her medical bills.
