= Zulfiya Zabirova =

Russian cyclist

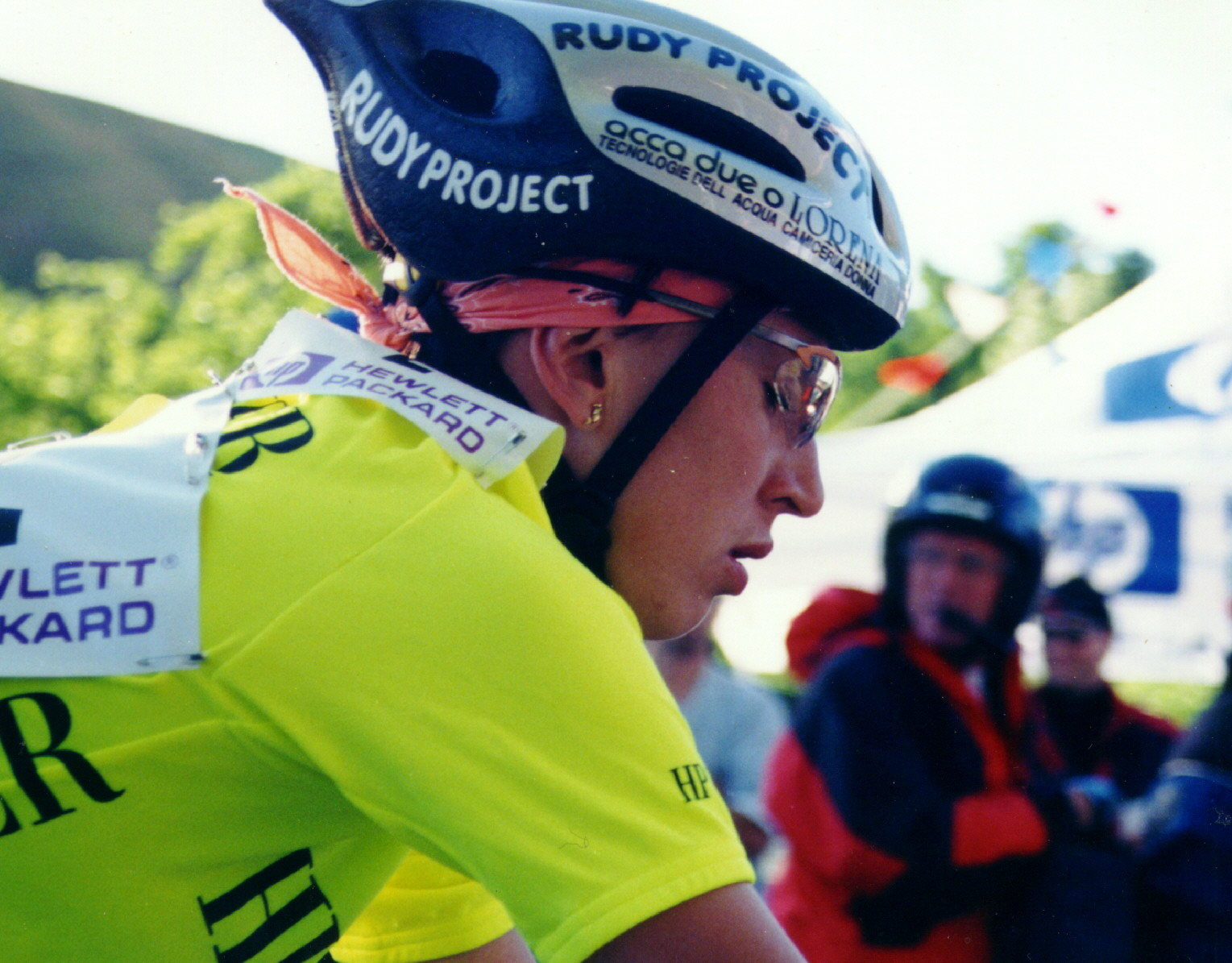
- Zabirova prior to her start in the time trial at the 1998 Women's Challenge

Personal information
- Full name: Zulfiya Zabirova
- Born: 19 December 1973 (age 52) Tashkent, Uzbek SSR, Soviet Union
- Height: 5 ft 10 in (1.78 m)
- Weight: 143 lb (65 kg)

Cycling career
- Sport: Cycling
- Discipline: Road
- Role: Rider

Professional teams
- 1999: Acca Due O
- 2000–2001: Acca Due O–Lorena Camichie
- 2002: USC Chirio
- 2003: Team Prato Marathon Bike
- 2004: Team Let's Go Finland
- 2005–2008: Bigla Cycling Team
Medal record
Representing Russia
Women's road cycling
Olympic Games
Gold medal – first place	1996 Atlanta	Individual Time Trial
UCI Road World Championships
Gold medal – first place	2002 Zolder/Hasselt	Time trial
Silver medal – second place	1997 San Sebastián	Time trial
Silver medal – second place	1998 Valkenburg	Time trial
Bronze medal – third place	2003 Hamilton	Time trial
Bronze medal – third place	2004 Verona	Time trial

Zulfiya Khasanovna Zabirova (Зульфия Хасановна Забирова; born 19 December 1973) is a Russian professional cycle racer who won the gold medal in the time trial event in the 1996 Olympics and later, in 2002, won the World Time Trial Championship.

Zabirova is one of two riders to have won two cycling monuments in the same year, having won the Primavera Rosa and Tour of Flanders for Women in 2004.

== Biography ==
Zulfiya was born in Tashkent, Uzbekistan on 19 December 1973. She is an ethnic Uzbek. In 1993 two years after the breakup of the Soviet Union she emigrated to Russia and lived in Rostov-on-Don. As the main reason for her emigration she cited that the Islamist leadership of the newly independent Uzbekistan is hostile to the women sports and the rights of women in general. In 1996 she became famous after winning the Olympic gold medal in Atlanta.

In 2005, she obtained the citizenship of Kazakhstan and announced her intention to compete as a member of the Kazakhstan team. As the reason for her decision she cited the better conditions for training and her desire to be closer to her native Uzbekistan (Kazakhstan has a reputation to be much more secular and democratic than Uzbekistan) as well as her family circumstances. According to the Russian Newspaper Komsomolskaya Pravda, Zabirova's main place of residence and training is Lugano, Switzerland (as of 2005).

== Major results ==
1994
3rd UCI Junior Track Cycling World Championships (Individual pursuit)

1995
2nd National Road Championships, Time Trial
8th UCI Road World Championships – Women's time trial

1996
1st Olympic Games Time Trial
National Road Championships

1st Time Trial
2nd Road Race

1st GP Kanton Zurich
Tour Cycliste Feminin

Two Stage wins

3rd Tour du Finistère
4th UCI Road World Championships – Women's time trial

1997
1st National Road Championships, Road Race
1st Overall Étoile Vosgienne

One stage win

1st Overall Trois Jours de Vendée

One stage win

1st Chrono des Herbiers
1st Tour du Finistère
Tour Cycliste Feminin

Two Stage wins

2nd UCI Road World Championships – Women's time trial
2nd Chrono Champenois
2nd GP des Nations
2nd Thrift Drug Classic
3rd Overall Women's Challenge

Two stage wins

3rd Overall Gracia–Orlová

1998
1st GP Suisse Féminin
1st GP des Nations
1st Josef Voegeli Memorial
Tour Cycliste Feminin

One stage win

2nd UCI Road World Championships – Women's time trial
4th Overall Thuringen Rundfahrt der Frauen

1999
1st Overall Tour de Suisse Feminin

1st One stage win

3rd Overall Women's Challenge

One stage win

4th UCI Road World Championships – Women's time trial
5th Overall Giro d'Italia Femminile

1st Stages 4, 7, & 9

2000
1st National Road Championships, Time Trial
1st Overall Tour de Suisse Feminin

One stage win

5th Overall Grande Boucle

1st Stage 9 & 13

7th Olympic Games Road Race

2002
1st UCI Road World Championships – Women's time trial
1st Overall Thuringen Rundfahrt der Frauen

One stage win

1st GP Carnevale d'Europa
1st Chrono Champenois-Trophee Europeen
Grande Boucle

Two stage wins

1st Stage 4 Giro della Toscana
7th Overall Giro d'Italia Femminile
9th GP Suisse

2003
1st Overall Vuelta Castilla y Leon

1st Stages 2 & 3

1st Primavera Rosa
Grande Boucle

Two stage wins

3rd UCI Road World Championships – Women's time trial
4th Overall Trophée d'Or Féminin

2004
3rd UCI Road World Championships – Women's time trial
1st Tour of Flanders
1st Primavera Rosa
1st Overall Thuringen Rundfahrt der Frauen

1st Stage 5

8th Olympic Games, Time Trial
10th Overall Giro d'Italia Femminile

1st Stage 5

2005
National Road Championships

1st Time Trial
1st Road Race

1st Prologue Giro di San Marino
1st Stage 4 Giro d'Italia Femminile
6th UCI Road World Championships – Women's time trial

2006
National Road Championships

1st Time Trial
1st Road Race

1st Overall Trophée d'Or Féminin

1st Stage 1

1st Tour de Berne
2nd Chrono des Nations
6th UCI Road World Championships – Women's time trial

2007
National Road Championships

1st Time Trial
1st Road Race

2nd Tour of Flanders

2008
National Road Championships

1st Time Trial
1st Road Race

1st Stages 3 & 3 Tour de l'Aude Cycliste Féminin
10th Olympic Games, Road race
