= Florian Morizot =

French cyclist

Personal information
- Born: 10 May 1985 (age 41) Dijon, France

Cycling career
- Sport: Cycling
- Current team: Retired
- Discipline: Road
- Role: Rider

Professional teams
- 2006–2008: Auber 93
- 2009: Besson Chaussures–Sojasun
- 2010: BigMat–Auber 93

Florian Morizot (born 10 May 1985 in Dijon) is a French former road cyclist, who competed professionally between 2006 and 2010.

== Major results ==
2004
1st Time trial, National Under-23 Road Championships
2nd Chrono Champenois
2005
1st Overall Circuit des Ardennes

1st Points classification
1st Stage 3 (ITT)

3rd Time trial, National Under-23 Road Championships
2006
National Under-23 Road Championships

1st Road race
2nd Time trial

5th Chrono Champenois
2007
1st Grand Prix Cristal Energie
2008
1st Paris–Mantes-en-Yvelines
3rd Overall Tour du Poitou Charentes

1st Stage 4 (ITT)

8th Duo Normand
10th Chrono des Nations
2009
5th Chrono des Nations
5th Chrono Champenois
2010
3rd Overall Circuit des Ardennes
