= Sissy van Alebeek =

Dutch cyclist

Personal information
- Full name: Sissy van Alebeek
- Born: 8 February 1976 (age 50) Schijndel, the Netherlands

Cycling career
- Sport: Cycling

Sissy van Alebeek (born 8 February 1976 in Schijndel, North Brabant) is a professional female cyclist from the Netherlands, who won the Dutch title in 2001 and was named Rotterdam Sportswoman of the Year at the end of the year.

Awards
| Preceded by Leontien van Moorsel | Rotterdam Sportswoman of the Year; 2001 | Succeeded by Leontien van Moorsel |
