= Souvenir Magali Pache =

Race details
- Region: Switzerland
- Discipline: Time Trial
- Competition: National (2001); UCI 1.9.1 (2004); UCI 1.1 2005; UCI 1.2 (2006–2008); National (2009–2010)
- Type: One-day race

History
- First edition: 2001
- Editions: 8
- Final edition: 2010
- First winner: Leontien Van Moorsel (NED)
- Most wins: Christiane Soeder (AUT) (2 wins)
- Final winner: Emma Pooley (GBR)

The Souvenir Magali Pache was an event on the women's elite cycle racing calendar.

== Winners ==
Year	Country	Rider	Team
2001	Netherlands	Leontien Van Moorsel	
2002–2003	No race		
2004	Australia	Oenone Wood	
2005	Switzerland	Karin Thürig	
2006	Great Britain	Nicole Cooke	
2007	United States	Kristin Armstrong	
2008	Austria	Christiane Soeder	
2009	Austria	Christiane Soeder	
2010	Great Britain	Emma Pooley	
