= Leontien van Moorsel =

Dutch cyclist (born 1970)

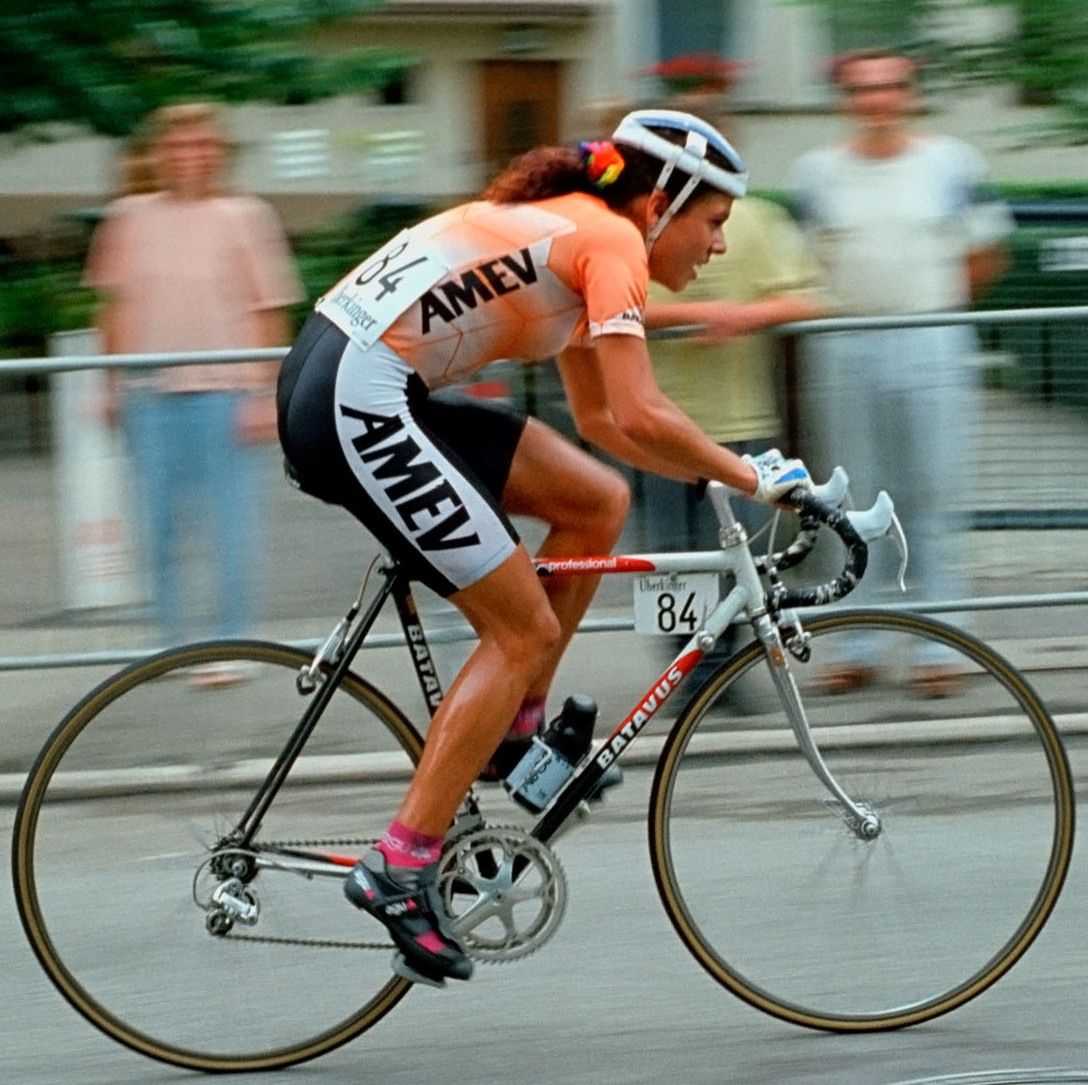
- Leontien van Moorsel in 1991

Personal information
- Full name: Leontien Martha Henrica Petronella Zijlaard-van Moorsel
- Born: 22 March 1970 (age 56) Boekel, Netherlands

Cycling career
- Sport: Cycling
- Disciplines: Road & track
- Role: Rider

Amateur teams
- 1992: KNWU AMEV Batavus A-selectie Nederland
- 1997: VKS
- 1999: Opstalan

Professional team
- 2000–2004: Hartol–Farm Frites

Major wins
- Stage races Grande Boucle Féminine Internationale (1992, 1993) Tour de l'Aude Cycliste Féminin (1991) Emakumeen Bira (2000) Trophée d'Or Féminin (2000) One day races & classics Olympic Road Champion (2000) Olympic Time Trial Champion (2000, 2004) World Road Champion (1991, 1993) World Time Trial Champion (1998, 1999) National Road Champion (1998–2000, 1992, 1993, 1998, 1999) National Time Trial Champion (1997, 1998–2002)
Medal record
Representing the Netherlands
Women's Road bicycle racing
Olympic Games
Gold medal – first place	2000 Sydney	Road race
Gold medal – first place	2000 Sydney	Time trial
Gold medal – first place	2004 Athens	Time trial
World Championships
Gold medal – first place	1991 Stuttgart	Road race
Gold medal – first place	1993 Oslo	Road race
Gold medal – first place	1998 Valkenburg	Time trial
Gold medal – first place	1999 Verona	Time trial
Silver medal – second place	1998 Valkenburg	Road race
Women's Track cycling
Olympic Games
Gold medal – first place	2000 Sydney	Individual pursuit
Silver medal – second place	2000 Sydney	Points race
Bronze medal – third place	2004 Athens	Individual pursuit
World Championships
Gold medal – first place	1990 Maebashi City	Individual pursuit
Gold medal – first place	2001 Antwerp	Individual pursuit
Gold medal – first place	2002 Copenhagen	Individual pursuit
Gold medal – first place	2003 Stuttgart	Individual pursuit
Silver medal – second place	1998 Bordeaux	Individual pursuit

Leontien Martha Henrica Petronella Zijlaard-van Moorsel (born 22 March 1970) is a Dutch retired racing cyclist. She was a dominant cyclist in the 1990s and early 2000s, winning four gold medals at the Olympic Games and holding the hour record for women from 2003 until 2015.

== Career ==
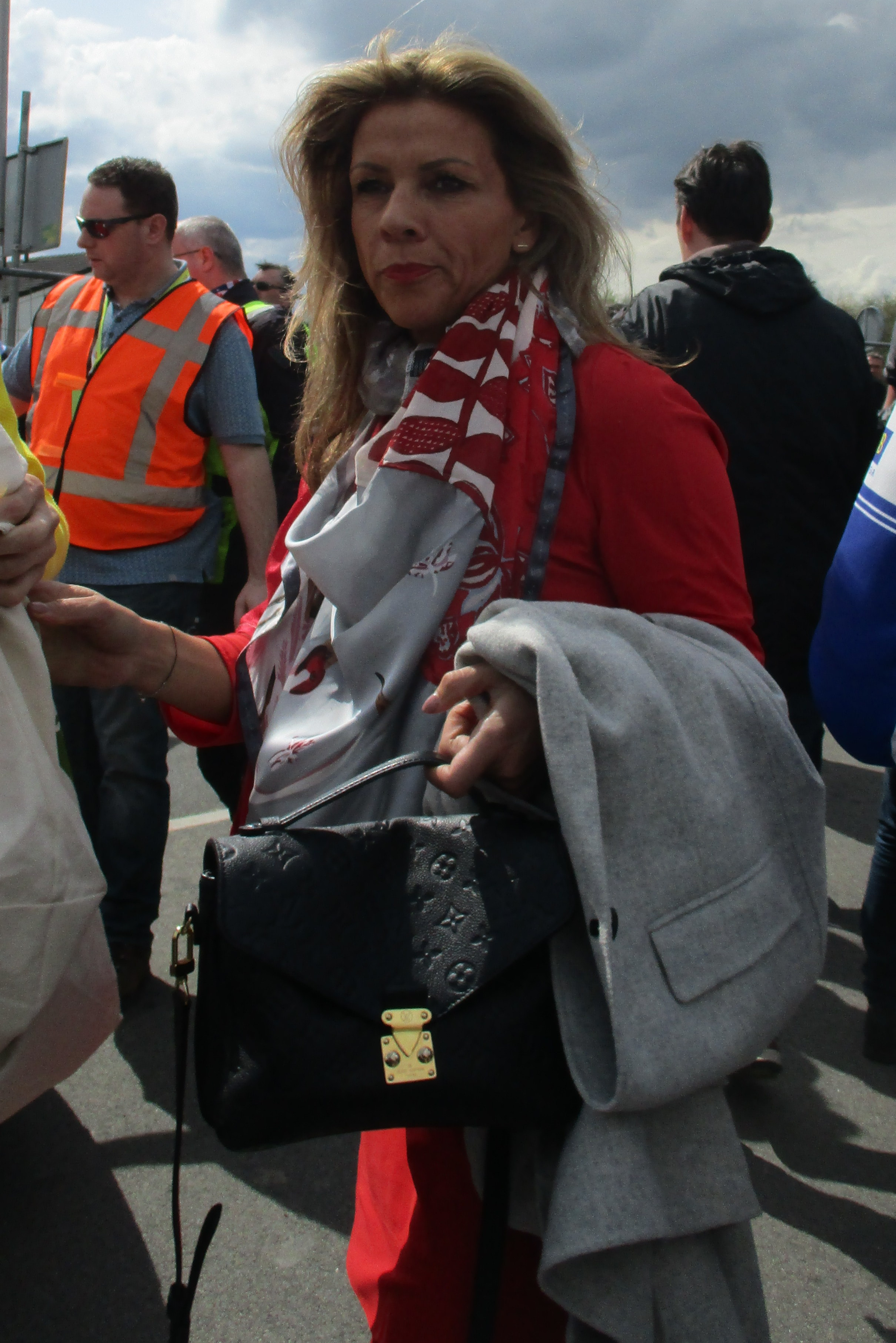
Leontien van Moorsel at the 2018 Women's Amstel Gold Race.

At the age of eight, she competed in her first cycling race. She made her Tour Féminin debut in 1989 at the age of 19, finishing 31st overall. She went on to win the Tour Féminin twice in the first half of the 1990s, establishing a notable rivalry with Jeannie Longo.

Van Moorsel dropped out of cycling in 1994 with anorexia nervosa but recovered to compete at the World Championships in 1998, winning the time trial and coming second in the road race.

At the 2000 Summer Olympics in Sydney, van Moorsel won gold medals on the road (road race and time trial), and on the track (3 km pursuit). She became the first female Olympian in history to win gold medals in two separate disciplines at the same Olympic games.

At the 2004 Summer Olympics, she fell in the penultimate lap of the road race and was stretchered off and taken to the hospital by ambulance, but nevertheless successfully defended her time trial title two days later.

She set a new world hour record for women of 46.065 km, in 2003 in Mexico City, which was not improved upon for almost 12 years, when UCI rule changes prompted a new succession of attempts.

Van Moorsel retired from professional cycling after the 2004 Olympics.

In 2017 Van Moorsel became director of the Women's Amstel Gold Race.

In September 2017, Van Moorsel was accused by sports physician Peter Janssen of using EPO in 2000 and 2001.

== Major results ==
1985
1st National Novice Road Race Championships

1987
1st National Novice Road Race Championships

1988
1st National Road Race Championships

1989
1st National Road Race Championships
1st Stage 1 Tour of Norway

1990
1st UCI Track Cycling World Championships (Individual Pursuit)
1st UCI Road World Championships Team Time Trial
1st National Road Race Championships
2nd Overall Tour de l'Aude Cycliste Féminin
National Track Championship

3rd Points race
3rd Individual sprint

3rd Chrono des Nations

1991
1st UCI Road World Championships Road Race
1st National Track Championships (Team pursuit)
1st Overall Tour de l'Aude Cycliste Féminin
3rd National Road Race Championships

1992
1st National Road Race Championships
National Track Championship

1st Individual pursuit
2nd Points race

1st Overall Grande Boucle Féminine Internationale

1993
1st UCI Road World Championships Road Race
1st Overall Grande Boucle Féminine Internationale
1st National Road Race Championships
2nd Overall Tour de l'Aude Cycliste Féminin

1997
1st National Time Trial Championships
National Track Championships

1st Individual pursuit
2nd Points race

1st Overall Boekel

1st Stages 1 & 3

1998
1st UCI Road World Championships – Women's time trial
National Road Championships

1st Road Race
1st Time Trial

National Track Championships

1st Individual pursuit
1st Points race

1st Overall Ster van Zeeland

1st Stages 1 & 3

1st Parel van de Veluwe
1st Omloop der Kempen
2nd Overall Boels Rental Ladies Tour

1st Stage 1

2nd UCI Road World Championships Road Race
2nd UCI Track Cycling World Championships (Individual Pursuit)

1999
1st UCI Road World Championships – Women's time trial
National Road Championships

1st Road Race
1st Time Trial

National Track Championships

1st Individual pursuit
1st Points race

1st Overall Boels Rental Ladies Tour

1st Stages 2 & 7

1st Overall Ster van Zeeland

1st Stages 2 & 3

1st Overall Greenery International

1st Stages 1, 2 & 3

1st Overall Boekel

1st Prologue, Stages 1 & 2

1st Damesronde van Drenthe
1st Omloop van Kanaleneiland
1st Omloop der Kempen
2nd Rotterdam Tour

2000
Olympic Games

1st Road Race
1st Time Trial
1st Individual pursuit
2nd Points race

National Road Championships

1st Time Trial
2nd Road Race

National Track Championships

1st Individual pursuit
1st Points race

1st Overall Emakumeen Bira
1st Overall Trophée d'Or Féminin
1st Overall Ster van Zeeland

1st Stages 1 & 2

1st Overall Westfriese Dorpenomloop

1st Prologue & Stage 1

1st Overall Boekel

1st Stages 1, 2a & 2b

1st Ronde van het Ronostrand
1st Omloop der Kempen
1st Stages 1, 2 & 4 Giro d'Italia Femminile

2001
1st UCI Track Cycling World Championships (Individual Pursuit)
1st National Time Trial Championships
National Track Championships

1st Individual pursuit
1st Points race

1st Overall Ster van Zeeland

1st Stages 2 & 3

1st Overall Boekel

1st Stages 2 & 3

1st Acht van Chaam
1st Egmond-Pier-Egmond
1st Souvenir Magali Pache
1st Profronde van Stiphout
1st Profronde van Surhuisterveen
1st Prologue Giro d'Italia Femminile
1st Stage 1 Boels Rental Ladies Tour
3rd Amstel Gold Race

2002
1st UCI Track Cycling World Championships (Individual Pursuit)
National Road Championships

1st Time Trial
2nd Road Race

National Track Championships

1st Individual pursuit
1st Points race

1st Overall RaboSter Zeeuwsche Eilanden

1st Stages 1, 2 & 3a

1st Overall Westfriese Dorpenomloop

1st Stages 1 & 2

1st Amstel Gold Race
1st Damesronde van Drenthe
1st Acht van Chaam
1st Egmond-Pier-Egmond
1st Profronde van Stiphout,
10th UCI Road World Championships – Women's time trial

2003
1st UCI Track Cycling World Championships (Individual Pursuit)
1st Overall Boekel

1st Stage 3

1st Omloop van Borsele
2nd National Time Trial Championships
World Hour record

2004
Olympic Games

1st Time Trial
3rd Individual pursuit

1st National Road Race Championships
1st Ronde van Gelderland
1st Omloop der Kempen
1st Profronde van Stiphout
1st Acht van Chaam

== Personal life ==
Van Moorsel married former track cyclist Michael Zijlaard in October 1995. They have a daughter, born in 2007.

== See also ==
- List of Dutch Olympic cyclists
- List of multiple Olympic gold medalists at a single Games

Awards
Preceded by Elly van Hulst	Dutch Sportswoman of the Year; 1990	Succeeded by Ingrid Haringa
Preceded by Ellen van Langen	Dutch Sportswoman of the Year; 1993	Succeeded by Anky van Grunsven
Preceded by Marianne Timmer	Dutch Sportswoman of the Year; 1999, 2000	Succeeded by Inge de Bruijn
Preceded by Verona van de Leur	Dutch Sportswoman of the Year; 2003, 2004	Succeeded by Edith van Dijk
Preceded by Francis Hoenselaar	Rotterdam Sportswoman of the Year; 1998–2000	Succeeded by Sissy van Alebeek
Preceded by Sissy van Alebeek	Rotterdam Sportswoman of the Year; 2002–2004	Succeeded by Elisabeth Willebroordse
Records
Preceded by Jeannie Longo	UCI women's hour record (46.065 km); 1 October 2003 – 12 September 2015	Succeeded by Molly Shaffer Van Houweling
