= Heidi Van De Vijver =

Belgian cyclist

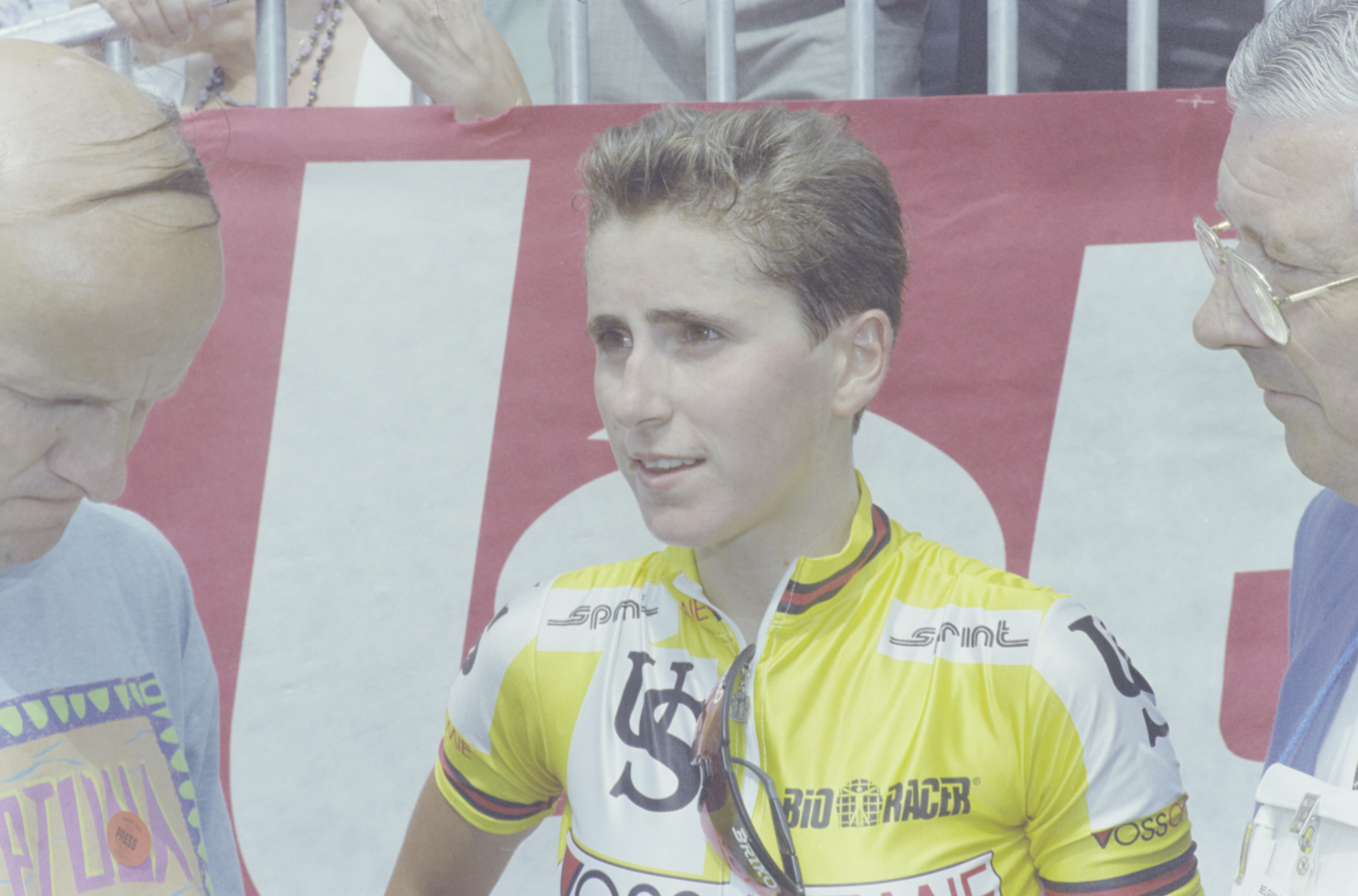
- Heidi Van De Vijver after her victory in the 1994 Belgian National Road Racing Championships (collection KOERS. Museum of Cycle Racing)

Personal information
- Full name: Heidi Van De Vijver
- Born: 31 December 1969 (age 56) Bornem, Belgium

Cycling career
- Sport: Cycling
- Current team: Fenix–Premier Tech
- Discipline: Road
- Role: Rider (retired); Directeur sportif

Amateur team
- 2004: Keukens Redant Cycling Team

Professional teams
- 1998: Ebly
- 1999–2003: Vlaanderen 2002 Ladies

Managerial teams
- 2007–2008: AA-Drink Cycling Team
- 2009–2010: Red Sun Cycling Team
- 2011–2012: Kleo Ladies
- 2013: Cyclelive Plus–Zannata
- 2014–2017: Futurumshop.nl–Zannata
- 2019: Rogelli–Gyproc–APB
- 2020: Ciclotel
- 2021–: Ciclismo Mundial

Heidi Van De Vijver (born 31 December 1969) is a Belgian former racing cyclist, who currently works as a directeur sportif for UCI Women's Continental Team Fenix–Premier Tech. She won the Belgian national road race title in 1994 and 1998. She also competed at the 1996 and 2000 Summer Olympics.

She was second in the 1992 Tour of the EEC Women and then won the race in 1993.
