= Albine Caillié =

French cyclist

Albine Caillie
Personal information
- Born: 9 November 1974 (age 51) France

Cycling career
- Sport: Cycling
- Discipline: Road cycling

Albine Caillie (born 9 November 1974) is a French road cyclist. After becoming national time trial champion in 1998 she represented her nation at the 1998 UCI Road World Championships. At the 2000 UCI Road World Championships she finished 7th in the individual time trial. In 2000 and 2001 she won the silver medal at the national time trial championships.

== Major results ==
2000
7th UCI Road World Championships – Women's time trial
