= Grande Boucle Féminine Internationale =

Women's cycling race in France

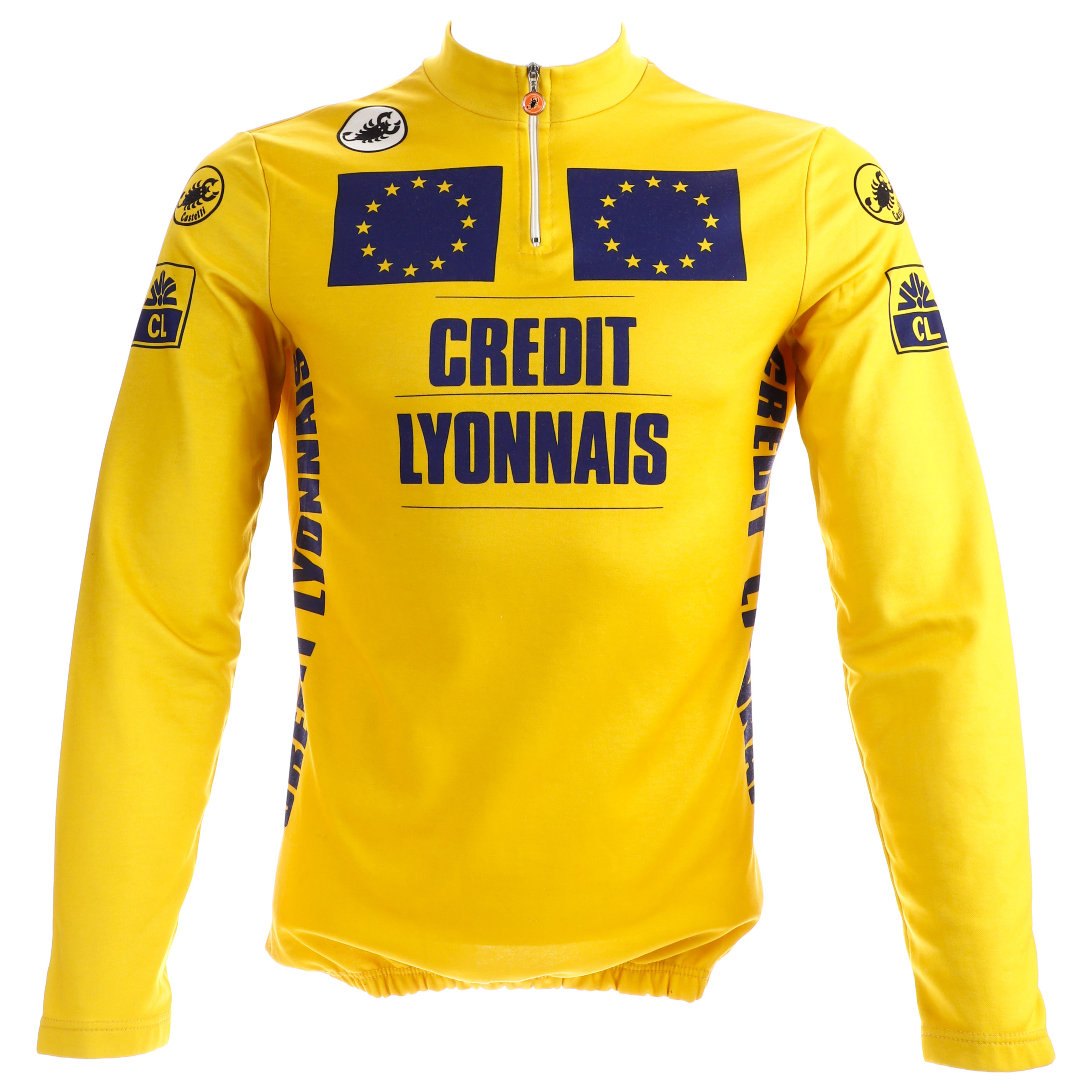
Maillot jaune from the 1993 Tour de la C.E.E. féminin, worn by winner Heidi Van De Vijver

Various professional women's cycle stage races across France have been held as an equivalent to the Tour de France for women, with the first of these races staged as a one off in 1955. From 1984, a women's Tour de France was staged consistently, although the name of the event changed several times – such as Tour de France Féminin, Tour of the EEC Women, Tour Cycliste Féminin and Grande Boucle Féminine Internationale.

Over the years, the races struggled with various issues including financial difficulties, limited media coverage, sexism and trademark difficulties with Amaury Sport Organisation (the organisers of the Tour de France). The last Grande Boucle Féminine Internationale took place in 2009.

In 2014, following criticism and campaigning from the professional peloton, Amaury Sport Organisation (ASO) – the organiser of the Tour de France – launched a one-day race for the professional peloton (La Course by Le Tour de France). In 2022, La Course was replaced by Tour de France Femmes, an 8-day stage race in the UCI Women's World Tour. The launch of the Tour de France Femmes was praised by the media, campaigners and the professional peloton.

== History of the races ==
=== 1955: the Leulliot race ===
In 1955, the first edition of a women's Tour de France was held as a one-off event. Organised by Jean Leulliot, with the event made up of five stages with 41 athletes starting. The race was won by Irish born Manx cyclist Millie Robinson. There was, however, no race organised for 1956 onwards.

=== 1984–1989: the Société du Tour de France races ===
Women's Tour de France
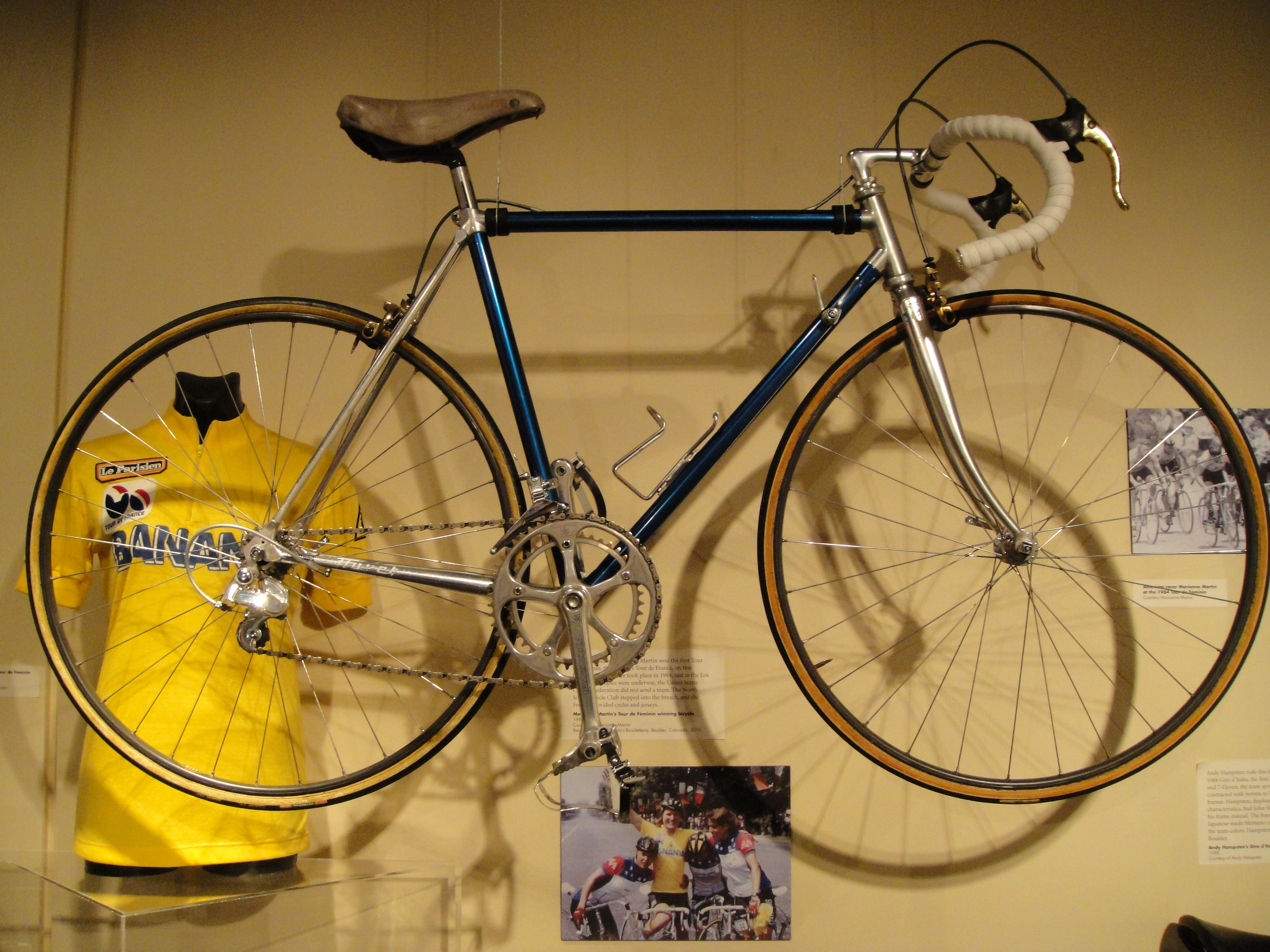
- The bicycle ridden by Marianne Martin in the 1984 Tour de France Féminin

Race details
- Region: France
- Local name: Tour de France Féminin
- Discipline: Road
- Type: Stage race
- Organiser: Société du Tour de France

History
- First edition: 1984
- Editions: 6
- Final edition: 1989
- First winner: Marianne Martin (USA)
- Most wins: Jeannie Longo (FRA) (3 wins)
- Final winner: Jeannie Longo (FRA)

In 1984, the Société du Tour de France, organizer of the men's Tour de France, decided that it would introduce a women's version of the Tour – Tour de France Féminin. From 1984 through to 1989 the race was run alongside the men's event, as a curtain raiser, with both races using the same finishing location (the women's race ran over a shorter distance for each stage). In 1989 Jean-Marie Leblanc, director of the Tour de France, halted the race in its current format, citing the economic cost of organising the race with limited media coverage and sponsorship being generated. As a result of the races dissociation from the Tour de France, the name was changed to the Tour of the EEC Women.

Year	Distance [km]	Stages	First	Second	Third
1984	1059	18	Marianne Martin (USA)	Heleen Hage (NED)	Deborah Shumway (USA)
1985	834.4	12 + Prologue	Maria Canins (ITA)	Jeannie Longo (FRA)	Cécile Odin (FRA)
1986	991.7	15 + Prologue	Maria Canins (ITA) (2)	Jeannie Longo (FRA)	Inga Thompson (USA)
1987	971.4	15 + Prologue	Jeannie Longo (FRA)	Maria Canins (ITA)	Ute Enzenauer (FRG)
1988	838.5	12 + Prologue	Jeannie Longo (FRA) (2)	Maria Canins (ITA)	Elizabeth Hepple (AUS)
1989	786	11 + Prologue	Jeannie Longo (FRA) (3)	Maria Canins (ITA)	Inga Thompson (USA)

=== 1990–1992: Tour of the EEC Women ===
Tour of the EEC Women
Race details
- Region: France
- Local name: Tour de la C.E.E. féminin
- Discipline: Road
- Type: Stage race
- Organiser: Société du Tour de France (1990–1991); Amaury Sport Organization (1992–1993)

History
- First edition: 1990
- Editions: 4
- Final edition: 1993
- First winner: Catherine Marsal (FRA)
- Most wins: No repeat winners
- Final winner: Heidi Van de Vijver (BEL)

Following the change in race format, calendar position and name of the race to the Tour de la C.E.E. féminin, the race ran for a further four editions albeit with no connection to the Tour de France, through to the 1993 season.

Year	Distance [km]	Stages	First	Second	Third
1990	866.5	9	Catherine Marsal (FRA)	Leontien van Moorsel (NED)	Astrid Schop (NED)
1991	1097.4	12 + Prologue	Astrid Schop (NED)	Leontien van Moorsel (NED)	Roberta Bonanomi (ITA)
1992	992.7	11 + Prologue	Leontien van Moorsel (NED)	Heidi Van de Vijver (BEL)	Roberta Bonanomi (ITA)
1993	1125	11 + Prologue	Heidi Van de Vijver (BEL)	Leontien van Moorsel (NED)	Aleksandra Koliaseva (RUS)

=== 1992–2009: the Pierre Boué races ===
Tour Cycliste Féminin (1992–1997) Grande Boucle Féminine Internationale (1998–2009)
Race details
- Region: France
- Discipline: Road
- Type: Stage race
- Organiser: Pierre Boué (1992–2003)

History
- First edition: 1992
- Editions: 17
- Final edition: 2009
- First winner: Leontien van Moorsel (NED)
- Most wins: Fabiana Luperini (ITA); Joane Somarriba (ESP); 3 wins each
- Final winner: Emma Pooley (GBR)

In 1992, a new race was created, the Tour Cycliste Féminin, organised in August by Pierre Boué, but again with no connection to either the Tour de France or the ASO. The race lacked stable sponsorship and with the location of stages determined by locations willing to contribute, there were long transfers between stages. Until the 1998 edition, the race was known as the Tour Cycliste Féminin, but the Société du Tour de France (now part of the ASO), organisers of the men's Tour de France, claimed that infringed their trademark.

Consequently, the name of the event was changed to Grande Boucle Féminine Internationale for the 1999 edition. The race was not held in 2004 due to organisational difficulties. It returned, albeit smaller in size and scope, in 2005. The previous races were 10 to 15 stages; Later ones had five and stayed in one region. The race also received a lower classification by the Union Cycliste Internationale (UCI), and had a reduced field. In 2008, the race was six days and seven stages. However, in 2009 the race was only four days long with only 66 riders, after a planned race start and three stages in Britain fell through, leading winner Emma Pooley to joke that the race was "more of a Petite Boucle than Grande." The race was discontinued after the 2009 edition.

Year	Distance [km]	Stages	First	Second	Third
Tour Cycliste Féminin
1992	805.5	9 + Prologue	Leontien van Moorsel (NED)	Jeannie Longo (FRA)	Heidi Van De Vijver (BEL)
1993	1183.1	12 + Prologue	Leontien van Moorsel (NED) (2)	Marion Clignet (FRA)	Heidi Van De Vijver (BEL)
1994	1300	14	Valentina Polkhanova (RUS)	Rasa Polikevičiūtė (LTU)	Cécile Odin (FRA)
1995	?	13 + Prologue	Fabiana Luperini (ITA)	Jeannie Longo (FRA)	Luzia Zberg (SUI)
1996	1238	12 + Prologue	Fabiana Luperini (ITA) (2)	Rasa Polikevičiūtė (LTU)	Jeannie Longo (FRA)
1997	1156.3	12	Fabiana Luperini (ITA) (3)	Barbara Heeb (SUI)	Linda Jackson (CAN)
Grande Boucle Féminine Internationale
1998	1392	12	Edita Pučinskaitė (LTU)	Fabiana Luperini (ITA)	Alessandra Cappellotto (ITA)
1999	1581.4	14	Diana Žiliūtė (LTU)	Valentina Polkhanova (RUS)	Edita Pučinskaitė (LTU)
2000	1456.2	14	Joane Somarriba (ESP)	Edita Pučinskaitė (LTU)	Geraldine Loewenguth (FRA)
2001	1559.7	14	Joane Somarriba (ESP) (2)	Fabiana Luperini (ITA)	Judith Arndt (GER)
2002	1568.9	14	Zinaida Stahurskaia (BLR)	Susanne Ljungskog (SWE)	Joane Somarriba (ESP)
2003	1302.8	14	Joane Somarriba (ESP) (3)	Nicole Brändli (SUI)	Judith Arndt (GER)
2004	Race not held				
2005	411.7	6	Priska Doppmann (SUI)	Edwige Pitel (FRA)	Christiane Soeder (AUT)
2006	467.4	5	Nicole Cooke (GBR)	Maryline Salvetat (FRA)	Tatsiana Sharakova (BLR)
2007	404.5	5	Nicole Cooke (GBR) (2)	Priska Doppmann (SUI)	Emma Pooley (GBR)
2008	556.9	7	Christiane Soeder (AUT)	Karin Thürig (SUI)	Nicole Cooke (GBR)
2009	306.5	4	Emma Pooley (GBR)	Christiane Soeder (AUT)	Marianne Vos (NED)

=== Other significant French stage races ===
French women's stage racing continued after the Grande Boucle ceased after the 2009 edition, with at least two further stage races – the Tour de l'Aude Cycliste Féminin and the Route de France Féminine. As with the Grande Boucle, neither of these races had a direct relationship with the Tour de France. Following further financial and organisational difficulties, the Tour de l'Aude Cycliste Féminin and the Route de France Féminine ended in 2010 and 2016 respectively.

Since 2003, the Tour Cycliste Féminin International de l'Ardèche has been held as a multi day stage race in southeastern France in the Ardèche region. For several years, this was the only international level multi day stage race in France.

== Subsequent ASO races ==
=== La Course by Le Tour de France ===
In 2013, professional cyclists Kathryn Bertine, Marianne Vos and Emma Pooley and professional triathlete Chrissie Wellington formed an activist group called Le Tour Entier (“the whole tour”), to petition ASO to launch a women's Tour de France. Following substantial media coverage, and a petition signed by over 100,000 people, the organisers of the Tour de France (ASO) launched La Course by Le Tour de France in 2014.

This race would be held in conjunction with the Tour de France, with the first edition taking place as a one-day race on the Champs-Élysées in advance of the final stage of the men's race. In subsequent years, the race took place in a variety of locations such as Pau, Col de la Colombière and Col d'Izoard in conjunction with the men's race, as the ASO argued that this was the "best way to shine a light on female cycling".

The race was initially praised for the exposure gained by 'sharing the stage' with the Tour de France, however La Course was criticised for not being a "full Tour de France", being overshadowed by the men's race and not having a challenging enough parcours. ASO were also criticised for not doing enough to promote the race. ASO stated that logistical issues mean that a men's and women's Tour de France would not be able to be staged simultaneously, and that any race must be financially sustainable.

=== Tour de France Femmes ===
In June 2021, ASO announced that they would launch a new women's stage race, Tour de France Femmes. The 8 day race would take place after the 2022 Tour de France in July 2022, with the first stage taking place on the Champs-Élysées. The men's tour director, Christian Prudhomme stated that lessons must be learned from the failure of previous events like the Grande Boucle Féminine Internationale, and the goal of ASO is to have a financially sustainable event, one "that will still exist in 100 years". The Tour de France Femmes does not succeed these historic races, with ASO stating that the 2022 race is the "1st edition" of Tour de France Femmes.
