= Tour Cycliste Féminin de la Drôme =

Women's cycling race

Race details
- Region: France
- Local name(s): Tour de la Drôme
- Discipline: Road
- Competition: National (1987); National (2002); National 2004–2005; UCI 2.2 (2006)
- Type: Stage race

History
- First edition: 1987
- Editions: 5
- First winner: Cécile Odin (FRA)
- Most wins: No repeat winners
- Most recent: Béatrice Thomas (FRA)

The Tour Cycliste Féminin de la Drôme was an event on the women's elite cycle racing calendar.

== Winners ==
Year	Country	Rider	Team
1987	France	Cécile Odin	
1988–1989	No race		
2002	France	Marina Jaunâtre	
2003	No race		
2004	Germany	Claudia Stumpf	
2005	Switzerland	Priska Doppmann	
2006	France	Béatrice Thomas	
