= Solrun Flatås =

Norwegian cyclist

Personal information
- Nationality: Norwegian
- Born: 28 August 1967 (age 59) Tynset Municipality, Norway

Sport
- Country: Norway
- Sport: Cycling

Solrun Flatås (born 28 August 1967) is a Norwegian cyclist. She was born in Tynset Municipality.

She competed at the 2000 Summer Olympics in Sydney.

== Major results ==
2000
4th UCI Road World Championships – Women's time trial
