= Italy at the UCI Road World Championships =

- IOC code: ITA
- Medals: Gold 55 Silver 50 Bronze 45 Total 150

Italy at the UCI Road World Championships is an overview of the Italian results at the UCI Road World Championships. The Italian national team is traditionally one of the most successful in the history of the sport, particularly in the men's elite road race.

== Medals by discipline ==
Note: Table counts reflect the listed medalists below. The four main Senior (Elite) events are highlighted at the top of the table. Updated after the 2026 UCI Road World Championships.

Event	Gold	Silver	Bronze	Total
Men's road race	19	21	16	56
Men's time trial	2	5	2	9
Women's road race	6	6	14	26
Women's time trial	0	1	1	2
Men's national team time trial (1962–1994)	7	3	4	14
Women's national team time trial (1987–1994)	1	1	2	4
Mixed team relay	1	1	2	4
Men's under-23 road race	7	6	4	17
Men's under-23 time trial	4	2	2	8
Women's under-23 road race	0	0	0	0
Women's under-23 time trial	1	0	1	2
Men's junior road race	12	10	9	31
Men's junior time trial	2	2	3	7
Women's junior road race	5	8	9	22
Women's junior time trial	4	4	2	10
Total	71	70	71	212

=== Most successful athletes ===
The following table lists Italian cyclists who have won at least one gold medal or multiple medals at the UCI Road World Championships.

Updated to 2026.

Ecco la tabella con le righe riordinate secondo il medagliere "all'italiana" applicato ai totali generali (Total: prima maggior numero di ori, poi argenti, poi bronzi):

Italian multi-medalists at the UCI Road World Championships
Athlete	Speciality	Period	Individual				Team / Relay				Total			
Athlete	Speciality	Period	1st place, gold medalist(s)	2nd place, silver medalist(s)	3rd place, bronze medalist(s)	Tot	1st place, gold medalist(s)	2nd place, silver medalist(s)	3rd place, bronze medalist(s)	Tot	1st place, gold medalist(s)	2nd place, silver medalist(s)	3rd place, bronze medalist(s)	Total
Filippo Ganna	Time Trial / Mixed	2019–2026	2	3	1	6	1	1	2	4	3	4	3	10
Alfredo Binda	Road Race	1927–1932	3	0	1	4	0	0	0	0	3	0	1	4
Gianfranco Contri	Team Time Trial	1991–1994	0	0	0	0	3	0	0	3	3	0	0	3
Paolo Bettini	Road Race	2001–2007	2	1	0	3	0	0	0	0	2	1	0	3
Gianni Bugno	Road Race	1990–1992	2	0	1	3	0	0	0	0	2	0	1	3
Giorgia Bronzini	Road Race	2007–2011	2	0	1	3	0	0	0	0	2	0	1	3
Pietro Guerra	Team Time Trial	1964–1966	0	0	0	0	2	0	1	3	2	0	1	3
Luciano Dalla Bona	Team Time Trial	1964–1966	0	0	0	0	2	0	1	3	2	0	1	3
Cristian Salvato	Team Time Trial	1993–1994	0	0	0	0	2	0	0	2	2	0	0	2
Luca Colombo	Team Time Trial	1991–1994	0	0	0	0	2	0	0	2	2	0	0	2
Maria Canins	Road Race / TTT	1982–1989	0	2	2	4	1	1	0	2	1	3	2	6
Francesco Moser	Road Race	1976–1978	1	2	0	3	0	0	0	0	1	2	0	3
Learco Guerra	Road Race	1930–1934	1	2	0	3	0	0	0	0	1	2	0	3
Elisa Longo Borghini	Road Race / Mixed	2012–2026	0	0	4	4	1	1	2	4	1	1	6	8
Roberta Bonanomi	Team Time Trial	1987–1993	0	0	0	0	1	1	2	4	1	1	2	4
Moreno Argentin	Road Race	1985–1987	1	1	1	3	0	0	0	0	1	1	1	3
Felice Gimondi	Road Race	1970–1973	1	1	1	3	0	0	0	0	1	1	1	3
Giuseppe Saronni	Road Race	1981–1986	1	1	1	3	0	0	0	0	1	1	1	3
Tatiana Guderzo	Road Race	2004–2018	1	1	1	3	0	0	0	0	1	1	1	3
Matteo Sobrero	Mixed	2021–2026	0	0	0	0	1	1	1	3	1	1	1	3
Eros Poli	Team Time Trial	1985–1987	0	0	0	0	1	1	1	3	1	1	1	3
Francesca Galli	Team Time Trial	1987–1989	0	0	0	0	1	1	1	3	1	1	1	3
Monica Bandini	Team Time Trial	1987–1989	0	0	0	0	1	1	1	3	1	1	1	3
Vittorio Adorni	Road Race	1964–1968	1	1	0	2	0	0	0	0	1	1	0	2
Mario Maino	Team Time Trial	1962–1963	0	0	0	0	1	1	0	2	1	1	0	2
Dino Zandegù	Team Time Trial	1962–1963	0	0	0	0	1	1	0	2	1	1	0	2
Danilo Grassi	Team Time Trial	1962–1963	0	0	0	0	1	1	0	2	1	1	0	2
Mario Scirea	Team Time Trial	1986–1987	0	0	0	0	1	1	0	2	1	1	0	2
Flavio Vanzella	Team Time Trial	1986–1987	0	0	0	0	1	1	0	2	1	1	0	2
Vittoria Guazzini	Mixed	2022–2026	0	0	0	0	1	1	0	2	1	1	0	2
Alessandra Cappellotto	RR / TT / TTT	1993–1997	1	0	1	2	0	0	1	1	1	0	2	3
Mattia Cattaneo	Mixed	2024–2026	0	0	0	0	1	0	1	2	1	0	1	2
Mino Denti	Team Time Trial	1965–1966	0	0	0	0	1	0	1	2	1	0	1	2
Fausto Coppi	Road Race	1949–1953	1	0	1	2	0	0	0	0	1	0	1	2
Edoardo Affini	Time Trial / Mixed	2021–2024	0	0	1	1	0	1	2	3	0	3	3	6
Morena Tartagni	Road Race	1968–1971	0	2	1	3	0	0	0	0	0	2	1	3
Franco Bitossi	Road Race	1972–1977	0	1	1	2	0	0	0	0	0	1	1	2
Noemi Cantele	Road Race / Time Trial	2009	0	1	1	2	0	0	0	0	0	1	1	2
Elena Cecchini	Mixed	2021–2022	0	0	0	0	0	1	1	2	0	1	1	2
Massimo Podenzana	Team Time Trial	1985–1986	0	0	0	0	0	1	1	2	0	1	1	2
Michele Dancelli	Road Race	1968–1969	0	0	2	2	0	0	0	0	0	0	2	2
Michele Bartoli	Road Race	1996–1998	0	0	2	2	0	0	0	0	0	0	2	2
Benito Pigato	Team Time Trial	1967–1968	0	0	0	0	0	0	2	2	0	0	2	2
Vittorio Marcelli	Team Time Trial	1967–1968	0	0	0	0	0	0	2	2	0	0	2	2
Flavio Martini	Team Time Trial	1967–1968	0	0	0	0	0	0	2	2	0	0	2	2

== Medalists by event ==
=== Men's events ===
==== Road race ====
The men's road race is Italy's most successful discipline, yielding a total of 56 medals (19 gold, 21 silver, 16 bronze). Starting with a podium sweep at the inaugural 1927 edition, highlights include Alfredo Binda's record three titles and back-to-back gold medals by Gianni Bugno (1991–1992) and Paolo Bettini (2006–2007).

Medal	Championship	Name
Gold	(Germany) 1927 Nürburgring	Alfredo Binda
Silver	(Germany) 1927 Nürburgring	Costante Girardengo
Bronze	(Germany) 1927 Nürburgring	Domenico Piemontesi
Bronze	(Switzerland) 1929 Zürich	Alfredo Binda
Gold	(Belgium) 1930 Liège	Alfredo Binda
Silver	(Belgium) 1930 Liège	Learco Guerra
Gold	(Denmark) 1931 Copenhagen	Learco Guerra
Gold	(Italy) 1932 Rome	Alfredo Binda
Silver	(Italy) 1932 Rome	Remo Bertoni
Silver	(Germany) 1934 Leipzig	Learco Guerra
Silver	(Switzerland) 1936 Bern	Aldo Bini
Bronze	(Denmark) 1949 Copenhagen	Fausto Coppi
Silver	(Italy) 1951 Varese	Fiorenzo Magni
Bronze	(Italy) 1951 Varese	Antonio Bevilacqua
Gold	(Switzerland) 1953 Lugano	Fausto Coppi
Gold	(France) 1958 Reims	Ercole Baldini
Silver	(Netherlands) 1959 Zandvoort	Michele Gismondi
Silver	(Switzerland) 1961 Bern	Nino Defilippis
Silver	(France) 1964 Sallanches	Vittorio Adorni
Gold	(Italy) 1968 Imola	Vittorio Adorni
Bronze	(Italy) 1968 Imola	Michele Dancelli
Bronze	(Belgium) 1969 Zolder	Michele Dancelli
Bronze	(United Kingdom) 1970 Leicester	Felice Gimondi
Silver	(Switzerland) 1971 Mendrisio	Felice Gimondi
Gold	(France) 1972 Gap	Marino Basso
Silver	(France) 1972 Gap	Franco Bitossi
Gold	(Spain) 1973 Barcelona	Felice Gimondi
Silver	(Italy) 1976 Ostuni	Francesco Moser
Bronze	(Italy) 1976 Ostuni	Tino Conti
Gold	(Venezuela) 1977 San Cristóbal	Francesco Moser
Bronze	(Venezuela) 1977 San Cristóbal	Franco Bitossi
Silver	(West Germany) 1978 Nürburgring	Francesco Moser
Silver	(France) 1980 Sallanches	Gianbattista Baronchelli
Silver	(Czechoslovakia) 1981 Prague	Giuseppe Saronni
Gold	(United Kingdom) 1982 Chichester	Giuseppe Saronni
Silver	(Spain) 1984 Barcelona	Claudio Corti
Bronze	(Italy) 1985 Giavera del Montello	Moreno Argentin
Gold	(United States) 1986 Colorado Springs	Moreno Argentin
Bronze	(United States) 1986 Colorado Springs	Giuseppe Saronni
Silver	(Austria) 1987 Villach	Moreno Argentin
Gold	(Belgium) 1988 Ronse	Maurizio Fondriest
Bronze	(Japan) 1990 Utsunomiya	Gianni Bugno
Gold	(Germany) 1991 Stuttgart	Gianni Bugno
Gold	(Spain) 1992 Benidorm	Gianni Bugno
Silver	(Italy) 1994 Agrigento	Claudio Chiappucci
Bronze	(Colombia) 1995 Duitama	Marco Pantani
Bronze	(Switzerland) 1996 Lugano	Michele Bartoli
Bronze	(Netherlands) 1998 Valkenburg	Michele Bartoli
Silver	(Portugal) 2001 Lisbon	Paolo Bettini
Gold	(Belgium) 2002 Zolder	Mario Cipollini
Bronze	(Italy) 2004 Verona	Luca Paolini
Gold	(Austria) 2006 Salzburg	Paolo Bettini
Gold	(Germany) 2007 Stuttgart	Paolo Bettini
Gold	(Italy) 2008 Varese	Alessandro Ballan
Silver	(Italy) 2008 Varese	Damiano Cunego
Silver	(United Kingdom) 2019 Harrogate	Matteo Trentin

==== Time trial ====
The men's time trial has yielded 9 medals (2 gold, 5 silver, 2 bronze) for Italy, largely dominated by Filippo Ganna, who won back-to-back world titles in 2020 and 2021.

Medal	Championship	Name
Silver	(Italy) 1994 Agrigento	Andrea Chiurato
Silver	(United States) 2015 Richmond	Adriano Malori
Bronze	(United Kingdom) 2019 Harrogate	Filippo Ganna
Gold	(Italy) 2020 Imola	Filippo Ganna
Gold	(Belgium) 2021 Flanders	Filippo Ganna
Silver	(United Kingdom) 2023 Glasgow	Filippo Ganna
Silver	(Switzerland) 2024 Zurich	Filippo Ganna
Bronze	(Switzerland) 2024 Zurich	Edoardo Affini
Silver	(Canada) 2026 Montreal	Filippo Ganna

==== National team time trial (discontinued) ====
The men's national team time trial was contested 27 times between 1962 and 1994 before being discontinued. Italy was one of the most dominant nations in the event, securing 14 medals (7 gold, 3 silver, 4 bronze).

Medal	Championship	Team
Gold	(Italy) 1962 Salò di Garda	Mario Maino, Antonio Tagliani, Dino Zandegù, Danilo Grassi
Silver	(Belgium) 1963 Ronse	Mario Maino, Pasquale Fabbri, Danilo Grassi, Dino Zandegù
Gold	(France) 1964 Sallanches	Severino Andreoli, Luciano Dalla Bona, Pietro Guerra, Ferruccio Manza
Gold	(Spain) 1965 San Sebastián	Pietro Guerra, Luciano Dalla Bona, Mino Denti, Giuseppe Soldi
Bronze	(West Germany) 1966 Nürburgring	Attilio Benfatto, Luciano Dalla Bona, Mino Denti, Pietro Guerra
Bronze	(Netherlands) 1967 Heerlen	Lorenzo Bosisio, Benito Pigato, Vittorio Marcelli, Flavio Martini
Bronze	(Italy) 1968 Imola	Vittorio Marcelli, Flavio Martini, Giovanni Bramucci, Benito Pigato
Silver	(Venezuela) 1977 San Cristóbal	Mirko Bernardi, Mauro De Pellegrini, Vito Da Ros, Dino Porrini
Bronze	(Italy) 1985 Giavera del Montello	Marcello Bartalini, Massimo Podenzana, Eros Poli, Claudio Vandelli
Silver	(United States) 1986 Colorado Springs	Eros Poli, Massimo Podenzana, Mario Scirea, Flavio Vanzella
Gold	(Austria) 1987 Villach	Roberto Fortunato, Eros Poli, Mario Scirea, Flavio Vanzella
Gold	(Germany) 1991 Stuttgart	Flavio Anastasia, Luca Colombo, Gianfranco Contri, Andrea Peron
Gold	(Norway) 1993 Oslo	Cristian Salvato, Gianfranco Contri, Rossano Brasi, Rosario Fina
Gold	(Italy) 1994 Agrigento	Cristian Salvato, Gianfranco Contri, Gianluca Colombo, Dario Andriotto

=== Women's events ===
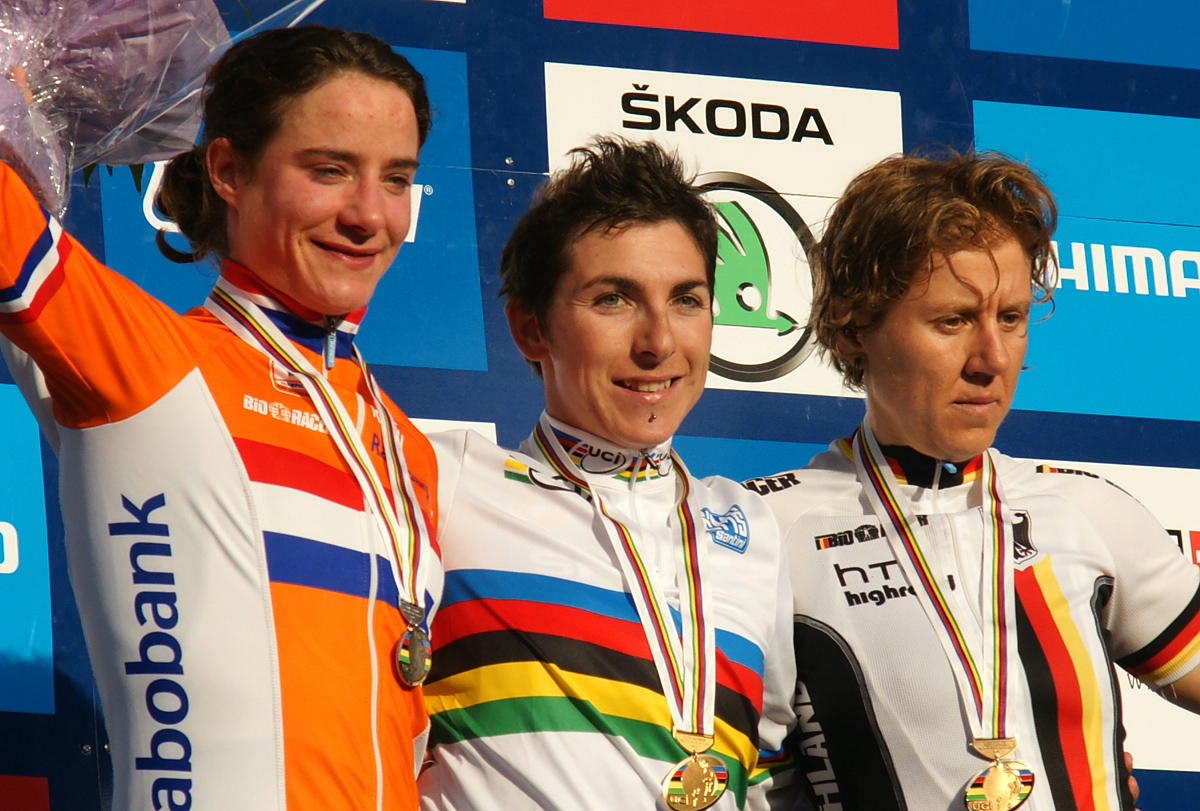
Giorgia Bronzini won the women's road race at the 2011 UCI Road World Championships. (Marianne Vos (2) and Ina-Yoko Teutenberg (3))

==== Road race ====
The women's road race has been a major source of success for Italy, claiming 25 medals (6 gold, 6 silver, 13 bronze). Highlights include back-to-back titles by Giorgia Bronzini (2010–2011) and Alessandra Cappellotto becoming Italy's first female road race world champion in 1997.

Medal	Championship	Name
Bronze	(Italy) 1968 Imola	Morena Tartagni
Silver	(United Kingdom) 1970 Leicester	Morena Tartagni
Silver	(Switzerland) 1971 Mendrisio	Morena Tartagni
Silver	(Italy) 1976 Ostuni	Laura Bissoli
Bronze	(West Germany) 1978 Nürburgring	Eva Lorenzo
Silver	(United Kingdom) 1982 Chichester	Maria Canins
Bronze	(Switzerland) 1983 Altenrhein	Maria Canins
Silver	(Italy) 1985 Giavera del Montello	Maria Canins
Bronze	(France) 1989 Chambéry	Maria Canins
Bronze	(Japan) 1990 Utsunomiya	Luisa Seghezzi
Gold	(Spain) 1997 San Sebastián	Alessandra Cappellotto
Silver	(Italy) 2004 Verona	Tatiana Guderzo
Gold	(Germany) 2007 Stuttgart	Marta Bastianelli
Bronze	(Germany) 2007 Stuttgart	Giorgia Bronzini
Gold	(Switzerland) 2009 Mendrisio	Tatiana Guderzo
Bronze	(Switzerland) 2009 Mendrisio	Noemi Cantele
Gold	(Australia) 2010 Geelong	Giorgia Bronzini
Gold	(Denmark) 2011 Copenhagen	Giorgia Bronzini
Bronze	(Netherlands) 2012 Valkenburg	Elisa Longo Borghini
Bronze	(Italy) 2013 Florence	Rossella Ratto
Bronze	(Austria) 2018 Innsbruck	Tatiana Guderzo
Bronze	(Italy) 2020 Imola	Elisa Longo Borghini
Gold	(Belgium) 2021 Flanders	Elisa Balsamo
Bronze	(Australia) 2022 Wollongong	Silvia Persico
Bronze	(Switzerland) 2024 Zurich	Elisa Longo Borghini
Bronze	(Canada) 2026 Montreal	Elisa Longo Borghini

==== Time trial ====
The women's time trial has brought Italy only 2 medals (1 silver, 1 bronze).

Medal	Championship	Name
Bronze	(Switzerland) 1996 Lugano	Alessandra Cappellotto
Silver	(Switzerland) 2009 Mendrisio	Noemi Cantele

==== National team time trial (discontinued) ====
The women's national team time trial was contested 8 times between 1987 and 1994 before being discontinued. Italy enjoyed great success in the discipline, securing 4 medals (1 gold, 1 silver, 2 bronze), highlighted by the world title in 1988 featuring Maria Canins and Roberta Bonanomi.

Medal	Championship	Team
Bronze	(Austria) 1987 Villach	Francesca Galli, Roberta Bonanomi, Imelda Chiappa, Monica Bandini
Gold	(Belgium) 1988 Ronse	Monica Bandini, Roberta Bonanomi, Maria Canins, Francesca Galli
Silver	(France) 1989 Chambéry	Monica Bandini, Roberta Bonanomi, Maria Canins, Francesca Galli
Bronze	(Norway) 1993 Oslo	Roberta Bonanomi, Alessandra Cappellotto, Michela Fanini, Fabiana Luperini

=== Mixed events ===
==== Mixed team relay ====
Introduced in 2019, the mixed team relay has seen Italy become a consistent contender, securing 4 medals (1 gold, 1 silver, 2 bronze). Key pillars Filippo Ganna and Elisa Longo Borghini featured in all four podium performances, culminating in Italy's first world title in 2026.

Medal	Championship	Name
Bronze	(Belgium) 2021 Flanders	Marta Cavalli, Elena Cecchini, Elisa Longo Borghini, Edoardo Affini, Filippo Ganna, Matteo Sobrero
Silver	(Australia) 2022 Wollongong	Edoardo Affini, Matteo Sobrero, Filippo Ganna, Elisa Longo Borghini, Elena Cecchini, Vittoria Guazzini
Bronze	(Switzerland) 2024 Zurich	Edoardo Affini, Mattia Cattaneo, Filippo Ganna, Elisa Longo Borghini, Soraya Paladin, Gaia Realini
Gold	(Canada) 2026 Montreal	Mattia Cattaneo, Filippo Ganna, Matteo Sobrero, Vittoria Guazzini, Elisa Longo Borghini, Monica Trinca Colonel

=== Under-23 events ===
==== Men's Under-23 road race ====
Medal	Championship	Name
Gold	(Switzerland) 1996 Lugano	Giuliano Figueras
Silver	(Switzerland) 1996 Lugano	Roberto Sgambelluri
Bronze	(Switzerland) 1996 Lugano	Luca Sironi
Gold	(Netherlands) 1998 Valkenburg	Ivan Basso
Silver	(Netherlands) 1998 Valkenburg	Rinaldo Nocentini
Bronze	(Netherlands) 1998 Valkenburg	Danilo Di Luca
Gold	(Italy) 1999 Verona	Leonardo Giordani
Silver	(Italy) 1999 Verona	Luca Paolini
Bronze	(France) 2000 Plouay	Lorenzo Bernucci
Silver	(Portugal) 2001 Lisbon	Giampaolo Caruso
Gold	(Belgium) 2002 Zolder	Francesco Chicchi
Silver	(Italy) 2008 Varese	Simone Ponzi
Silver	(United States) 2015 Richmond	Simone Consonni
Bronze	(Qatar) 2016 Doha	Jakub Mareczko
Gold	(United Kingdom) 2019 Harrogate	Samuele Battistella
Gold	(Belgium) 2021 Flanders	Filippo Baroncini
Gold	(Rwanda) 2025 Kigali	Lorenzo Finn

==== Men's Under-23 time trial ====
Medal	Championship	Name
Gold	(Switzerland) 1996 Lugano	Luca Sironi
Silver	(Switzerland) 1996 Lugano	Roberto Sgambelluri
Gold	(Spain) 1997 San Sebastián	Fabio Malberti
Bronze	(Netherlands) 1998 Valkenburg	Gian-Mario Ortenzi
Bronze	(Italy) 2004 Verona	Vincenzo Nibali
Gold	(Italy) 2008 Varese	Adriano Malori
Gold	(United Kingdom) 2023 Glasgow	Lorenzo Milesi
Silver	(Canada) 2026 Montreal	Nicolas Milesi

==== Women's Under-23 road race ====
Medal	Championship	Name
Gold	(Australia) 2022 Wollongong	Vittoria Guazzini
Bronze	(Rwanda) 2025 Kigali	Federica Venturelli

=== Junior events ===
==== Men's Junior road race ====
Medal	Championship	Name
Gold	(Belgium) 1975 Yvoir	Roberto Visentini
Bronze	(Belgium) 1975 Yvoir	Alberto Massuco
Silver	(Italy) 1976 Ostuni	Corrado Donadio
Gold	(France) 1980 Sallanches	Roberto Ciampi
Silver	(Spain) 1984 Barcelona	Franco Cavallini
Gold	(Belgium) 1988 Ronse	Gianluca Tarocco
Bronze	(Belgium) 1988 Ronse	Alessandro Bertolini
Gold	(Japan) 1990 Utsunomiya	Marco Serpellini
Bronze	(Germany) 1991 Stuttgart	Eddy Mazzoleni
Gold	(Spain) 1992 Benidorm	Giuseppe Palumbo
Silver	(Spain) 1992 Benidorm	Pasquale Santoro
Gold	(Norway) 1993 Oslo	Giuseppe Palumbo
Bronze	(Norway) 1993 Oslo	Michele Rezzani
Gold	(Colombia) 1995 Duitama	Valentino China
Silver	(Colombia) 1995 Duitama	Ivan Basso
Bronze	(Colombia) 1995 Duitama	Rinaldo Nocentini
Bronze	(Switzerland) 1996 Lugano	Claudio Astolfi
Gold	(Spain) 1997 San Sebastián	Crescenzo D'Amore
Silver	(Netherlands) 1998 Valkenburg	Filippo Pozzato
Gold	(Italy) 1999 Verona	Damiano Cunego
Silver	(France) 2000 Plouay	Antonio Bucciero
Gold	(Austria) 2006 Salzburg	Diego Ulissi
Gold	(Germany) 2007 Stuttgart	Diego Ulissi
Silver	(Germany) 2007 Stuttgart	Daniele Ratto
Bronze	(Germany) 2007 Stuttgart	Elia Favilli
Silver	(Italy) 2008 Varese	Mattia Cattaneo
Silver	(Norway) 2017 Bergen	Luca Rastelli
Bronze	(Norway) 2017 Bergen	Michele Gazzoli
Bronze	(Austria) 2018 Innsbruck	Alessandro Fancellu
Silver	(United Kingdom) 2019 Harrogate	Alessio Martinelli
Gold	(Switzerland) 2024 Zurich	Lorenzo Finn

==== Men's Junior time trial ====
Medal	Championship	Name
Silver	(Colombia) 1995 Duitama	Mirko Lauria
Gold	(Switzerland) 1996 Lugano	Simone Lo Vano
Bronze	(Netherlands) 1998 Valkenburg	Filippo Pozzato
Bronze	(Belgium) 2002 Zolder	Vincenzo Nibali
Silver	(Norway) 2017 Bergen	Antonio Puppio
Bronze	(Austria) 2018 Innsbruck	Andrea Piccolo
Gold	(United Kingdom) 2019 Harrogate	Antonio Tiberi

==== Women's Junior road race ====
Medal	Championship	Name
Bronze	(Austria) 1987 Villach	Ellis Guazzaroni
Bronze	(Germany) 1991 Stuttgart	Fabiana Luperini
Silver	(Norway) 1993 Oslo	Cinzia Faccin
Gold	(Switzerland) 1996 Lugano	Alessandra D'Ettore
Bronze	(Switzerland) 1996 Lugano	Martina Corazza
Bronze	(Italy) 1999 Verona	Noemi Cantele
Silver	(Italy) 2004 Verona	Marta Bastianelli
Silver	(Austria) 2006 Salzburg	Marina Romoli
Bronze	(Austria) 2006 Salzburg	Eleonora Patuzzo
Gold	(Germany) 2007 Stuttgart	Eleonora Patuzzo
Bronze	(Germany) 2007 Stuttgart	Valentina Scandolara
Silver	(Italy) 2008 Varese	Rossella Callovi
Gold	(Switzerland) 2009 Mendrisio	Rossella Callovi
Bronze	(Switzerland) 2009 Mendrisio	Susanna Zorzi
Silver	(Australia) 2010 Geelong	Rossella Ratto
Bronze	(Netherlands) 2012 Valkenburg	Anna Zita Maria Stricker
Silver	(Spain) 2014 Ponferrada	Sofia Bertizzolo
Gold	(Qatar) 2016 Doha	Elisa Balsamo
Gold	(Norway) 2017 Bergen	Elena Pirrone
Bronze	(Norway) 2017 Bergen	Letizia Paternoster
Silver	(Rwanda) 2025 Kigali	Chantal Pegolo
Silver	(Canada) 2026 Montreal	Matilde Rossignoli

==== Women's Junior time trial ====
Medal	Championship	Name
Gold	(Italy) 1994 Agrigento	Chiara Mariani
Gold	(Colombia) 1995 Duitama	Linda Visentin
Bronze	(Switzerland) 1996 Lugano	Samanta Loschi
Gold	(Belgium) 2002 Zolder	Anna Zugno
Silver	(Belgium) 2002 Zolder	Tatiana Guderzo
Silver	(Qatar) 2016 Doha	Lisa Morzenti
Gold	(Norway) 2017 Bergen	Elena Pirrone
Silver	(Norway) 2017 Bergen	Alessia Vigilia
Silver	(Austria) 2018 Innsbruck	Camilla Alessio
Bronze	(United Kingdom) 2023 Glasgow	Federica Venturelli

== UCI Teams (Trade Teams) ==
From 2012 to 2018, there was a men's and women's team time trial event for commercial trade teams. These medals are included under the UCI registration country of the team, regardless of the nationality of the individual riders.

Medal	Championship	Name (Italy)	Member	Team	Event
Silver	(Netherlands) 2012 Valkenburg	Alessandro Ballan, Marco Pinotti, Manuel Quinziato	(Belgium) Philippe Gilbert, (United States) Taylor Phinney, (United States) Tejay van Garderen	(United States) BMC Racing Team	Men's team time trial
Gold	(Spain) 2014 Ponferrada	Daniel Oss, Manuel Quinziato	(Australia) Rohan Dennis, (Switzerland) Silvan Dillier, (United States) Tejay van Garderen, (Slovakia) Peter Velits	(United States) BMC Racing Team	Men's team time trial
Gold	(United States) 2015 Richmond	Daniel Oss, Manuel Quinziato	(Australia) Rohan Dennis, (Switzerland) Silvan Dillier, (Switzerland) Stefan Küng, (United States) Taylor Phinney	(United States) BMC Racing Team	Men's team time trial
Bronze	(United States) 2015 Richmond	Adriano Malori	(Costa Rica) Andrey Amador, (Spain) Jonathan Castroviejo, (United Kingdom) Alex Dowsett, (Spain) Jon Izagirre, (Germany) Jasha Sütterlin	(Spain) Movistar Team	Men's team time trial
Silver	(Qatar) 2016 Doha	Daniel Oss, Manuel Quinziato	(Australia) Rohan Dennis, (Switzerland) Stefan Küng, (United States) Taylor Phinney, (United States) Joey Rosskopf	(United States) BMC Racing Team	Men's team time trial
Silver	(Norway) 2017 Bergen	Daniel Oss	(Australia) Rohan Dennis, (Switzerland) Silvan Dillier, (Switzerland) Stefan Küng, (Australia) Miles Scotson, (United States) Tejay van Garderen	(United States) BMC Racing Team	Men's team time trial
Bronze	(Norway) 2017 Bergen	Gianni Moscon	(United Kingdom) Owain Doull, (United Kingdom) Chris Froome, (Belarus) Vasil Kiryienka, (Poland) Michał Kwiatkowski, (United Kingdom) Geraint Thomas	(United Kingdom) Team Sky	Men's team time trial
Bronze	(Austria) 2018 Innsbruck	Damiano Caruso	(New Zealand) Patrick Bevin, (Australia) Rohan Dennis, (Switzerland) Stefan Küng, (Belgium) Greg Van Avermaet, (United States) Tejay van Garderen	(United States) BMC Racing Team	Men's team time trial
Silver	(Spain) 2014 Ponferrada	Valentina Scandolara	(Australia) Annette Edmondson, (Australia) Melissa Hoskins, (Sweden) Emma Johansson, (Australia) Jessie MacLean, (Australia) Amanda Spratt	(Australia) Orica–AIS	Women's team time trial
Bronze	(Spain) 2014 Ponferrada	Simona Frapporti, Silvia Valsecchi, Susanna Zorzi	(Belarus) Alena Amialiusik, (Switzerland) Doris Schweizer, (United States) Alison Tetrick	(Italy) Astana BePink Women Team	Women's team time trial
Gold	(United States) 2015 Richmond	Barbara Guarischi	(Belarus) Alena Amialiusik, (Germany) Lisa Brennauer, (Canada) Karol-Ann Canuel, (Germany) Mieke Kröger, (Germany) Trixi Worrack	(Germany) Velocio–SRAM	Women's team time trial
Silver	(Qatar) 2016 Doha	Elena Cecchini	(Belarus) Alena Amialiusik, (United Kingdom) Hannah Barnes, (Germany) Lisa Brennauer, (Germany) Mieke Kröger, (Germany) Trixi Worrack	(Germany) Canyon–SRAM	Women's team time trial
Gold	(Austria) 2018 Innsbruck	Elena Cecchini	(Belarus) Alena Amialiusik, (United Kingdom) Alice Barnes, (United Kingdom) Hannah Barnes, (Germany) Lisa Klein, (Germany) Trixi Worrack	(Germany) Canyon–SRAM	Women's team time trial

== Medal table ==
=== Medals by year ===
Note: The medal table and the resulting rankings are calculated by excluding the results obtained in the men's amateur road race, which was held from 1921 to 1995.

Over the history of the UCI Road World Championships, Italy has achieved remarkable success. Out of the 92 editions listed, the Italian national team has topped the overall medal table 29 times. In 14 editions, they finished in second place, and 9 times they placed third. There have been only 21 editions in which Italy did not win any medals.

Championship	Gold	Silver	Bronze	Total	Rank
(Germany) 1927 Nürburgring	1	1	1	3	1
(Hungary) 1928 Budapest	0	0	0	0	-
(Switzerland) 1929 Zürich	0	0	1	1	3
(Belgium) 1930 Liège	1	1	0	2	1
(Denmark) 1931 Copenhagen	1	0	0	1	1
(Italy) 1932 Rome	1	1	0	2	1
(France) 1933 Montlhéry	0	0	0	0	-
(Germany) 1934 Leipzig	0	1	0	1	2
(Belgium) 1935 Floreffe	0	0	0	0	-
(Switzerland) 1936 Bern	0	1	0	1	2
(Denmark) 1937 Copenhagen	0	0	0	0	-
(Netherlands) 1938 Valkenburg	0	0	0	0	-
(Switzerland) 1946 Zürich	0	0	0	0	-
(France) 1947 Reims	0	0	0	0	-
(Netherlands) 1948 Valkenburg	0	0	0	0	-
(Denmark) 1949 Copenhagen	0	0	1	1	3
(Belgium) 1950 Moorslede	0	0	0	0	-
(Italy) 1951 Varese	0	1	1	2	2
1952 Luxembourg	0	0	0	0	-
(Switzerland) 1953 Lugano	1	0	0	1	1
(Germany) 1954 Solingen	0	0	0	0	-
(Italy) 1955 Frascati	0	0	0	0	-
(Denmark) 1956 Copenhagen	0	0	0	0	-
(Belgium) 1957 Waregem	0	0	0	0	-
(France) 1958 Reims	1	0	0	1	1
(Netherlands) 1959 Zandvoort	0	1	0	1	4
(Germany) 1960 Sachsenring	0	0	0	0	-
(Germany) 1961 Bern	0	1	0	1	2
(Italy) 1962 Salò	1	0	0	1	2
(Belgium) 1963 Renaix	0	1	0	1	3
(France) 1964 Sallanches	1	1	0	2	1
(Spain) 1965 Lasarte-Oria	1	0	0	1	1
(Germany) 1966 Nürburgring	0	0	1	1	5
(Netherlands) 1967 Heerlen	0	0	1	1	7
(Italy) 1968 Imola	1	0	3	4	1
(Belgium) 1969 Zolder	0	0	1	1	7
(United Kingdom) 1970 Leicester	0	1	1	2	3
(Switzerland) 1971 Mendrisio	0	2	0	2	3
(France) 1972 Gap	1	1	0	2	1
(Spain) 1973 Barcelona	1	0	0	1	2
(Canada) 1974 Montreal	0	0	0	0	-
(Belgium) 1975 Mettet et Yvoir	0	0	0	0	-
(Italy) 1976 Ostuni	0	2	0	2	3
(Venezuela) 1977 San Cristóbal	1	1	1	3	1
(Germany) 1978 Nürburgring	0	1	1	2	4
(Netherlands) 1979 Valkenburg	0	0	0	0	-
(France) 1980 Sallanches	0	1	0	1	3
(Czech Republic) 1981 Prague	0	1	0	1	5
(United Kingdom) 1982 Goodwood	1	1	0	2	1
(Switzerland) 1983 Altenrhein	0	0	1	1	6
(Spain) 1984 Barcelona	0	1	0	1	2
(Italy) 1985 Giavera del Montello	0	1	2	3	4
(United States) 1986 Colorado Springs	1	1	1	3	1
(Austria) 1987 Villach	1	1	1	3	1
(France) 1988 Ronse	2	0	0	2	1
(France) 1989 Chambéry	0	1	1	2	5
(Japan) 1990 Utsunomiya	0	0	2	2	7
(Germany) 1991 Stuttgart	2	0	0	2	1
(Spain) 1992 Benidorm	1	0	0	1	1
(Norway) 1993 Oslo	1	0	1	2	3
(Argentina) 1994 Agrigento	1	2	0	3	1
(Colombia) 1995 Duitema	0	0	1	1	5
(Switzerland) 1996 Lugano	2	2	3	7	1
(Spain) 1997 San Sebastián	3	0	0	3	2
(Netherlands) 1998 Valkenburg	1	2	4	7	3
(Italy) 1999 Treviso/Verona	2	1	1	4	1
(France) 2000 Plouay	0	1	1	2	10
(Portugal) 2001 Lisbon	0	2	0	2	9
(Belgium) 2002 Zolder/Hasselt	3	1	1	5	1
(Canada) 2003 Hamilton	0	0	0	0	-
(Italy) 2004 Verona	0	2	2	4	8
(Spain) 2005 Madrid	0	0	0	0	-
(Austria) 2006 Salzburg	1	0	0	1	4
(Germany) 2007 Stuttgart	2	0	1	3	1
(Italy) 2008 Varese	2	2	0	4	1
(Switzerland) 2009 Mendrisio	1	1	1	3	2
(Australia) 2010 Geelong	1	0	0	1	4
(Denmark) 2011 Copenhagen	1	0	0	1	6
(Netherlands) 2012 Limburg	0	0	2	2	13
(Italy) 2013 Tuscany	0	0	1	1	16
(Spain) 2014 Ponferrada	0	1	1	2	9
(United States) 2015 Richmond	0	2	0	2	11
(Qatar) 2016 Doha	1	1	1	3	5
(Norway) 2017 Bergen	2	3	2	7	2
(Austria) 2018 Innsbruck	0	1	3	4	10
(United Kingdom) 2019 Harrogate	2	2	1	5	3
(Italy) 2020 Imola	1	0	1	2	2
(Belgium) 2021 Flanders	3	0	1	4	1
(Australia) 2022 Wollongong	1	1	1	3	6
(United Kingdom) 2023 Glasgow	1	1	1	3	6
(Switzerland) 2024 Zurich	1	1	3	5	5
(Rwanda) 2025 Kigali	1	1	1	3	7
(Canada) 2026 Montreal	1	3	1	5	4

=== Medals by year (Junior Championships) ===
The UCI Junior Road World Championships were first held in 1975 (with women's events added in 1987 and time trials in 1994/1995). From 1975 to 1996 and again from 2005 to 2010, the junior races were organized as an independent event separate from the senior championships. Between 1997–2004 and since 2011, junior events have been fully integrated into the main UCI Road World Championships.

Championship	Gold	Silver	Bronze	Total	Rank
(Switzerland) 1975 Lausanne	1	0	1	2	1
(Belgium) 1976 Liège	0	1	0	1	2
1980 Mexico	1	0	0	1	1
(France) 1984 Beuvron	0	1	0	1	2
(Italy) 1987 Bergame	0	0	1	1	4
(Denmark) 1988 Odense	1	0	1	2	1
(United Kingdom) 1990 Middelsborough	1	0	0	1	1
(United States) 1991 Colorado Springs	0	0	2	2	5
(Greece) 1992 Olympia	1	1	0	2	1
(Australia) 1993 Perth	1	1	1	3	1
(San Marino) 1995 Forli	2	2	1	5	1
(Slovenia) 1996 Novo Mesto	2	0	3	5	1
(Belgium) 2006 Spa-Francorchamps	1	1	1	3	1
(Mexico) 2007 Aguascalientes	2	1	2	5	1
(South Africa) 2008 Cape Town	0	2	0	2	5
(Russia) 2009 Moscow	1	0	1	2	1
(Italy) 2010 Offida	0	1	0	1	5
Total	14	11	14	39	—
