= List of teams and cyclists in the 1968 Tour de France =

List of cyclists

The 1968 Tour de France started with 110 cyclists, divided into 11 teams of 10 cyclists:

- France A
- France B
- France C
- Germany
- Belgium A
- Belgium B
- Spain
- Great Britain
- Italy
- Netherlands
- Switzerland/Luxembourg (combined)

== Start list ==
=== By team ===
France A
| No. | Rider | Pos. |
|---|---|---|
| 1 | Roger Pingeon (FRA) | 5 |
| 2 | Jean-Pierre Genet (FRA) | 41 |
| 3 | Bernard Guyot (FRA) | 27 |
| 4 | Jean Jourden (FRA) | DNF |
| 5 | Anatole Novak (FRA) | 50 |
| 6 | Raymond Poulidor (FRA) | DNF |
| 7 | Christian Raymond (FRA) | 45 |
| 8 | Raymond Riotte (FRA) | DNF |
| 9 | José Samyn (FRA) | DNF |
| 10 | Jean Stablinski (FRA) | DNF |

France B
| No. | Rider | Pos. |
|---|---|---|
| 11 | Lucien Aimar (FRA) | 7 |
| 12 | Gilbert Bellone (FRA) | 40 |
| 13 | Serge Bolley (FRA) | 48 |
| 14 | Georges Chappe (FRA) | 42 |
| 15 | Jean-Pierre Ducasse (FRA) | 31 |
| 16 | Fernand Etter (FRA) | DNF |
| 17 | Michel Grain (FRA) | 37 |
| 18 | Charly Grosskost (FRA) | 17 |
| 19 | Jean-Marie Leblanc (FRA) | 58 |
| 20 | Paul Lemeteyer (FRA) | DNF |

France C
| No. | Rider | Pos. |
|---|---|---|
| 21 | André Bayssière (FRA) | 22 |
| 22 | Jean-Louis Bodin (FRA) | 59 |
| 23 | Jacques Cadiou (FRA) | DNF |
| 24 | André Desvages (FRA) | DNF |
| 25 | Francis Ducreux (FRA) | DNF |
| 26 | Jean Dumont (FRA) | 21 |
| 27 | Maurice Izier (FRA) | 43 |
| 28 | Désiré Letort (FRA) | DNF |
| 29 | Henri Rabaute (FRA) | DNF |
| 30 | Christian Robini (FRA) | DNF |

Germany
| No. | Rider | Pos. |
|---|---|---|
| 31 | Siegfried Adler (FRG) | DNF |
| 32 | Winfried Bölke (FRG) | DNF |
| 33 | Peter Glemser (FRG) | DNF |
| 34 | Winfried Gottschalk (FRG) | DNF |
| 35 | Klemens Grossimlinghaus (FRG) | DNF |
| 36 | Karl-Heinz Kunde (FRG) | DNF |
| 37 | Dieter Puschel (FRG) | 36 |
| 38 | Ernst Streng (FRG) | DNF |
| 39 | Herbert Wilde (FRG) | 44 |
| 40 | Rolf Wolfshohl (FRG) | 6 |

Belgium A
| No. | Rider | Pos. |
|---|---|---|
| 41 | Frans Brands (BEL) | 34 |
| 42 | Jos Huysmans (BEL) | 32 |
| 43 | Willy In 't Ven (BEL) | 57 |
| 44 | Marcel Maes (BEL) | 49 |
| 45 | Georges Pintens (BEL) | 12 |
| 46 | André Poppe (BEL) | 14 |
| 47 | Edward Sels (BEL) | DNF |
| 48 | Daniel Van Ryckeghem (BEL) | 46 |
| 49 | Herman Van Springel (BEL) | 2 |
| 50 | Edward Weckx (BEL) | 53 |

Belgium B
| No. | Rider | Pos. |
|---|---|---|
| 51 | Ferdinand Bracke (BEL) | 3 |
| 52 | Wilfried David (BEL) | DNF |
| 53 | Erik De Vlaeminck (BEL) | 51 |
| 54 | Walter Godefroot (BEL) | 20 |
| 55 | Antoon Houbrechts (BEL) | 16 |
| 56 | Eric Leman (BEL) | 52 |
| 57 | Jean Monteyne (BEL) | 47 |
| 58 | Victor Nuelant (BEL) | 54 |
| 59 | Georges Vandenberghe (BEL) | 18 |
| 60 | Remy Van Vreckom (BEL) | 60 |

Spain
| No. | Rider | Pos. |
|---|---|---|
| 61 | Carlos Echeverría (ESP) | 29 |
| 62 | Sebastián Elorza (ESP) | 38 |
| 63 | Andrés Gandarias (ESP) | 9 |
| 64 | Antonio Gómez del Moral (ESP) | 11 |
| 65 | Aurelio González Puente (ESP) | 13 |
| 66 | Julio Jiménez (ESP) | 30 |
| 67 | José Manuel Lasa (ESP) | DNF |
| 68 | Vicente López Carril (ESP) | 23 |
| 69 | José Pérez Francés (ESP) | DNF |
| 70 | Gregorio San Miguel (ESP) | 4 |

Great Britain
| No. | Rider | Pos. |
|---|---|---|
| 71 | Robert Addy (GBR) | DNF |
| 72 | John Clarey (GBR) | 63 |
| 73 | Vin Denson (GBR) | 62 |
| 74 | Derek Green (GBR) | DNF |
| 75 | Derek Harrison (GBR) | DNF |
| 76 | Barry Hoban (GBR) | 33 |
| 77 | Colin Lewis (GBR) | DNF |
| 78 | Arthur Metcalfe (GBR) | DNF |
| 79 | Hugh Porter (GBR) | DNF |
| 80 | Michael Wright (GBR) | 28 |

Italy
| No. | Rider | Pos. |
|---|---|---|
| 81 | Severini Andreoli (ITA) | DNF |
| 82 | Franco Bitossi (ITA) | 8 |
| 83 | Carlo Chiappano (ITA) | 25 |
| 84 | Ugo Colombo (ITA) | 10 |
| 85 | Mino Denti (ITA) | 61 |
| 86 | Pietro Guerra (ITA) | DNF |
| 87 | Adriano Passuello (ITA) | 24 |
| 88 | Silvano Schiavon (ITA) | 15 |
| 89 | Flaviano Vicentini (ITA) | 19 |
| 90 | Italo Zilioli (ITA) | DNF |

Netherlands
| No. | Rider | Pos. |
|---|---|---|
| 91 | Eddy Beugels (NED) | 55 |
| 92 | Arie den Hartog (NED) | 26 |
| 93 | Evert Dolman (NED) | 56 |
| 94 | Jan Janssen (NED) | 1 |
| 95 | Henk Nijdam (NED) | DNF |
| 96 | Harm Ottenbros (NED) | DNF |
| 97 | Wim Schepers (NED) | DNF |
| 98 | Jos van der Vleuten (NED) | DNF |
| 99 | Gerard Vianen (NED) | DNF |
| 100 | Huub Zilverberg (NED) | DNF |

Switzerland/Luxembourg
| No. | Rider | Pos. |
|---|---|---|
| 101 | Francis Blanc (SUI) | DNF |
| 102 | Karl Brand (SUI) | 35 |
| 103 | Robert Hagmann (SUI) | DNF |
| 104 | Albert Herger (SUI) | DNF |
| 105 | Josy Johanns (LUX) | DNF |
| 106 | Paul Köchli (SUI) | DNF |
| 107 | Johny Schleck (LUX) | DNF |
| 108 | Edy Schütz (LUX) | DNF |
| 109 | Roland Smaniotto (LUX) | DNF |
| 110 | Willy Spuhler (SUI) | 39 |

=== By rider ===
Legend
| No. | Starting number worn by the rider during the Tour |
| Pos. | Position in the general classification |
| DNF | Denotes a rider who did not finish |

| No. | Name | Nationality | Team | Pos. | Ref |
|---|---|---|---|---|---|
| 1 | Roger Pingeon | France | France A | 5 | |
| 2 | Jean-Pierre Genet | France | France A | 41 | |
| 3 | Bernard Guyot | France | France A | 27 | |
| 4 | Jean Jourden | France | France A | DNF | |
| 5 | Anatole Novak | France | France A | 50 | |
| 6 | Raymond Poulidor | France | France A | DNF | |
| 7 | Christian Raymond | France | France A | 45 | |
| 8 | Raymond Riotte | France | France A | DNF | |
| 9 | José Samyn | France | France A | DNF | |
| 10 | Jean Stablinski | France | France A | DNF | |
| 11 | Lucien Aimar | France | France B | 7 | |
| 12 | Gilbert Bellone | France | France B | 40 | |
| 13 | Serge Bolley | France | France B | 48 | |
| 14 | Georges Chappe | France | France B | 42 | |
| 15 | Jean-Pierre Ducasse | France | France B | 31 | |
| 16 | Fernand Etter | France | France B | DNF | |
| 17 | Michel Grain | France | France B | 37 | |
| 18 | Charly Grosskost | France | France B | 17 | |
| 19 | Jean-Marie Leblanc | France | France B | 58 | |
| 20 | Paul Lemeteyer | France | France B | DNF | |
| 21 | André Bayssière | France | France C | 22 | |
| 22 | Jean-Louis Bodin | France | France C | 59 | |
| 23 | Jacques Cadiou | France | France C | DNF | |
| 24 | André Desvages | France | France C | DNF | |
| 25 | Francis Ducreux | France | France C | DNF | |
| 26 | Jean Dumont | France | France C | 21 | |
| 27 | Maurice Izier | France | France C | 43 | |
| 28 | Désiré Letort | France | France C | DNF | |
| 29 | Henri Rabaute | France | France C | DNF | |
| 30 | Christian Robini | France | France C | DNF | |
| 31 | Siegfried Adler | West Germany | Germany | DNF | |
| 32 | Winfried Bölke | West Germany | Germany | DNF | |
| 33 | Peter Glemser | West Germany | Germany | DNF | |
| 34 | Winfried Gottschalk | West Germany | Germany | DNF | |
| 35 | Klemens Großimlinghaus | West Germany | Germany | DNF | |
| 36 | Karl-Heinz Kunde | West Germany | Germany | DNF | |
| 37 | Dieter Puschel | West Germany | Germany | 36 | |
| 38 | Ernst Streng | West Germany | Germany | DNF | |
| 39 | Herbert Wilde | West Germany | Germany | 44 | |
| 40 | Rolf Wolfshohl | West Germany | Germany | 6 | |
| 41 | Frans Brands | Belgium | Belgium A | 34 | |
| 42 | Jos Huysmans | Belgium | Belgium A | 32 | |
| 43 | Willy In 't Ven | Belgium | Belgium A | 57 | |
| 44 | Marcel Maes | Belgium | Belgium A | 49 | |
| 45 | Georges Pintens | Belgium | Belgium A | 12 | |
| 46 | André Poppe | Belgium | Belgium A | 14 | |
| 47 | Edward Sels | Belgium | Belgium A | DNF | |
| 48 | Daniel Van Ryckeghem | Belgium | Belgium A | 46 | |
| 49 | Herman Van Springel | Belgium | Belgium A | 2 | |
| 50 | Edouard Weckx | Belgium | Belgium A | 53 | |
| 51 | Ferdinand Bracke | Belgium | Belgium B | 3 | |
| 52 | Wilfried David | Belgium | Belgium B | DNF | |
| 53 | Erik De Vlaeminck | Belgium | Belgium B | 51 | |
| 54 | Walter Godefroot | Belgium | Belgium B | 20 | |
| 55 | Antoon Houbrechts | Belgium | Belgium B | 16 | |
| 56 | Eric Leman | Belgium | Belgium B | 52 | |
| 57 | Jean Monteyne | Belgium | Belgium B | 47 | |
| 58 | Victor Nuelant | Belgium | Belgium B | 54 | |
| 59 | Georges Vandenberghe | Belgium | Belgium B | 18 | |
| 60 | Remi Van Vreckom | Belgium | Belgium B | 60 | |
| 61 | Carlos Echeverría | Spain | Spain | 29 | |
| 62 | Sebastián Elorza | Spain | Spain | 38 | |
| 63 | Andrés Gandarias | Spain | Spain | 9 | |
| 64 | Antonio Gómez del Moral | Spain | Spain | 11 | |
| 65 | Aurelio González Puente | Spain | Spain | 13 | |
| 66 | Julio Jiménez | Spain | Spain | 30 | |
| 67 | José Manuel Lasa | Spain | Spain | DNF | |
| 68 | Vicente López Carril | Spain | Spain | 23 | |
| 69 | José Pérez Francés | Spain | Spain | DNF | |
| 70 | Gregorio San Miguel | Spain | Spain | 4 | |
| 71 | Robert Addy | Great Britain | Great Britain | DNF | |
| 72 | John Clarey | Great Britain | Great Britain | 63 | |
| 73 | Vin Denson | Great Britain | Great Britain | 62 | |
| 74 | Derek Green | Great Britain | Great Britain | DNF | |
| 75 | Derek Harrison | Great Britain | Great Britain | DNF | |
| 76 | Barry Hoban | Great Britain | Great Britain | 33 | |
| 77 | Colin Lewis | Great Britain | Great Britain | DNF | |
| 78 | Arthur Metcalfe | Great Britain | Great Britain | DNF | |
| 79 | Hugh Porter | Great Britain | Great Britain | DNF | |
| 80 | Michael Wright | Great Britain | Great Britain | 28 | |
| 81 | Severini Andreoli | Italy | Italy | DNF | |
| 82 | Franco Bitossi | Italy | Italy | 8 | |
| 83 | Carlo Chiappano | Italy | Italy | 25 | |
| 84 | Ugo Colombo | Italy | Italy | 10 | |
| 85 | Mino Denti | Italy | Italy | 61 | |
| 86 | Pietro Guerra | Italy | Italy | DNF | |
| 87 | Adriano Passuello | Italy | Italy | 24 | |
| 88 | Silvano Schiavon | Italy | Italy | 15 | |
| 89 | Flaviano Vicentini | Italy | Italy | 19 | |
| 90 | Italo Zilioli | Italy | Italy | DNF | |
| 91 | Eddy Beugels | Netherlands | Netherlands | 55 | |
| 92 | Arie den Hartog | Netherlands | Netherlands | 26 | |
| 93 | Evert Dolman | Netherlands | Netherlands | 56 | |
| 94 | Jan Janssen | Netherlands | Netherlands | 1 | |
| 95 | Henk Nijdam | Netherlands | Netherlands | DNF | |
| 96 | Harm Ottenbros | Netherlands | Netherlands | DNF | |
| 97 | Wim Schepers | Netherlands | Netherlands | DNF | |
| 98 | Jos van der Vleuten | Netherlands | Netherlands | DNF | |
| 99 | Gerard Vianen | Netherlands | Netherlands | DNF | |
| 100 | Huub Zilverberg | Netherlands | Netherlands | DNF | |
| 101 | Francis Blanc | Switzerland | Switzerland/Luxembourg | DNF | |
| 102 | Karl Brand | Switzerland | Switzerland/Luxembourg | 35 | |
| 103 | Robert Hagmann | Switzerland | Switzerland/Luxembourg | DNF | |
| 104 | Albert Herger | Switzerland | Switzerland/Luxembourg | DNF | |
| 105 | Josef Johanns | Luxembourg | Switzerland/Luxembourg | DNF | |
| 106 | Paul Köchli | Switzerland | Switzerland/Luxembourg | DNF | |
| 107 | Johny Schleck | Luxembourg | Switzerland/Luxembourg | DNF | |
| 108 | Edy Schütz | Luxembourg | Switzerland/Luxembourg | DNF | |
| 109 | Roland Smaniotto | Luxembourg | Switzerland/Luxembourg | DNF | |
| 110 | Willy Spuhler | Switzerland | Switzerland/Luxembourg | 39 | |
