= 1996 UCI Road World Championships – Men's road race =

Men's Individual Road Race
1996 UCI Road World Championships
- Rainbow jersey

Race details
- Dates: 13 October 1996
- Stages: 1
- Distance: 252 km (157 mi)
- Winning time: 6h 23' 50"

Results
	Winner	Johan Museeuw (BEL)	(Belgium)
	Second	Mauro Gianetti (SUI)	(Switzerland)
	Third	Michele Bartoli (ITA)	(Italy)

The men's road race at the 1996 UCI Road World Championships was the 63rd edition of the event. The race took place on Sunday 13 October 1996 in Lugano, Switzerland. The race was won by Johan Museeuw of Belgium.

== Final classification ==
General classification (1–10)

Rank	Rider	Time
1st place, gold medalist(s)	Johan Museeuw (BEL)	6h 23' 50"
2nd place, silver medalist(s)	Mauro Gianetti (SUI)	+ 1"
3rd place, bronze medalist(s)	Michele Bartoli (ITA)	+ 29"
4	Axel Merckx (BEL)	+ 29"
5	Richard Virenque (FRA)	+ 30"
6	Andrea Tafi (ITA)	+ 30"
7	Laurent Jalabert (FRA)	+ 1' 26"
8	Davide Rebellin (ITA)	+ 1' 26"
9	Tony Rominger (SUI)	+ 1' 26"
10	Bjarne Riis (DEN)	+ 1' 26"
