= Derek Green =

Derek or Derrick Green may refer to:

== Politics and law ==
- Derek Green (judge), Canadian judge
- Derek S. Green, Philadelphia city councilmember

== Musicians ==
- Derrick Green, American musician
- Derek Green (music), music executive and founder of China Records

== Sportsmen ==
- Derek Green (cyclist), British cyclist
- Derrick Green (American football)
- Derek Green (figure skating), figure skater who competed in the 2008 Canadian Figure Skating Championships
- Derek Green (speedway rider), speedway rider who competed in the 1989 British Speedway League
