= Bonanomi =

Bonanomi is an Italian surname. Notable people with the surname include:

- Marco Bonanomi (born 1985), Italian racing driver
- Roberta Bonanomi (born 1966), Italian cyclist
