= Herger =

Herger is a surname. Notable people with the surname include:

- Albert Herger (1942–2009), Swiss racing cyclist
- Alfred D. Herger (born 1942), Puerto Rican television presenter and psychologist
- Marc Herger (born 1997), swiss politician (SVP)
- Wally Herger (born 1945), American politician

== See also ==
- Berger
