= Mauro Gianetti =

Swiss cyclist

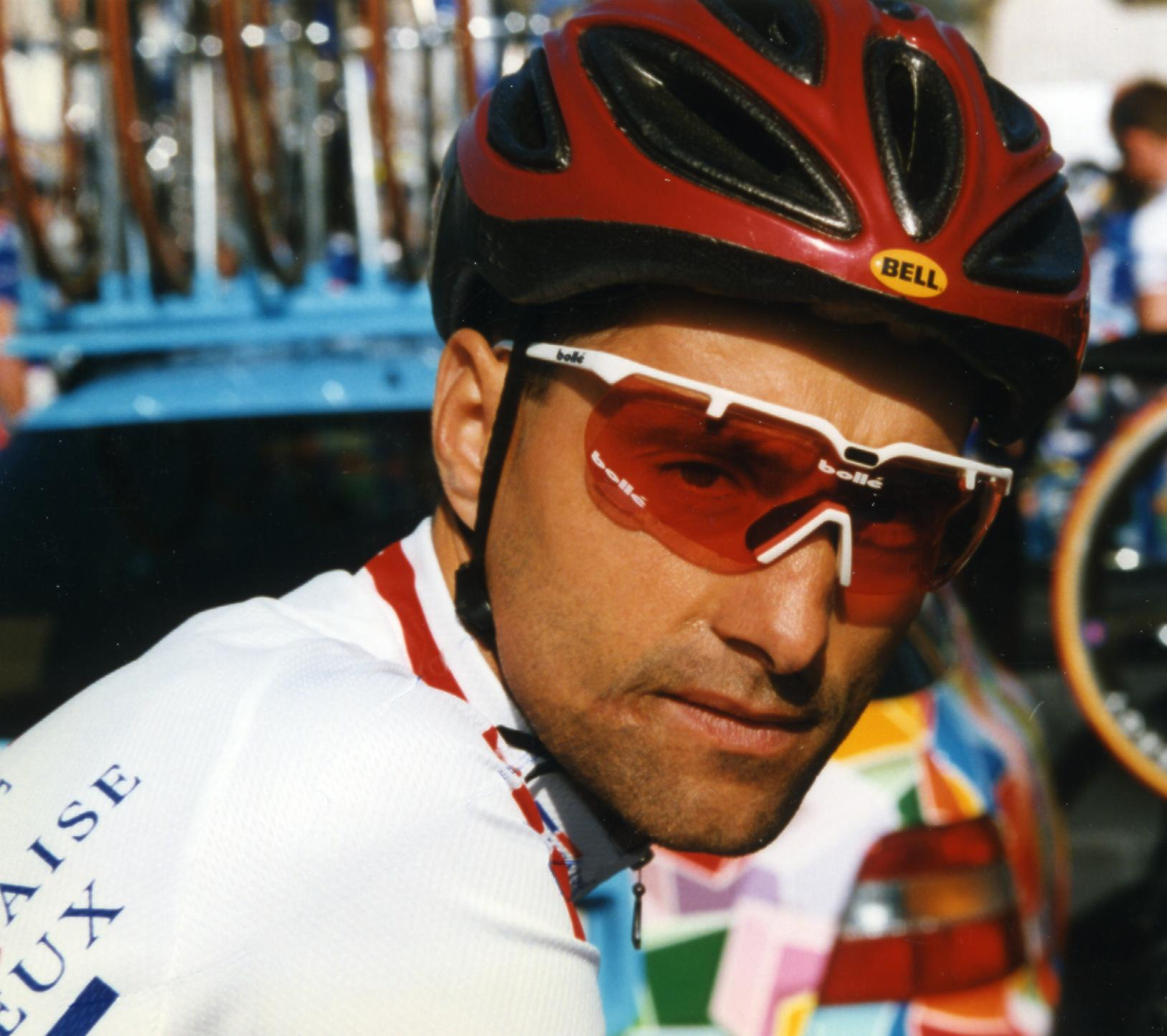
- Gianetti in 1997

Personal information
- Full name: Mauro Gianetti
- Born: 16 March 1964 (age 62) Lugano, Switzerland
- Height: 1.75 m (5 ft 9 in)
- Weight: 62 kg (137 lb; 9 st 11 lb)

Cycling career
- Sport: Cycling
- Discipline: Road
- Role: Rider & directeur sportif

Professional teams
- 1986: Cilo–Aufina
- 1987: Paini–Bottecchia–Sidi
- 1988: Weinmann–La Suisse–SMM Uster
- 1989–1991: Helvetia–La Suisse
- 1992–1993: Lotus–Festina
- 1994: Mapei–CLAS
- 1995–1996: Team Polti
- 1997–1998: Française des Jeux
- 1999–2000: Vini Caldirola
- 2001–2002: Team Coast

Managerial teams
- 2002–2003: Tacconi Sport
- 2004–2011: Saunier Duval–Prodir
- 2017-Present: UAE Team Emirates

Major wins
- One-day races and Classics Liège–Bastogne–Liège (1995) Amstel Gold Race (1995) Milano–Torino (1990) Japan Cup (1996)
Medal record
Representing Switzerland
Men's road bicycle racing
World Championships
Silver medal – second place	1996 Lugano	Road race

Mauro Gianetti (born 16 March 1964 in Lugano) is a Swiss former professional road cyclist and later directeur sportif. Gianetti was employed as team manager for the Saunier Duval–Prodir cycling team throughout its existence between 2004 and 2011. In 2016, Gianetti coordinated the acquisition of Lampre-Merida's UCI WorldTeam license as part of a project backed by TJ Sport Consultation. After difficulties arose with TJ Sport, Giuseppe Saronni and Gianetti secured the backing of the United Arab Emirates and formed the current UAE Team Emirates UCI WorldTeam. Gianetti currently sits on the Board of Directors of UAE Team Emirates and serves as the Team Principal and CEO.

Several riders were sanctioned for doping violations that occurred during his tenure as directeur sportif at Saunier Duval, including Riccardo Riccò and Juan José Cobo.

With over 30 professional victories, Gianetti's biggest career accomplishments as a rider include winning the 1995 Liège–Bastogne–Liège and Amstel Gold Race and representing Switzerland at the 2000 Summer Olympics.

His son Noé Gianetti is also a former professional cyclist.

== Doping incident ==
During the 1998 Tour de Romandie, Gianetti abandoned during a stage and later became unconscious. He was taken to Lausanne University Hospital where he remained on the intensive care ward for 10 days, as his life was in danger. Initially, doctors suspected an infection, but all tests came back negative. Two doctors then suspected that Gianetti had been transfused with a perfluorocarbon emulsion, to increase the oxygen-carrying capacity of his blood. This was reported to the authorities and an investigation was opened. According to legal documents and witness testimony uncovered by Radio France, Gianetti blocked the public release of this investigation by filing for damages when he discovered the identities of the whistleblower doctors who reported him. Gianetti filed for 900,000 Swiss francs from Dr Jean-Pierre Randin and 3 million Swiss francs from Dr. Gérald Grémion. In the 2025 Radio France report, Grémion confirmed that the financial pressure forced him to negotiate with Gianetti's lawyer to reach an agreement. “In exchange, I had to promise never to speak publicly about this person again,” Grémion told Radio France. “You could say that my silence was bought.”

== Major results ==
1981
3rd Road race, National Road Championships
1982
1st Road race, National Junior Road Championships
1983
2nd Gran Premio di Chiasso
1984
1st Stage 5b Settimana Ciclistica Bergamasca
1985
2nd Circuito Belvedere
1986
1st GP Lugano
5th Tour du Nord-Ouest
1987
7th Giro dell'Emilia
9th Coppa Placci
10th Giro di Toscana
1988
5th Road race, UCI Road World Championships
7th Overall Tour de Suisse
9th Züri-Metzgete
10th Giro dell'Emilia
10th Coppa Sabatini
1989
1st Tour du Nord-Ouest
2nd Overall Kellogg's Tour of Britain

1st Stage 4

2nd Kuurne–Brussels–Kuurne
3rd Giro dell'Emilia
5th Amstel Gold Race
5th Trofeo Pantalica
7th Paris–Camembert
1990
1st Milano–Torino
1st Coppa Placci
3rd Grand Prix de Fourmies
5th Overall Settimana Internazionale Coppi e Bartali
8th Giro dell'Emilia
10th Rund um den Henninger Turm
1991
4th GP des Amériques
5th Milano–Torino
7th Coppa Sabatini
7th Giro dell'Emilia
1992
3rd Grand Prix de Fourmies
5th Grand Prix d'Isbergues
7th Trofeo Laigueglia
1993
2nd Trofeo Melinda
6th Giro del Veneto
1994
1st Chur–Arosa
2nd Milano–Torino
9th Overall Tour de Suisse
9th Giro di Lombardia
9th Giro dell'Emilia
9th Coppa Sabatini
1995
1st Liège–Bastogne–Liège
1st Amstel Gold Race
2nd Overall Escalada a Montjuïc

1st Stage 1b (ITT)

2nd Klasika Primavera
3rd Overall UCI Road World Cup
3rd Japan Cup
3rd Subida a Txitxarro
4th Road race, UCI Road World Championships
5th Milano–Torino
7th Overall Tour of the Basque Country
1996
1st Japan Cup
1st Klasika Primavera
1st Chur–Arosa
2nd Road race, UCI Road World Championships
2nd Overall Escalada a Montjuïc

1st Stage 1a

3rd Overall Critérium International

1st Stage 2

3rd Liège–Bastogne–Liège
3rd Giro del Piemonte
3rd Giro del Veneto
4th Overall Tour of the Basque Country
4th La Flèche Wallonne
5th Overall Tour de Romandie
6th Overall UCI Road World Cup
6th Subida a Urkiola
8th Giro di Lombardia
1997
1st Paris–Camembert
1st Polymultipliée de l'Hautil
2nd Trophée des Grimpeurs
3rd Japan Cup
3rd Rund um den Henninger Turm
5th Amstel Gold Race
6th Overall Critérium International
7th Grand Prix de Fourmies
10th Liège–Bastogne–Liège
1998
7th Liège–Bastogne–Liège
1999
1st Trofeo Melinda
1st Wartenberg Rundfahrt
3rd Road race, National Road Championships
6th Giro del Friuli
7th Overall Settimana Internazionale Coppi e Bartali
2001
1st Overall Tour of Japan

1st Stage 3

5th Road race, National Road Championships
5th Sparkassen Giro Bochum
6th Liège–Bastogne–Liège
9th La Flèche Wallonne
2002
2nd Tour de Berne
4th Road race, National Road Championships
6th Luk-Cup Bühl
6th Grand Prix de Wallonie

== After retirement ==
Gianetti became assistant director of Dante Lam, and helped to film the Milan leg of the Taiwanese movie To The Fore.
