= Marcel Maes =

Belgian cyclist

Personal information
- Born: 19 December 1944 Deurle, Belgium
- Died: 10 April 1997 (aged 52) Wondelgem, Belgium

Cycling career
- Sport: Cycling
- Discipline: Road
- Role: Rider

Professional teams
- 1967–1969: Willem II-Gazelle
- 1970: Siriki-Munk
- 1970: Goldor-Fryns

Major wins
- Peace Race (1967)

Marcel Maes (19 December 1944 in Deurle – 10 April 1997 in Wondelgem) was a Belgian cyclist. He won the Peace Race in 1967. This was Maes's only professional victory. He rode in the 1968 Tour de France, finishing in 49th place.
