= Emīlija Sonka =

Latvian cyclist

Personal information
- Full name: Emīlija Sonka
- Born: 4 November 1939 (age 86) Kuldīga, Latvia

Cycling career
- Sport: Cycling
- Disciplines: Road, track
- Role: Rider
Medal record
Representing Soviet Union
Women's road cycling
UCI Road World Championships
Gold medal – first place	1964	Road race

Emīlija Sonka (born 4 November 1939 in Kuldīga, Latvia) is a former track and road cyclist from Latvia. She won the gold medal at the 1964 Road World Championships in the road race (representing USSR).
