= 1966 UCI Road World Championships =

- Venue: Nürburgring, West Germany
- Date: 28 August 1966
- Coordinates: 50°20′32″N 6°57′8″E

The 1966 UCI Road World Championships took place on 28 August 1966 at the Nürburgring, West Germany.

In the same period, the 1966 UCI Track Cycling World Championships were organized in Frankfurt.

== Results ==
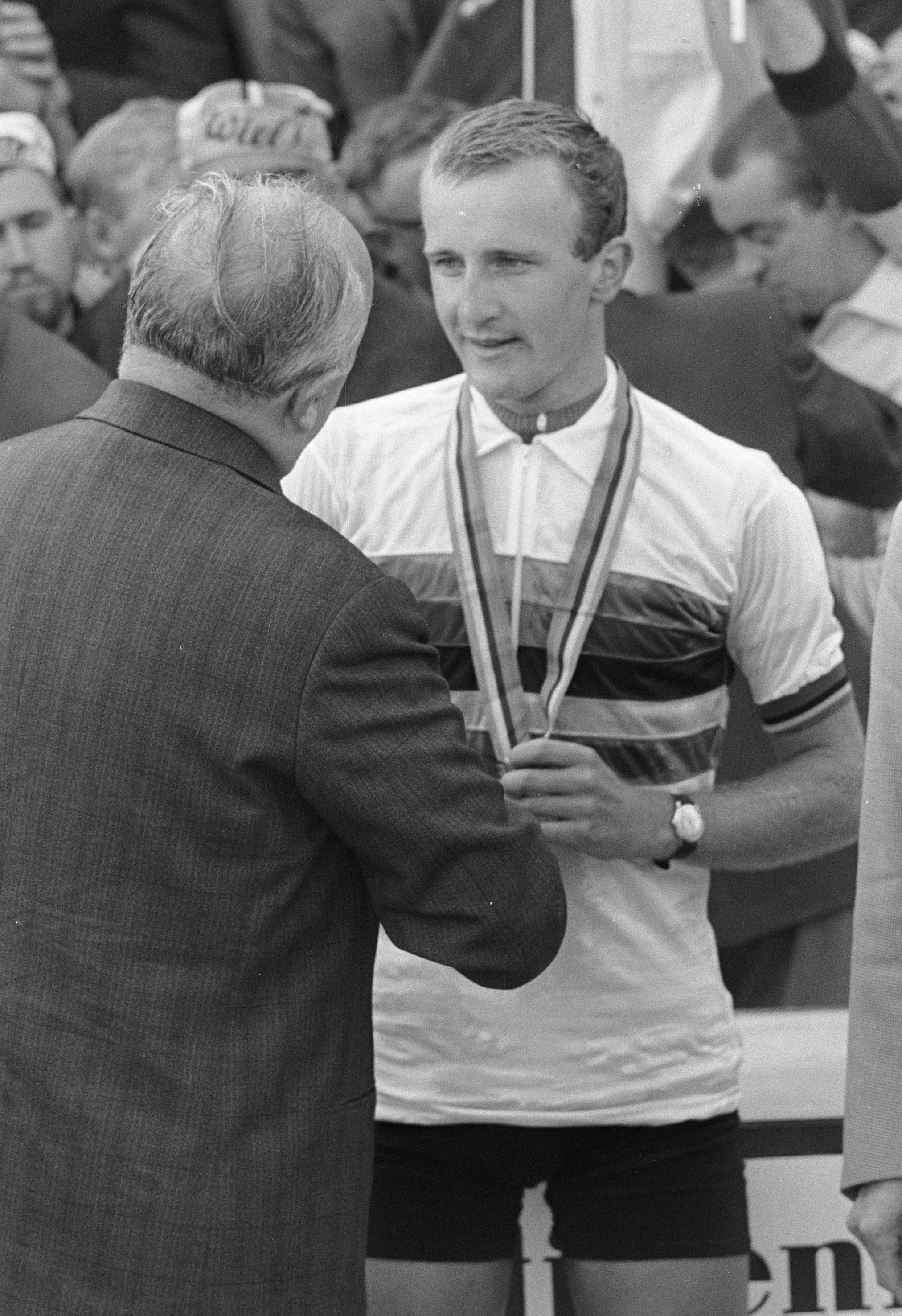
Evert Dolman receiving his winner prize for Amateurs' road race.

Race:	Gold:	Time	Silver:	Time	Bronze :	Time
Men
Men's road race	Rudi Altig; West Germany	7 h 21 min 10s	Jacques Anquetil; France	m.t.	Raymond Poulidor; France	m.t.
Amateurs' road race	Evert Dolman; Netherlands	-	Les West; Great Britain	-	Willy Skibby; Denmark	-
Team time trial	Denmark; Verner Blaudzun; Jørgen Hansen; Ole Hojlund Pedersen; Flemming Wisborg	-	Netherlands; Eddy Beugels; Tiemen Groen; Harry Steevens; Rini Wagtmans	-	Italy; Attilio Benfatto; Luciano Dalla Bona; Mino Denti; Pietro Guerra	-
Women
Women's road race	Yvonne Reynders; Belgium	-	Keetie van Oosten-Hage; Netherlands	-	Aino Puronen; Soviet Union	-

== Medal table ==
Rank	Nation	Gold	Silver	Bronze	Total
1	Netherlands (NED)	1	2	0	3
2	Denmark (DEN)	1	0	1	2
3	Belgium (BEL)	1	0	0	1
3	West Germany (FRG)	1	0	0	1
5	France (FRA)	0	1	1	2
6	Great Britain (GBR)	0	1	0	1
7	Italy (ITA)	0	0	1	1
7	Soviet Union (URS)	0	0	1	1
Totals (8 entries)		4	4	4	12
