= Francesca Galli =

Italian cyclist

Personal information
- Full name: Francesca Galli
- Born: 5 July 1960 (age 66) Desio, Italy

Cycling career
- Sport: Cycling
- Current team: retired

Major wins
- Trofeo Alfredo Binda-Comune di Cittiglio (1980); UCI Road Team Time Trial (1988)

Francesca Galli (born 5 July 1960 in Desio, Monza) is a retired racing cyclist from Italy. She was 7th in the World Road Race in 1979 and 4th in the following year. Her biggest achievement was winning the world title in the women's team time trial (1988), alongside Maria Canins, Roberta Bonanomi, and Monica Bandini. She came second the following year.
