= Gianfranco Contri =

Italian cyclist (born 1970)

Personal information
- Born: 27 April 1970 (age 56) Bologna, Italy

Cycling career
- Sport: Cycling
- Current team: Retired
- Discipline: Road
- Role: Rider
Medal record
Men's cycling
Representing Italy
Olympic Games
Silver medal – second place	1992 Barcelona	Team time trial

Gianfranco Contri (born 27 April 1970) is an Italian former road cyclist. He won the silver medal in the team time trial at the 1992 Summer Olympics.

== Major results ==
1987
1st Coppa San Bernardino
1988
1st Team time trial, UCI Junior World Road Championships
1991
1st Team time trial, UCI Road World Championships
1st Team time trial, Mediterranean Games
1992
1st Time trial, National Amateur Road Championships
1st Duo Normand (with Luca Colombo)
2nd Team time trial, Summer Olympics
1993
1st Team time trial, UCI Road World Championships
1st Team time trial, Mediterranean Games
1994
1st Team time trial, UCI Road World Championships
1st Duo Normand (with Cristian Salvato)
1st Coppa Città di Melzo
3rd Overall Olympia's Tour
1996
3rd Overall Olympia's Tour

1st Stage 7
