= Cristian Salvato =

Italian racing cyclist

Personal information
- Born: 18 August 1971 (age 55) Campo San Martino, Italy

Cycling career
- Sport: Cycling
- Current team: Retired
- Discipline: Road
- Role: Rider
- Rider type: Time Trialist

Professional teams
- 1995–1997: Refin
- 1998–1999: Team Polti
- 2000–2001: Liquigas–Pata

Cristian Salvato (born 18 August 1971, in Campo San Martino) is a former Italian racing cyclist.

== Major results ==
1989
1st Junior World Team Time Trial Championships (with Davide Rebellin, Rossano Brasi and Andrea Peron)
1991
1st Mediterranean Games Team Time Trial (with Flavio Anastasia, Luca Colombo and Gianfranco Contri)
1993
1st UCI World Team Time Trial Championships (with Gianfranco Contri, Rosario Fina and Rossano Brasi)
1st Mediterranean Games Team Time Trial (with Gianfranco Contri, Luca Colombo and Francesco Rossano)
1994
1st UCI World Team Time Trial Championships (with Gianfranco Contri, Luca Colombo and Dario Andriotto)
1st Duo Normand (with Gianfranco Contri)
1997
3rd National Time Trial Championships
