= Monica Bandini =

Italian cyclist (1964–2021)

Personal information
- Full name: Monica Bandini
- Born: November 16, 1964 Faenza, Italy
- Died: April 19, 2021 (aged 56) Forlì, Italy

Cycling career
- Sport: Cycling

Major wins
- UCI Team Time Trial (1988)

Monica Bandini (November 16, 1964 – April 19, 2021) was an Italian racing cyclist. Her biggest achievement in the sport was winning the world title in the women's team time trial (1988), alongside Maria Canins, Roberta Bonanomi, and Francesca Galli.
