= 1995 Liège–Bastogne–Liège =

Race details
- Dates: 16 April 1995
- Stages: 1
- Distance: 261.5 km (162.5 mi)
- Winning time: 6h 38' 25"

Results
	Winner	Mauro Gianetti (SUI)	(Polti–Granarolo–Santini)
	Second	Gianni Bugno (ITA)	(MG Maglificio–Technogym)
	Third	Michele Bartoli (ITA)	(Mercatone Uno–Saeco)

The 1995 Liège–Bastogne–Liège was the 81st edition of the Liège–Bastogne–Liège cycle race held on 16 April 1995. The race, starting in Liège and finishing in Ans, was won by Mauro Gianetti of the Polti team.

== General classification ==
Final general classification

Rank	Rider	Team	Time
1	Mauro Gianetti (SUI)	Polti–Granarolo–Santini	6h 38' 25"
2	Gianni Bugno (ITA)	MG Maglificio–Technogym	+ 15"
3	Michele Bartoli (ITA)	Mercatone Uno–Saeco	+ 15"
4	Laurent Jalabert (FRA)	ONCE	+ 15"
5	Francesco Casagrande (ITA)	Mercatone Uno–Saeco	+ 1' 24"
6	Lance Armstrong (USA)	Motorola	+ 3' 04"
7	Claudio Chiappucci (ITA)	Carrera Jeans–Tassoni	+ 4' 45"
8	Rolf Sørensen (DEN)	MG Maglificio–Technogym	+ 4' 45"
9	Heinz Imboden (SUI)	Refin	+ 4' 45"
10	Maarten den Bakker (NED)	TVM–Polis Direct	+ 10' 10"
