= Tour de l'Avenir =

French road cycling stage race

Race details
- Date: August (men); September (women)
- Region: France
- English name: Tour of the Future
- Local name: Tour de l'Avenir (in French)
- Discipline: Road
- Competition: UCI Nations Cup
- Type: Stage race
- Organiser: Alpes Vélo
- Race director: Philippe Colliou
- Web site: tourdelavenir.com

History (men)
- First edition: 1961
- Editions: 62 (as of 2026)
- First winner: Guido De Rosso (ITA)
- Most wins: Sergei Sukhoruchenkov (URS) (2 wins)
- Most recent: Lorenzo Finn (ITA)

History (women)
- First edition: 2023
- First winner: Shirin van Anrooij (NED)
- Most recent: Isabella Holmgren (CAN)

Tour de l'Avenir (English: Tour of the Future) is a French road bicycle racing stage race, which started in 1961 as a race similar to the Tour de France and over much of the same course but for amateurs and for semi-professionals known as independents. Felice Gimondi, Joop Zoetemelk, Greg LeMond, Miguel Induráin, Laurent Fignon, Egan Bernal, and Tadej Pogačar won the Tour de l'Avenir and won 18 Tours de France, with an additional 10 podium placings between them. With the inclusion of Nairo Quintana, these eight riders have won 29 Grand Tours, with an additional 28 podium placings.

The race was created in 1961 by Jacques Marchand, the editor of L'Équipe, to attract teams from the Soviet Union and other communist nations that had no professional riders to enter the Tour de France.

Until 1967, it took place earlier the same day as some of the stages of the Tour de France and shared the latter part of each stage's route, but moved to September and a separate course from 1968 onwards. It became the Grand Prix de l'Avenir in 1970, the Trophée Peugeot de l'Avenir from 1972 to 1979 and the Tour de la Communauté Européenne from 1986 to 1990. It was restricted to amateurs from 1961 to 1980, before opening to professionals in 1981. After 1992, it was open to all riders who were less than 25 years old.

Since 2007 it is for riders aged 18 to 22 inclusive, and is held part of the UCI Nations Cup. National teams take part in the race rather than trade teams.

== Women ==
From 2023, a women's edition of the race (Tour de l'Avenir Femmes) was held following the men, taking place over 5 days. As with the men's race, national teams take part in the race.

== Winners ==
=== Men ===
Year	Country	Rider	Team
1961	Italy	Guido De Rosso	
1962	Spain	Antonio Gómez del Moral	
1963	France	André Zimmermann	
1964	Italy	Felice Gimondi	
1965	Spain	Mariano Díaz	
1966	Italy	Mino Denti	
1967	France	Christian Robini	
1968	France	Jean-Pierre Boulard	
1969	Netherlands	Joop Zoetemelk	
1970	France	Marcel Duchemin	
1971	France	Régis Ovion	
1972	Netherlands	Fedor den Hertog	
1973	Italy	Gianbattista Baronchelli	
1974	Spain	Enrique Martinez Heredia	
1975	No race		
1976	Sweden	Sven-Åke Nilsson	
1977	Belgium	Eddy Schepers	
1978	Soviet Union	Sergei Sukhoruchenkov	
1979	Soviet Union	Sergei Sukhoruchenkov	
1980	Colombia	Alfonso Florez	
1981	France	Pascal Simon	Peugeot–Esso–Michelin
1982	United States	Greg LeMond	Renault–Elf
1983	East Germany	Olaf Ludwig	East Germany (national team)
1984	France	Charly Mottet	Renault–Elf
1985	Colombia	Martín Ramírez	Café de Colombia–Varta–Mavic
1986	Spain	Miguel Induráin	Reynolds
1987	France	Marc Madiot	Système U
1988	France	Laurent Fignon	Système U
1989	France	Pascal Lino	RMO
1990	Belgium	Johan Bruyneel	Lotto–Superclub
1991	No race		
1992	France	Hervé Garel	RMO–Onet
1993	France	Thomas Davy	Castorama
1994	Spain	Ángel Casero	Banesto
1995	France	Emmanuel Magnien	Castorama
1996	Spain	David Etxebarría	ONCE
1997	France	Laurent Roux	TVM–Farm Frites
1998	France	Christophe Rinero	Cofidis
1999	Spain	Unai Osa	Banesto
2000	Spain	Iker Flores	Euskaltel–Euskadi
2001	Russia	Denis Menchov	iBanesto.com
2002	Russia	Evgeni Petrov	Mapei–Quick-Step
2003	Spain	Egoi Martínez	Euskaltel–Euskadi
2004	France	Sylvain Calzati	R.A.G.T. Semences-MG Rover
2005	Denmark	Lars Bak	Team CSC
2006	Spain	Moisés Dueñas	Agritubel
2007	Netherlands	Bauke Mollema	Rabobank Continental Team
2008	Belgium	Jan Bakelants	Belgium (national team)
2009	France	Romain Sicard	France (national team)
2010	Colombia	Nairo Quintana	Colombia (national team)
2011	Colombia	Esteban Chaves	Colombia (national team)
2012	France	Warren Barguil	France (national team)
2013	Spain	Rubén Fernández	Spain (national team)
2014	Colombia	Miguel Ángel López	Colombia (national team)
2015	Spain	Marc Soler	Spain (national team)
2016	France	David Gaudu	France (national team)
2017	Colombia	Egan Bernal	Colombia (national team)
2018	Slovenia	Tadej Pogačar	Slovenia (national team)
2019	Norway	Tobias Foss	Norway (national team)
2020	No race due to COVID-19 pandemic		
2021	Norway	Tobias Halland Johannessen	Norway (national team)
2022	Belgium	Cian Uijtdebroeks	Belgium (national team)
2023	Mexico	Isaac del Toro	Mexico (national team)
2024	Great Britain	Joseph Blackmore	Great Britain (national team)
2025	France	Paul Seixas	France (national team)
2026	Italy	Lorenzo Finn	Red Bull–Bora–Hansgrohe Rookies

=== Women ===
Year	Country	Rider	Team
2023	Netherlands	Shirin van Anrooij	The Netherlands (national team)
2024	France	Marion Bunel	France (national team)
2025	Canada	Isabella Holmgren	Canada (national team)
