= Roberta Bonanomi =

Italian cyclist

Personal information
- Full name: Roberta Bonanomi
- Born: 15 October 1966 (age 60) Sotto il Monte, Bergamo, Italy

Cycling career
- Sport: Cycling
- Current team: Retired

Major wins
- UCI Team Time Trial (1988); Giro d'Italia Femminile (1989)

Roberta Bonanomi (born 15 October 1966) is a retired racing cyclist from Italy. She represented her native country at five Summer Olympics: 1984, 1988, 1992, 1996, and 2000. Her biggest achievements were winning the 1989 Giro d'Italia Femminile and the world title in the women's team time trial (1988), alongside Maria Canins, Monica Bandini, and Francesca Galli.

== Major results ==
1982

1st Road Race, National Junior Road Championships

1983
2nd Vertemate con Minoprio

1986
5th Vertemate con Minoprio

1987
3rd Pernod–Super Prestige
3rd Team Time Trial, UCI Road World Championships
5th Vertemate con Minoprio
10th Overall Tour of Norway

1988
1st Team Time Trial, UCI Road World Championships
4th Vertemate con Minoprio

1989
1st Overall Giro d'Italia Femminile
1st Overall Tour of Norway

1st Stage 5

2nd Team Time Trial, UCI Road World Championships
4th Vertemate con Minoprio

1990
1st GP Conad
2nd Vertemate con Minoprio

1991
1st Time Trial, National Road Championships
2nd Vertemate con Minoprio

1992
2nd Settimana di Bergamo

1993
3rd Team Time Trial, UCI Road World Championships

1994
1st Osio Sopra
1st Bagni di Lucca
2nd Overall Giro del Trentino Alto Adige - Südtirol
2nd Villafranca di Forlì Chrono
3rd Vertemate con Minoprio

1995
1st Stage 12 Grande Boucle Féminine Internationale
2nd Time Trial, National Road Championships
2nd Overall Masters Féminin

1st Stage 2

2nd Overall Giro della Toscana Int. Femminile
3rd Overall Giro d'Italia Femminile
6th Road Race, UCI Road World Championships

1996
4th Vertemate con Minoprio

1997
1st Stage 4 Giro del Trentino Alto Adige - Südtirol
3rd Time Trial, National Road Championships

1999
1st Hamilton City
5th La Flèche Wallonne

2000
1st Stage 5 Giro d'Italia Femminile
