= 1965 UCI Road World Championships =

- Location within Spain
- Venue: San Sebastián, Spain
- Date: 2-5 September 1965
- Coordinates: 43°19′17″N 1°59′8″W

The 1965 UCI Road World Championships took place from 2-5 September 1965 in San Sebastián, Spain.

In the same period, the 1965 UCI Track Cycling World Championships were also organized in San Sebastián.

== Results ==
Race:	Gold:	Time	Silver:	Time	Bronze:	Time
Men
Men's road race	Tom Simpson; Great Britain	6 h 39 min 19s	Rudi Altig; West Germany	m.t.	Roger Swerts; Belgium	+ 3 min 40s
Amateurs' road race	Jacques Botherel; France	-	José Manuel Lasa; Spain	-	Battista Monti; Italy	-
Team time trial	Italy; Pietro Guerra; Luciano Dalla Bona; Mino Denti; Giuseppe Soldi	-	Spain; Ventura Diaz Arrey; José Manuel López Rodríguez; José Manuel Lasa; Domingo Perurena	-	France; André Desvages; Gerard Swertvaeger; Henri Heintz; Claude Lechatelier	-
Women
Women's road race	Elisabeth Eichholz; East Germany	-	Yvonne Reynders; Belgium	-	Aino Puronen; Soviet Union	-

== Medal table ==
Rank	Nation	Gold	Silver	Bronze	Total
1	France (FRA)	1	0	1	2
1	Italy (ITA)	1	0	1	2
3	East Germany (GDR)	1	0	0	1
3	Great Britain (GBR)	1	0	0	1
5	Spain (ESP)	0	2	0	2
6	Belgium (BEL)	0	1	1	2
7	West Germany (FRG)	0	1	0	1
8	Soviet Union (URS)	0	0	1	1
Totals (8 entries)		4	4	4	12
