= Luciano Dalla Bona =

Italian cyclist

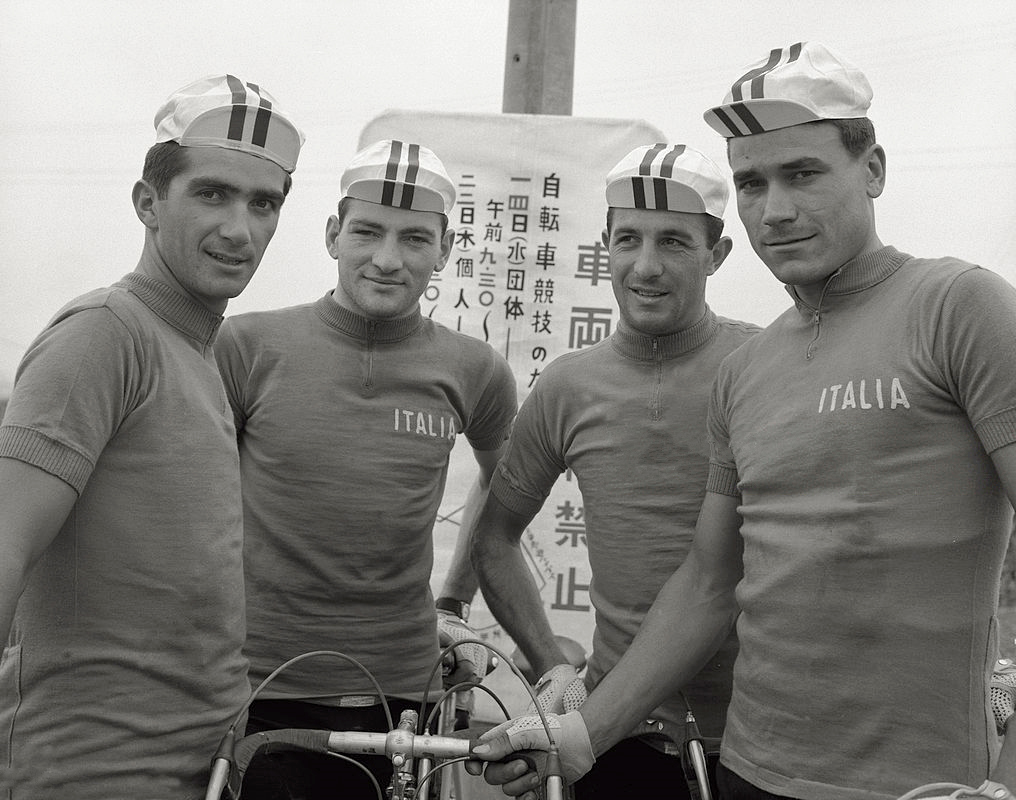
- Luciano Dalla Bona (right) at the 1964 Olympics

Personal information
- Full name: Luciano Dalla Bona
- Born: 8 November 1943 (age 82) Pressana, Italy
- Height: 1.78 m (5 ft 10 in)
- Weight: 76 kg (168 lb)

Cycling career
- Sport: Cycling
- Discipline: Road
- Role: Rider

Professional team
- Salvarani
Medal record
Representing Italy
Men's road cycling
Olympic Games
| Silver medal – second place | 1964 Tokyo | Team time trial |
World championships
| Gold medal – first place | 1964 Sallanches | Team time trial |
| Gold medal – first place | 1965 San Sebastián | Team time trial |
| Bronze medal – third place | 1966 Nürburgring | Team time trial |

Luciano Dalla Bona (born 8 November 1943) is a retired Italian road cyclist. Competing as amateur in the 100 km team time trial, he won an Olympics silver medal in 1964 and two world titles, in 1964 and 1965, finishing third in 1966. After that he turned professional and won one stage of the Tour of Italy in 1968. In 1966 he won Coppa Città di San Daniele.

He rode the Tour de France in 1967 and 1970. His younger brother Giovanni Dalla Bona was also a professional road cyclist.
