= 1964 UCI Road World Championships =

French road bicycle race

- Location within France
- Venue: Sallanches, France
- Date: 3–6 September 1964
- Coordinates: 45°56′14″N 6°37′58″E
- Events: 4

The 1964 UCI Road World Championships took place from 3 to 6 September 1964 in Sallanches, France.

In the same period, the 1964 UCI Track Cycling World Championships were organized in Paris.

== Results ==
Race:	Gold:	Time	Silver:	Time	Bronze:	Time
Men
Men's road race	Jan Janssen; Netherlands	7 h 35 min 52s	Vittorio Adorni; Italy	s.t.	Raymond Poulidor; France	s.t.
Amateurs' road race	Eddy Merckx; Belgium	4 h 39 min 10s	Willy Planckaert; Belgium	+0.27	Gösta Pettersson; Sweden	s.t.
100km team mountains race	Italy; Severino Andreoli; Luciano Dalla Bona; Pietro Guerra; Ferruccio Manza	2 h 07 min 20s	Spain; Juan García Such; José Ramón Goyeneche Bilbao; Ramón Sáez Marzo; Luis Pedro Santamarina	+3.47	Belgium; René Heuvelmans; Roland De Neve; Roland Van De Rijse; Albert Van Vlierberghe	+3.51
Women
Women's road race	Emīlija Sonka; Soviet Union	1 h 44 min 37s	Galina Yudina; Soviet Union	s.t.	Rosa Sels; Belgium	s.t.

== Medal table ==
Rank	Nation	Gold	Silver	Bronze	Total
1	Belgium (BEL)	1	1	2	4
2	Italy (ITA)	1	1	0	2
2	Soviet Union (URS)	1	1	0	2
4	Netherlands (NED)	1	0	0	1
5	Spain (ESP)	0	1	0	1
6	France (FRA)	0	0	1	1
6	Sweden (SWE)	0	0	1	1
Totals (7 entries)		4	4	4	12

== See also ==
- 1964 UCI Track Cycling World Championships
