= Willy Spuhler (cyclist) =

Swiss cyclist

Personal information
- Born: 9 October 1941 (age 85)

Cycling career
- Sport: Cycling
- Role: Rider

Willy Spuhler (born 9 October 1941) is a Swiss racing cyclist. He rode in the 1967 Tour de France.
