= Josef Johanns =

Luxembourgish cyclist

Personal information
- Born: 14 May 1944 (age 82)

Cycling career
- Sport: Cycling
- Role: Rider

Josef Johanns (born 14 May 1944) is a Luxembourgish racing cyclist. He rode in the 1968 Tour de France.
