= Christian Robini =

French cyclist

Personal information
- Born: January 11, 1946 Lantosque
- Died: September 29, 2001 Nice

Cycling career
- Sport: Cycling
- Discipline: Road
- Role: Rider

Professional teams
- 1968-1969: Mercier - BP - Hutchinson
- 1970: Frimatic - De Gribaldy

Major wins
- Tour de l'Avenir (1967)

Christian Robini (January 11, 1946 – September 29, 2001) was a French cyclist. In 1967, while an amateur, he won the Tour de l'Avenir. As a professional cyclist from 1968 to 1970, he participated in the Tour de France.

== Palmarès ==
1967

- Tour de l'Avenir
