= Ferruccio Manza =

Italian cyclist (born 1943)

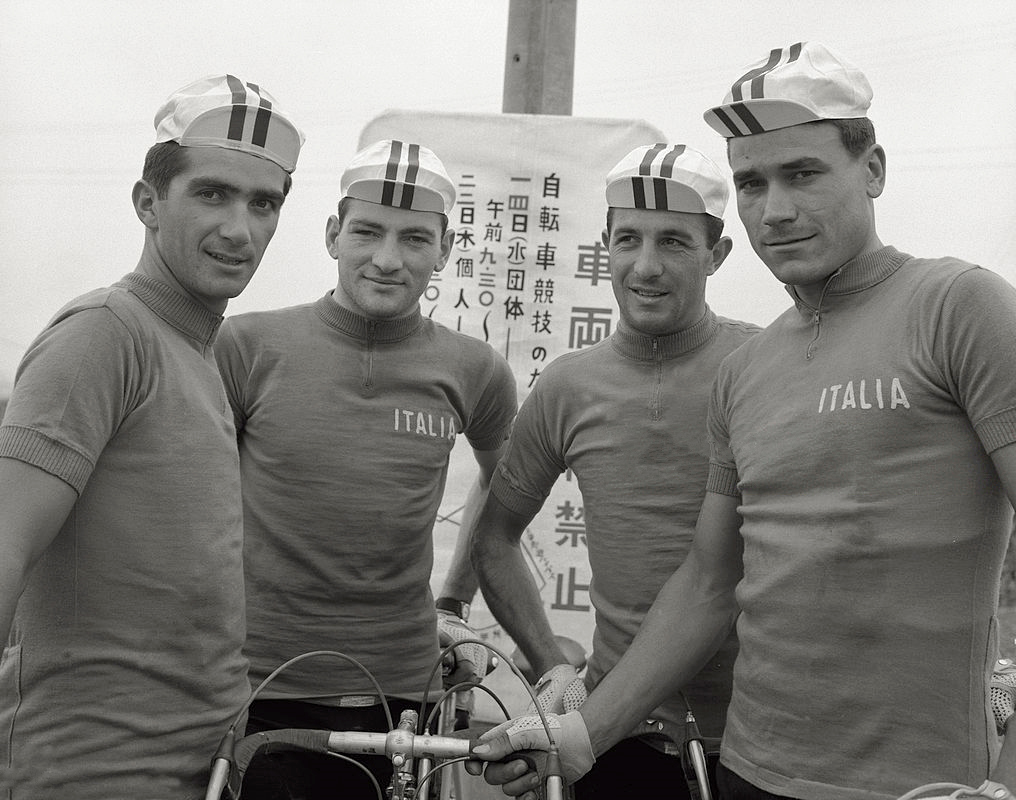
- Ferruccio Manza (2nd from left) at the 1964 Olympics

Personal information
- Born: 26 April 1943 (age 83) Brescia, Italy
- Height: 1.78 m (5 ft 10 in)
- Weight: 78 kg (172 lb)

Cycling career
- Sport: Cycling
- Discipline: Road
- Role: Rider
Medal record
Men's road cycling
Representing Italy
Olympic Games
Silver medal – second place	1964 Tokyo	Team time trial
World championships
Gold medal – first place	1964 Sallanches	Team time trial

Ferruccio Manza (born 26 April 1943) is a retired Italian road cyclist. Competing as amateur in the 100 km team time trial, he won an Olympics silver medal and a world title in 1964. He then had a brief career as a professional, which ended around 1967.
