= Deurle =

- Village
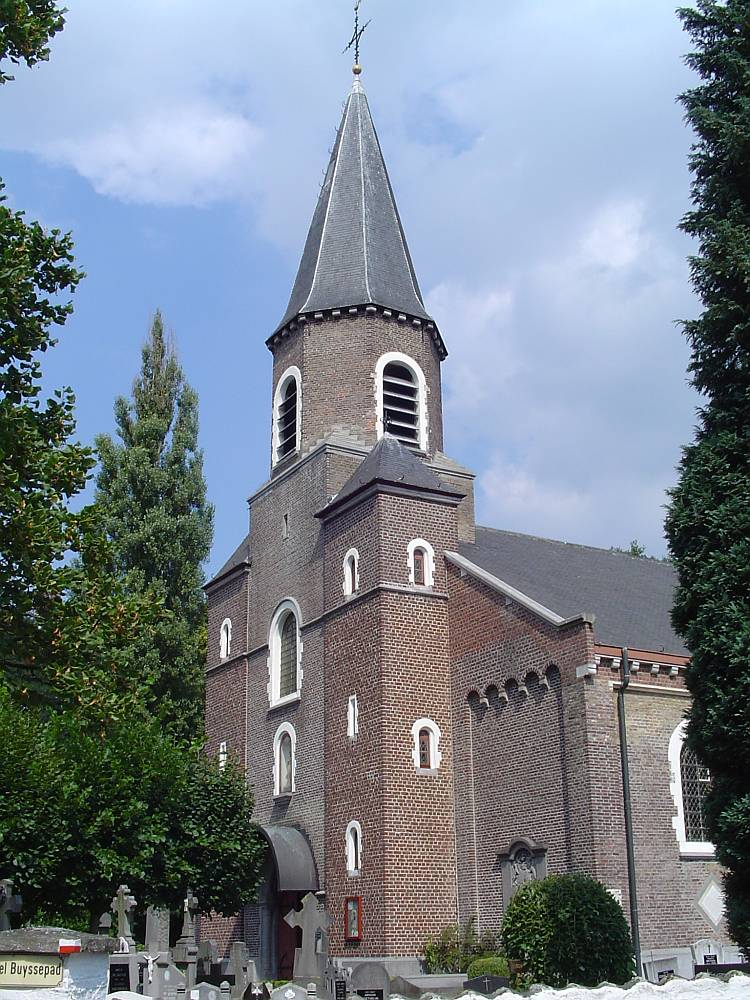
- Sint Aldegondis Church

- Location in Belgium
- Coordinates: 51°00′N 3°36′E
- Country: Belgium
- Province: East Flanders
- Municipality: Sint-Martens-Latem

Area
  - Total: 5.48 km^{2} (2.12 sq mi)

Population (2021)
  - Total: 2,492
  - Density: 455/km^{2} (1,180/sq mi)
- Time zone: CET

Deurle is part of the municipality of Sint-Martens-Latem located in the Flemish part of Belgium. Deurle is a picturesque small village near the borders of the river Lys and was added to Sint-Martens-Latem in 1977. Many well-known Flemish artists have lived in this village nested near a forest. Today, it is one of the best residential areas around Gent (Ghent), also counting numerous restaurants and bistros.

The village was first mentioned in 1114 as Durle, but artefacts from the Roman era have been discovered.

== Notable people ==
- Jenny Montigny (1875–1937), artist
- Gustave De Smet (1877-1943), artist

== Gallery ==
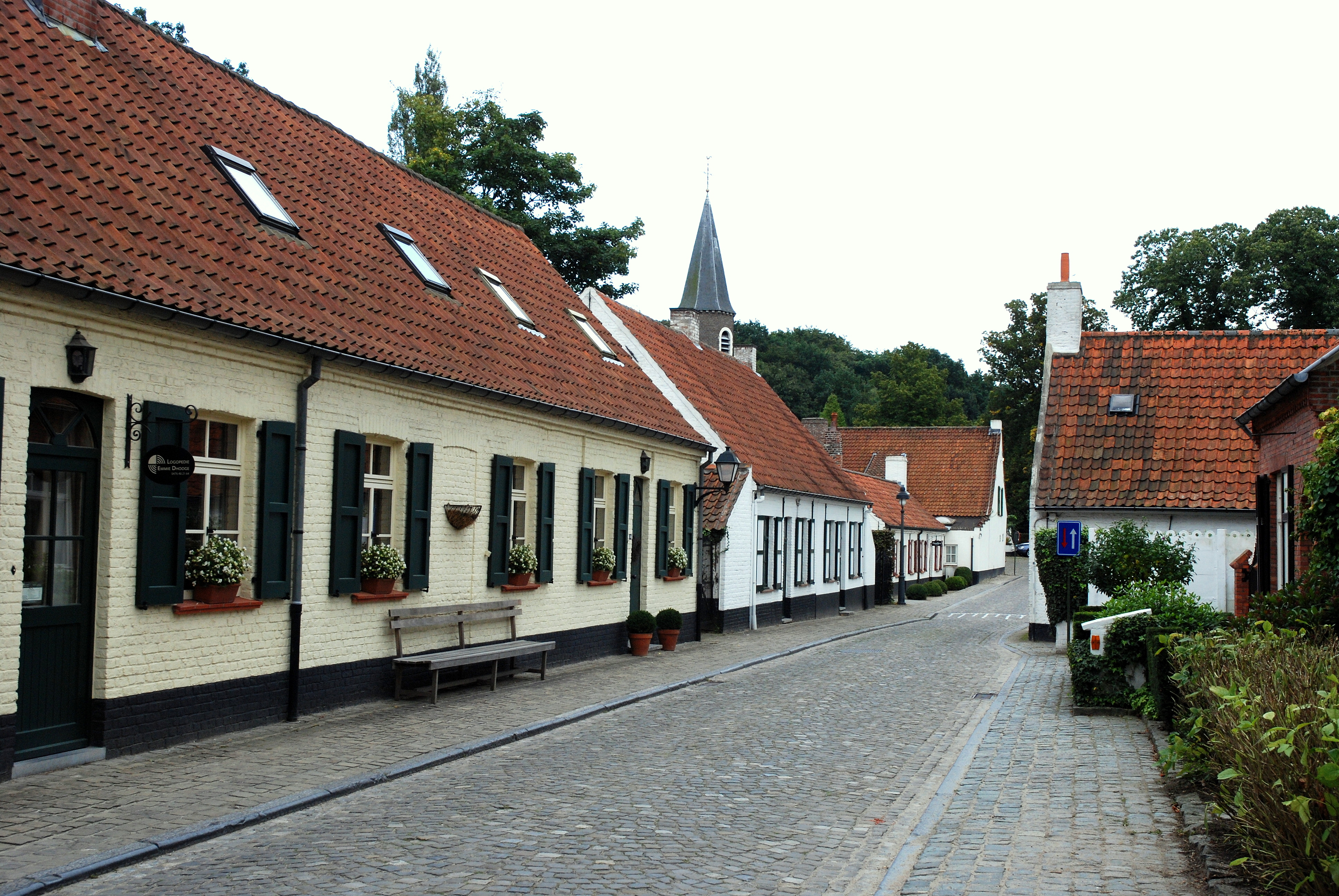
Street view

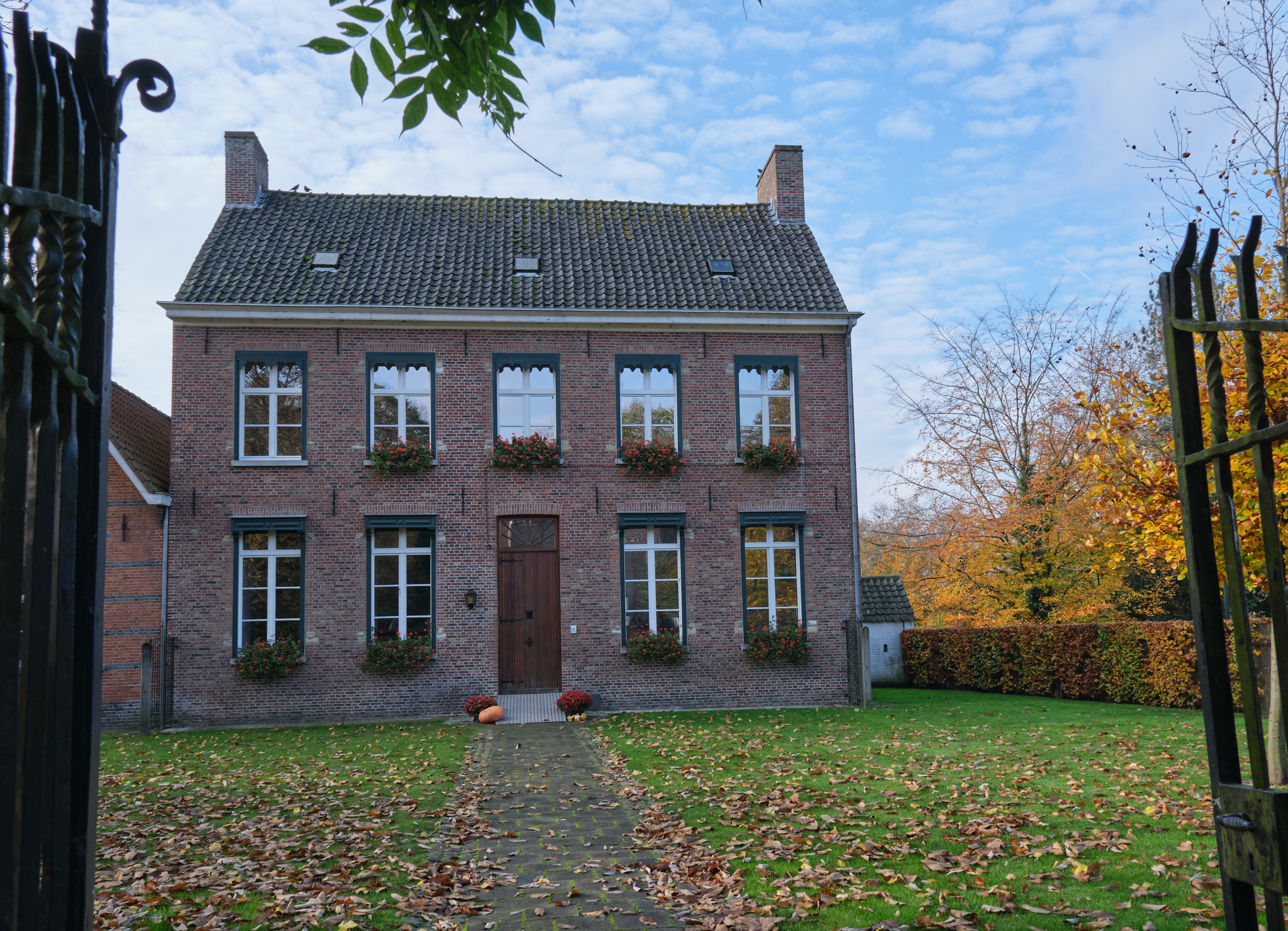
Clergy house

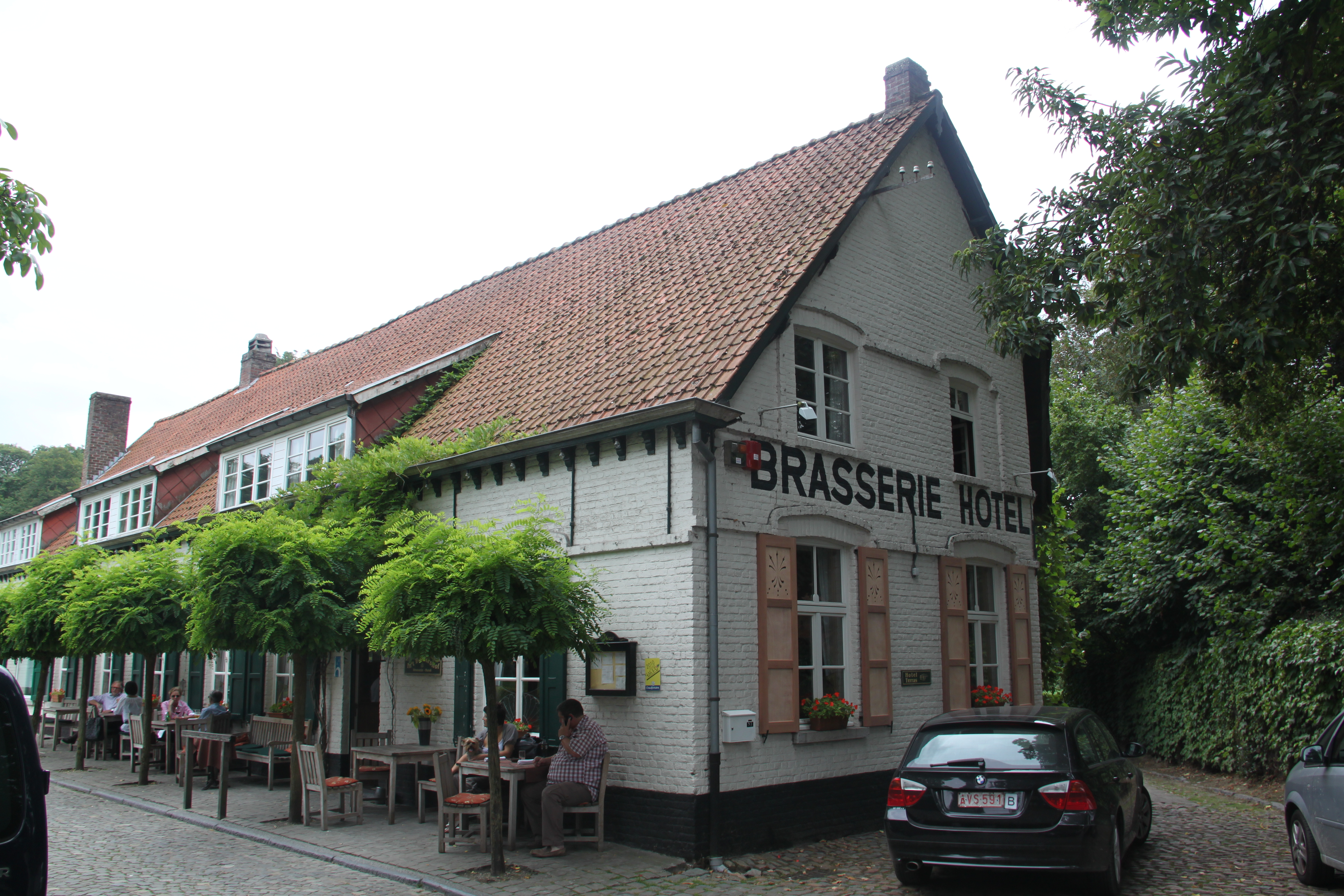
Brasserie hotel

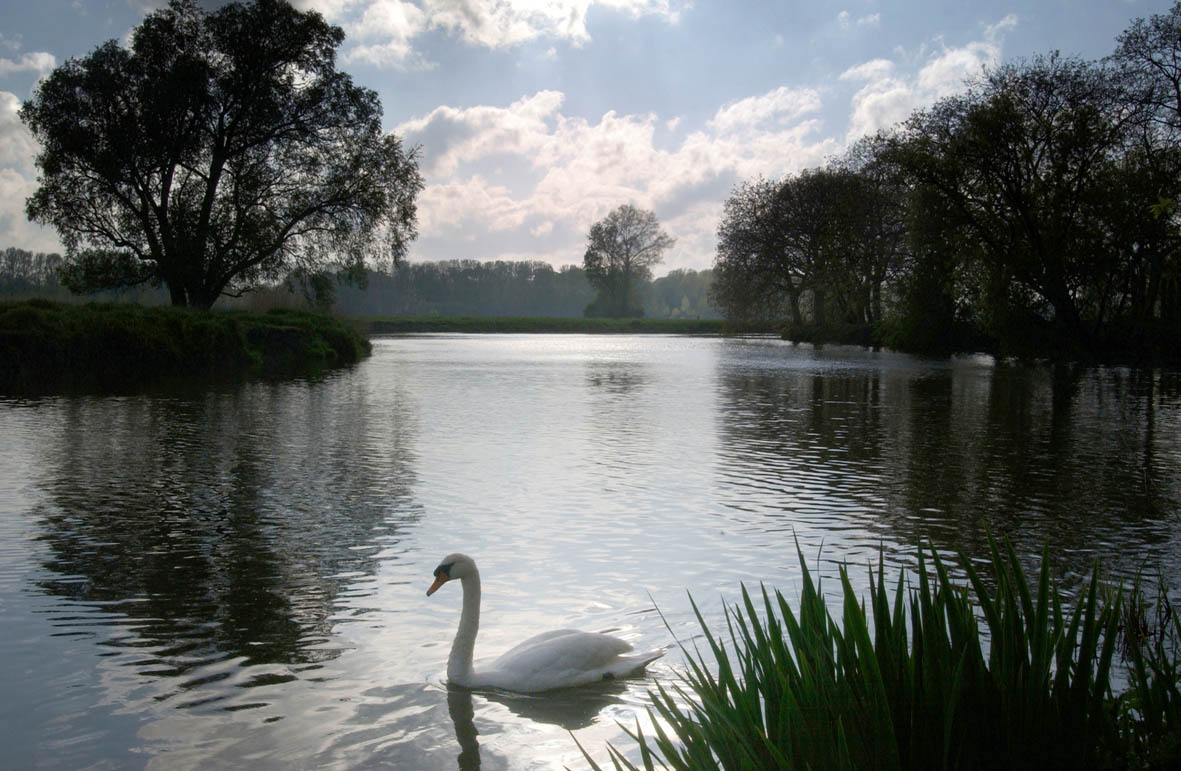
View on De Leie
