= Luca Sironi =

Italian cyclist

Personal information
- Full name: Gianluca Sironi
- Born: 28 June 1974 (age 52) Merate, Italy

Cycling career
- Sport: Cycling
- Current team: Retired
- Discipline: Road
- Role: Rider

Professional teams
- 1997: Aki–Safi
- 1998–2004: Vini Caldirola
- 2005: Liquigas–Bianchi

Gianluca Sironi (born 28 June 1974 in Merate) is an Italian former professional racing cyclist.

== Major results ==
1996
UCI Road World Under–23 Championships

1st Time trial
3rd Road race

1st Raiffeisen Grand Prix
1st Trofeo Alta Valle Del Tevere
Giro delle Regioni

1st Stages 3 & 6

1st Stage 6 Girobio
1998
2nd Time trial, National Road Championships
4th Overall Circuit des Mines
2001
10th Firenze–Pistoia
