= Klemens Großimlinghaus =

German cyclist

Personal information
- Born: 6 November 1941
- Died: 27 June 1991 (aged 49)

Cycling career
- Sport: Cycling
- Role: Rider

Klemens Großimlinghaus (6 November 1941 – 27 June 1991) was a German racing cyclist. He rode in the 1968 Tour de France.
