= Remi Van Vreckom =

Belgian cyclist (1943–2000)

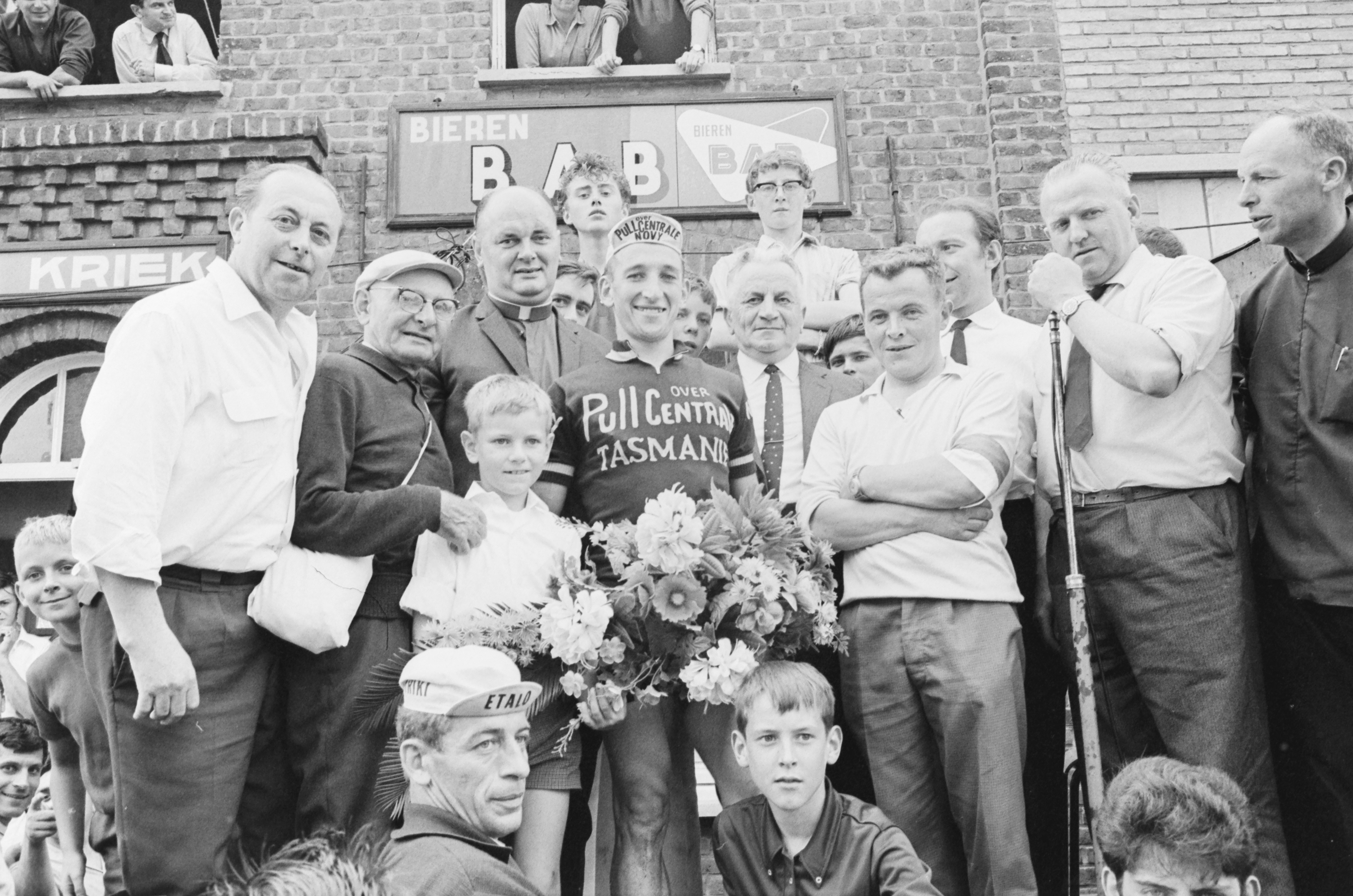

Personal information
- Born: 1 April 1943
- Died: 5 December 2000 (aged 57)

Cycling career
- Sport: Cycling
- Role: Rider

Remi Van Vreckom (1 April 1943 – 5 December 2000) was a Belgian racing cyclist. He rode in the 1968 Tour de France.
