= Severino Andreoli =

Italian cyclist

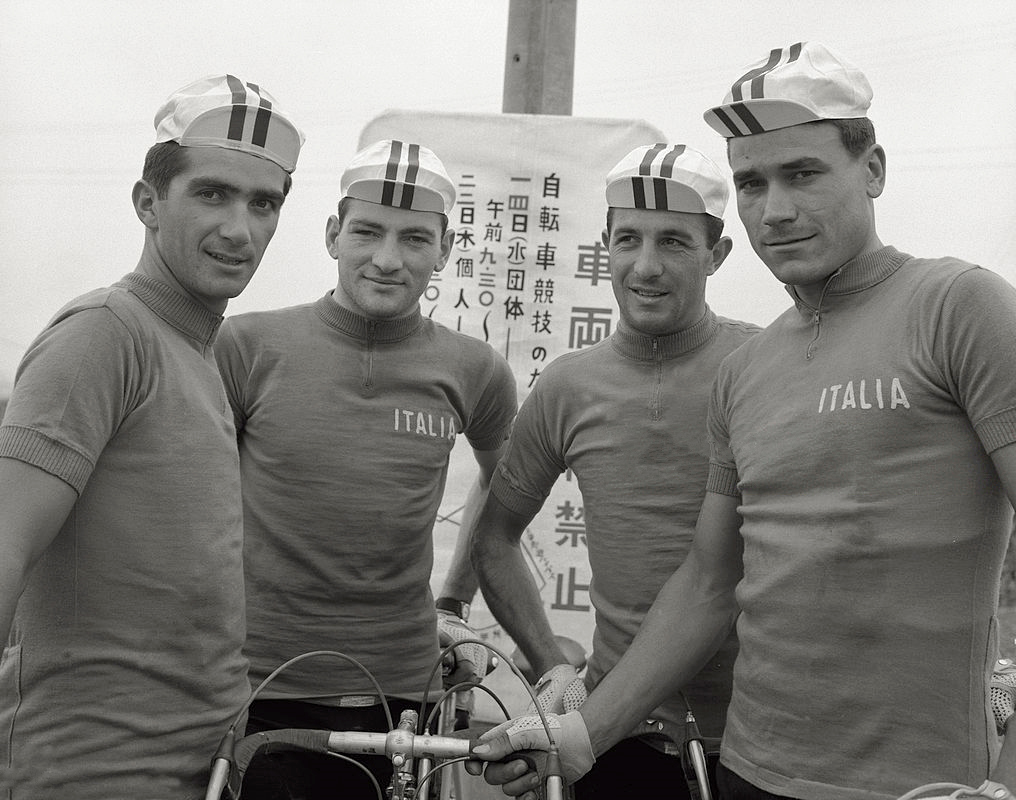
- Severino Andreoli (2nd from right) at the 1964 Olympics

Personal information
- Full name: Severino Andreoli
- Born: 8 January 1941 (age 85) Verona, Italy
- Height: 1.73 m (5 ft 8 in)
- Weight: 73 kg (161 lb)

Cycling career
- Sport: Cycling
- Discipline: Road
- Role: Rider
Medal record
Representing Italy
Olympic Games
| Silver medal – second place | 1964 Tokyo | Team time trial |
World championships
| Gold medal – first place | 1964 Sallanches | Team time trial |

Severino Andreoli (born 8 January 1941) is a retired Italian road cyclist. Competing as amateur in the 100 km team time trial, he won an Olympics silver medal and a world title in 1964. He then turned professional and won one stage of the Giro d'Italia in 1966. He rode the Tour de France in 1968.
