= Luca Colombo (cyclist) =

Italian cyclist (born 1969)

Personal information
- Born: 30 January 1969 (age 57) Cantù, Italy
- Height: 1.90 m (6 ft 3 in)
- Weight: 78 kg (172 lb; 12 st 4 lb)

Cycling career
- Sport: Cycling
- Current team: Retired
- Discipline: Road
- Role: Rider

Professional teams
- 1995–1996: Aki–Gipiemme
- 1997: Batik–Del Monte
Medal record
Men's cycling
Representing Italy
Olympic Games
Silver medal – second place	1992 Barcelona	Team Time Trial

Luca Colombo (born 26 December 1969) is an Italian former racing cyclist. He won the silver medal in the team time trial at the 1992 Summer Olympics. He also rode in the 1997 Tour de France, but did not finish.

== Major results ==
1986
1st Team time trial, UCI Junior World Road Championships
1987
1st Team time trial, UCI Junior World Road Championships
1989
2nd Time trial, National Amateur Road Championships
1990
1st Time trial, National Amateur Road Championships
1991
1st Team time trial, Mediterranean Games
1st Team time trial, UCI Road World Championships
1992
1st Duo Normand (with Gianfranco Contri)
2nd Team time trial, Summer Olympics
1993
1st Team time trial, Mediterranean Games
3rd Trofeo Papà Cervi
1994
1st Team time trial, UCI Road World Championships
1st Prologue & Stage 8b (ITT) Olympia's Tour
