= Pietro Guerra =

Italian cyclist

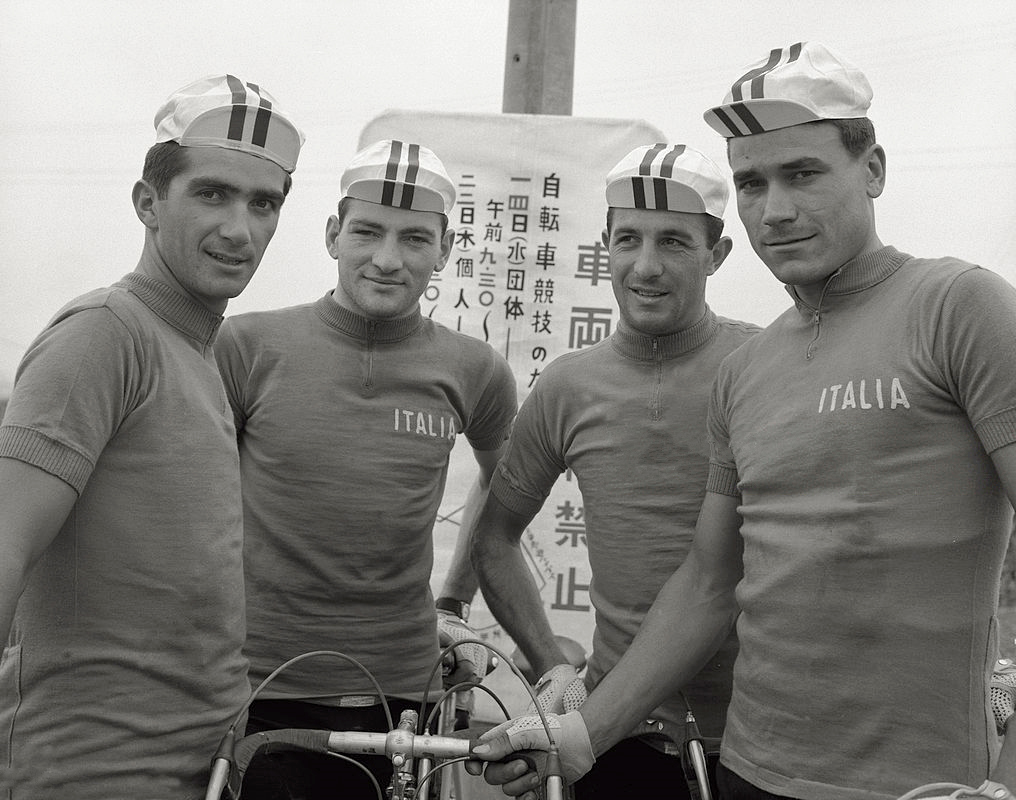
- Guerra (left) at the 1964 Olympics

Personal information
- Full name: Pietro Guerra
- Born: 28 June 1943 (age 83) San Pietro di Morubio, Italy
- Height: 1.71 m (5 ft 7 in)
- Weight: 71 kg (157 lb)

Cycling career
- Sport: Cycling
- Discipline: Road
- Role: Rider
Medal record
Men's road bicycle racing
Representing Italy
Olympic Games
Silver medal – second place	1964 Tokyo	Team time trial
World Championships
Gold medal – first place	1964 Sallanches	Team time trial
Gold medal – first place	1965 San Sebastián	Team time trial
Bronze medal – third place	1966 Nürburgring	Team time trial

Pietro Guerra (born 28 June 1943) is a retired Italian road cyclist. Competing as amateur in the 100 km team time trial, he won an Olympics silver medal in 1964 and two world titles, in 1964 and 1965, finishing third in 1966. Then he turned professional and rode the Tour de France in 1968–1972, winning one stage in 1971.

== Major results ==
1965
1st Coppa Collecchio
1968
Vuelta a España:

Winner stage 6

1970
Coppa Bernocchi
Cronostafetta (with Gianni Motta and Felice Gimondi)
GP Cemab
1971
Italy national track pursuit champion
Tour de France:

Winner stage 5

1972
Giro della Romagna
Italy national track pursuit champion
1973
Sverige Cup
Stockholm
