= 1996 UCI Road World Championships =

Cycling world championships

- Venue: Lugano, Switzerland
- Date: 9–13 October 1996
- Coordinates: 46°00′18″N 08°57′09″E
- Events: 6

The 1996 UCI Road World Championships took place in Lugano, Switzerland, between October 9 and October 13, 1996. The event consisted of a road race and a time trial for men, women and men under 23.

The men's road race had 151 starters, 49 classified finishers, 15 laps of 17 km, totaling 252 km. Winner's average speed: 39.39 km/h

For the first time, the 1996 UCI Track Cycling World Championships was not organized in the same country as the Road World championships. In 1996, it took place in Manchester, United Kingdom.

== Events summary ==
Event	Gold		Silver		Bronze	
Men's Events
Men's road race	Johan Museeuw; Belgium	6h23'50"	Mauro Gianetti; Switzerland	6h23'51"	Michele Bartoli; Italy	6h24'19"
Men's time trial	Alex Zülle; Switzerland	48'13"	Chris Boardman; Great Britain	48'52"	Tony Rominger; Switzerland	48'54"
Women's Events
Women's road race	Barbara Heeb; Switzerland	2h53'05"	Rasa Polikevičiūtė; Lithuania	2h53'22"	Linda Jackson; Canada	2h53'42"
Women's time trial	Jeannie Longo-Ciprelli; France	35'16.07"	Catherine Marsal; France	36'05.00"	Alessandra Cappellotto; Italy	36'10.47"
Men's Under-23 Events
Men's under-23 road race	Giuliano Figueras; Italy	4h23'50"	Roberto Sgambelluri; Italy	4h23'51"	Luca Sironi; Italy	4h24'19"
Men's under-23 time trial	Luca Sironi; Italy	37'51.89"	Roberto Sgambelluri; Italy	38'44.38"	Andreas Klöden; Germany	38'48.39"
