= Vertemate con Minoprio =

Vertemate con Minoprio Vertemaa cont Minoeubra (Lombard)
- Comune
- Comune di Vertemate con Minoprio
- Coat of arms

- Location within Italy Location within Lombardy
- Coordinates: 45°44′N 9°4′E
- Country: Italy
- Region: Lombardy
- Province: Como (CO)
- Frazioni: Minoprio, Vertemate

Government
  - Mayor: Roberto Antonio Sironi

Area
  - Total: 5.8 km^{2} (2.2 sq mi)
- Elevation: 380 m (1,250 ft)

Population (2008)
  - Total: 3,935
  - Density: 680/km^{2} (1,800/sq mi)
- Demonym(s): Minopriesi, Vertematesi
- Time zone: UTC+1 (CET)
  - Summer (DST): UTC+2 (CEST)
- Postal code: 22070
- Dialing code: 031
- Website: Official website

Vertemate con Minoprio (Comasco: Vertemaa cont Minoeubra [ʋerteˈmaː kũ miˈnøːbra]) is a comune (municipality) in the Province of Como in the Italian region Lombardy, about 30 kilometres (19 mi) north of Milan and about 9 kilometres (6 mi) south of Como.

== Main sights ==
- Abbey of San Giovanni a Vertemate, consecrated in 1096. The Romanesque church, with a nave and two aisles, is home to traces of frescoes from the 14th and 15th centuries.
- Castle
- Villa Raimondi

== Notable residents ==
- Simone Tomassini, Italian singer-songwriter was born in Vertemate con Minoprio in 1974.
