= Albert Herger =

Swiss cyclist

Personal information
- Born: 27 November 1942
- Died: 27 December 2009 (aged 67)

Cycling career
- Sport: Cycling
- Role: Rider

Albert Herger (27 November 1942 – 27 December 2009) was a Swiss racing cyclist. He rode in the 1968 Tour de France.
