= Derek Green (cyclist) =

British cyclist

Personal information
- Born: 6 February 1944 (age 82)

Cycling career
- Sport: Cycling
- Role: Rider

Derek Green (born 6 February 1944) is a British racing cyclist. He rode in the 1968 Tour de France.
