= 1988 UCI Road World Championships =

- Venue: Ronse, Belgium
- Coordinates: 50°45′N 03°36′E
- Events: 2

The 1988 UCI Road World Championships took place in Ronse, Belgium. As this was an Olympic year all the Olympic cycling events served as World Championships, leaving just the Professional road race and the Women's Team Time Trial to be contested. The men's road race was decided in a sprint involving three riders, Maurizio Fondriest, Claude Criquielion and Steve Bauer. 200 meters from the uphill finish, Bauer began the sprint and Fondriest was unable to respond. However, Bauer realised his gear was too heavy, quickly sat down, and shifted down gear. As a result, his speed temporarily dropped, and Criquielion accelerated to the right of Bauer, close to the barriers.

Unfortunately, at exactly that place, the barriers on the right hand side of the road (from the riders' perspective) were set up in an irregular manner by the organisers of the race, narrowing in width for about 1-1.5 meters. The riders were aware of this, since the championship consisted of 18 laps over the same circuit, and the riders had already passed that point 17 times before during the race. It is quite common for UCI world championship road races to have several laps over the same circuit.

As a result of Criquielion's temporarily higher speed and the sudden narrowing of the barriers, Criquielion had effectively trapped himself. Bauer did not alter his course after he started sprinting and kept his line. However, since the frontal TV camera was placed at an angle at the left side of the road (from the riders' perspective) and not perpendicular, it seemed from that point of view as if Bauer moved to the right to block Criquielion. This impression was strengthened by the narrowing of the barriers, which was at a similar angle as the angle of the camera.

As a result of his slightly greater speed and Bauer keeping his line, Criquielion came into contact with the back of Bauer's right elbow, pushing it out. Consequently, Criquielion veered a bit to the right, and his head hit against the body of a police man who has standing before the barrier. Next, Criquielion's bike hit the concrete block at the bottom of the barriers, and he fell. Bauer was able to "jump" his bike about a meter to the left, a remarkable manoeuvre of riding skills, but as a result of this lost much speed, making it easy for Fondriest to overtake him and claim the world title. Criquelion's bike was damaged too much to cycle again and he was passed by the pursuing group while walking to the finish line. Bauer finished second but was a couple of minutes later disqualified after the race.

Criquielion was later convinced to press criminal charges for voluntary and involuntary battering against Bauer. His first lawyer who pressed the criminal charges on his behalf was Orphale Crucke, who was also the president of the organising committee of the race, and therefore directly responsible for the irregular placement of the barriers, and, incidentally, also the mayor of the locality where the race took place (Ronse/Renaix), and running for re-election in the communal elections scheduled two months later.

The case came before the criminal court of Oudenaarde, where Bauer was cleared of all charges. Criquielion appealed before the court of Appeal of Ghent, which re-ran the case in all full details, as is normal in Belgian criminal law, and also fully cleared Bauer. In these criminal cases, even an involuntary push by Bauer would have been sufficient for establishing a criminal fault in principle (even if no intent was shown), and thus liability. No such fault was proven on the basis of detailed analysis of the TV coverage (including helicopter images), and Bauer was completely cleared.

== Events summary ==
Event	Gold		Silver		Bronze	
Men's Events
Professional Road Race	Maurizio Fondriest; Italy	7h 2' 11"	Martial Gayant; France	+ 27"	Juan Fernández; Spain	+ 41"
Women's Events
Team Time Trial	Italy; Monica Bandini; Roberta Bonanomi; Maria Canins; Francesca Galli	-	Soviet Union	-	United States	-
