= Maria Canins =

Italian racing cyclist

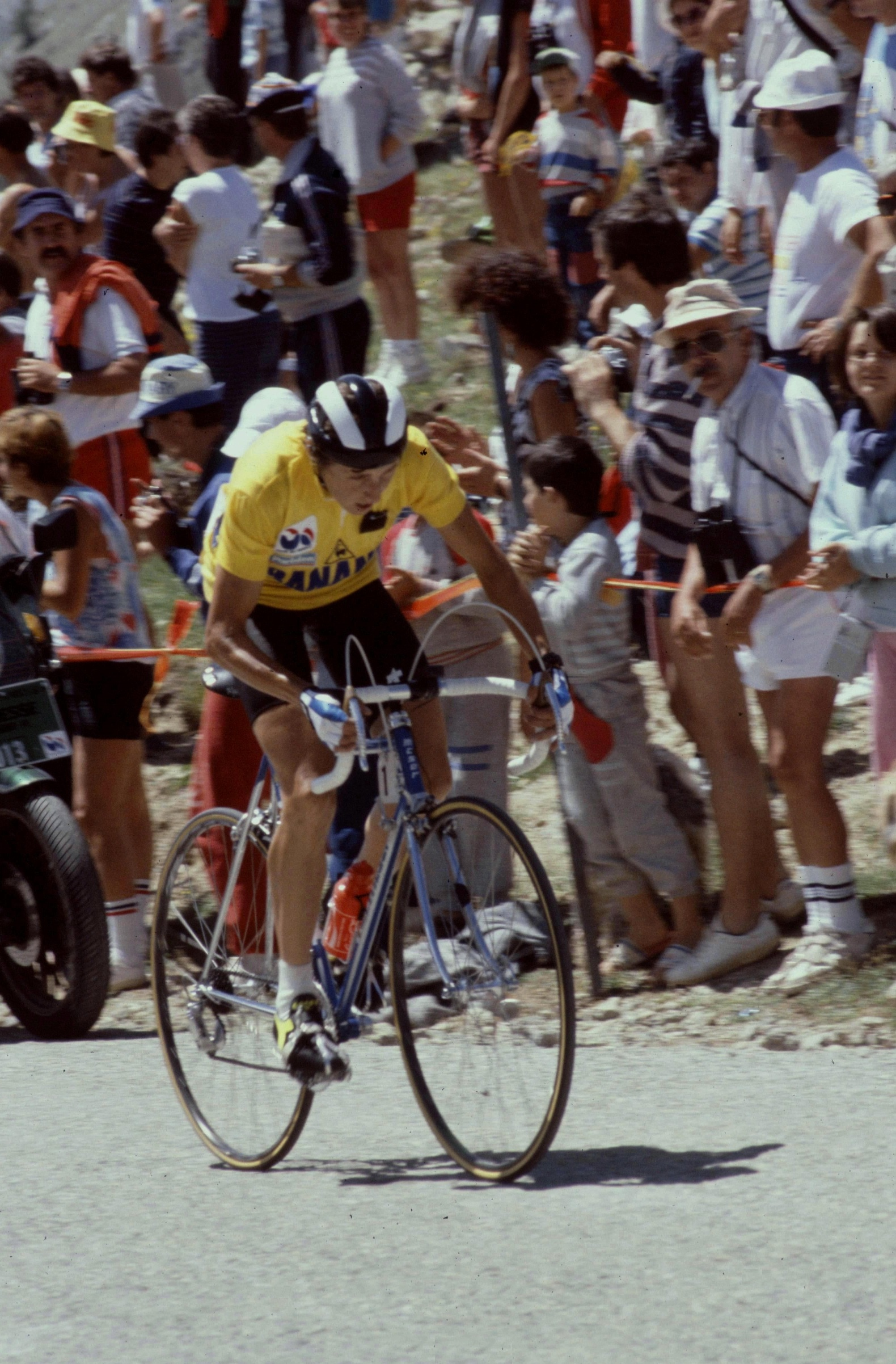
- Canins at the 1986 Tour de France Féminin

Personal information
- Full name: Maria Canins
- Nickname: Mamma volante (the flying mother)
- Born: 4 June 1949 (age 77) Badia, Italy

Cycling career
- Sport: Cycling
- Discipline: Road/Track/MTB/Skiing
- Role: Rider

Major wins
- Tour de France Féminin (1985–1986) Giro d'Italia Femminile (1988) Trofeo Alfredo Binda-Comune di Cittiglio (1984, 1985, 1990, 1992)
Medal record
Representing Italy
Women’s Cycling
UCI Road World Championships
Silver medal – second place	1982	Road race
Silver medal – second place	1985	Road race
Bronze medal – third place	1983	Road race
Bronze medal – third place	1989	Road race

Maria Canins (born 4 July 1949, in La Villa, Alta Badia is an Italian former road racing cyclist and cross-country skier. After winning several Italian national titles in cross-country skiing and becoming the first Italian woman to win the Vasaloppet, she switched to road cycling in the early 1980s. She won the Tour de France Féminin in 1985 and 1986, the inaugural Giro d'Italia Femminile in 1988, and was a member of the Italian team that won the UCI Women's Team Time Trial World Championship in 1988. Canins also competed in mountain biking and winter triathlon, winning the World Triathlon Winter Championships in 1997 and 1999.

== Biography ==
Canins was a cross-country skier from 1969 to 1988. She was Italian champion 15 times and the first Italian to win the Vasaloppet cross-county competition in Sweden and win from 1979 until 1988 10 times the Marcialonga. She began her professional cycling career at age 32, was double world champion and double Italian champion in mountain biking. She was married to the cross-country skier and ski mountaineer Bruno Bonaldi, who was a member of the civilian world championship team in the 1975 Trofeo Mezzalama.

== Palmarès ==
=== Road Cycling ===
1982
1st Road Race, National Road Championships
2nd Road Race, World Road Championships

1983
3rd Road Race, World Road Championships

1984
1st Road Race, National Road Championships
1st Overall Coors Classic

1st Prologue

1st Trofeo Alfredo Binda - Comune di Cittiglio
2nd Overall Tour of Norway
5th Road Race, Olympic Games

1985
1st Road Race, National Road Championships
1st Overall Grande Boucle Féminine Internationale

1st Stages 2, 4, 8, 9 & 11

1st Overall Tour of Norway

1st Stage 5

1st Trofeo Alfredo Binda - Comune di Cittiglio
2nd Road Race, World Road Championships
2nd Super Prestige Pernod

1986
1st Overall Grande Boucle Féminine Internationale

1st Prologue, Stages 5 & 6, 9, 11 & 13

1st Overall Tour of Norway
1st Overall Coppa dell'Adriatico

1st Points classification
1st Stage 4

2nd Super Prestige Pernod
8th Vertemate con Minoprio

1987
National Road Championships

1st Road Race
1st Time Trial

1st Overall Tour de l'Aude Cycliste Féminin
2nd Overall Grande Boucle Féminine Internationale
2nd Super Prestige Pernod
3rd Vertemate con Minoprio

1988
1st Team Time Trial, World Road Championships
National Road Championships

1st Road Race
1st Time Trial

1st Overall Giro d'Italia Femminile
2nd Overall Grande Boucle Féminine Internationale
2nd Overall Tour de l'Aude Cycliste Féminin

1989
National Road Championships

1st Road Race
1st Time Trial

1st GP Conad
World Road Championships

2nd Team Time Trial
3rd Road Race

2nd Overall Grande Boucle Féminine Internationale

1990
1st Time Trial, National Road Championships
1st Overall Tour de la Drôme

1st Prologue, Stages 3 & 4

1st Trofeo Alfredo Binda - Comune di Cittiglio
2nd Overall Giro d'Italia Femminile

1991
1st Sankt Johann in Tirol

1992
1st Trofeo Alfredo Binda - Comune di Cittiglio

1993
5th Trofeo Alfredo Binda - Comune di Cittiglio

1994
2nd Trofeo Spadaccini Chrono
3rd Villafranca di Forlì Chrono

1995
5th Time Trial, National Road Championships

== Cross-country skiing results ==
All results are sourced from the International Ski Federation (FIS).

=== World Championships ===
Year	Age	5 km	10 km	20 km	4 × 5 km relay
1982	32	—	—	20	—

=== World Cup ===
==== Season standings ====
Season	Age	Overall
1982	32	34
1983	33	37

=== Italian Championships ===
- 1971: 1st, Italian women's championships of cross-country skiing, 5 km pursuit
- 1977: 2nd, Italian women's championships of cross-country skiing, 10 km
- 1979: 2nd, Italian women's championships of cross-country skiing, 10 km
- 1980: 1st, Italian women's championships of cross-country skiing, 10 km
- 1981:
  - 1st, Italian women's championships of cross-country skiing, 20 km
  - 1st, Italian women's championships of cross-country skiing, 10 km
  - 1st, Italian women's championships of cross-country skiing, 5 km pursuit
- 1982:
  - 1st, Italian women's championships of cross-country skiing, 20 km
  - 1st, Italian women's championships of cross-country skiing, 10 km
  - 2nd, Italian women's championships of cross-country skiing, 5 km pursuit
- 1983:
  - 1st, Italian women's championships of cross-country skiing, 20 km
  - 1st, Italian women's championships of cross-country skiing, 10 km
- 1984:
  - 1st, Italian women's championships of cross-country skiing, 20 km
  - 1st, Italian women's championships of cross-country skiing, 10 km
  - 1st, Italian women's championships of cross-country skiing, 5 km pursuit
- 1985:
  - 1st, Italian women's championships of cross-country skiing, 5 km pursuit
  - 2nd, Italian women's championships of cross-country skiing, 10 km
  - 3rd, Italian women's championships of cross-country skiing, 20 km
- 1986: 3rd, Italian women's championships of cross-country skiing, 20 km
- 1988: 3rd, Italian women's championships of cross-country skiing, 5 km pursuit

== National titles ==
- Italian Mountain Running Championships
  - Mountain running: 1982

== See also ==
- List of multi-sport athletes

Awards
Preceded by Sara Simeoni	Italian Sportswoman of the Year; 1985–1986	Succeeded by Manuela Dalla Valle
