= Mino Denti =

Italian cyclist

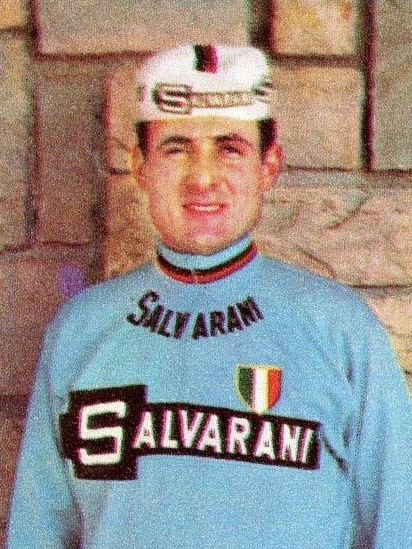
- Denti c. 1967

Personal information
- Born: 5 February 1945 (age 81) Soncino, Italy

Cycling career
- Sport: Cycling
- Current team: Retired
- Discipline: Road
- Role: Rider

Professional teams
- 1966–1967: Salvarani
- 1968: Faema
- 1969–1970: Scic

Major wins
- 1966 Tour de l'Avenir

Mino Denti (born 5 February 1945) is a retired Italian road cyclist. As an amateur he won the team time trial event at the 1965 World Championships and placed third in 1966. Later in 1966 he turned professional and won the Tour de l'Avenir in 1966 and Giro del Veneto in 1969. He placed 61st in the 1968 Tour de France.
