= Lithuanian National Road Race Championships =

Cycling competition

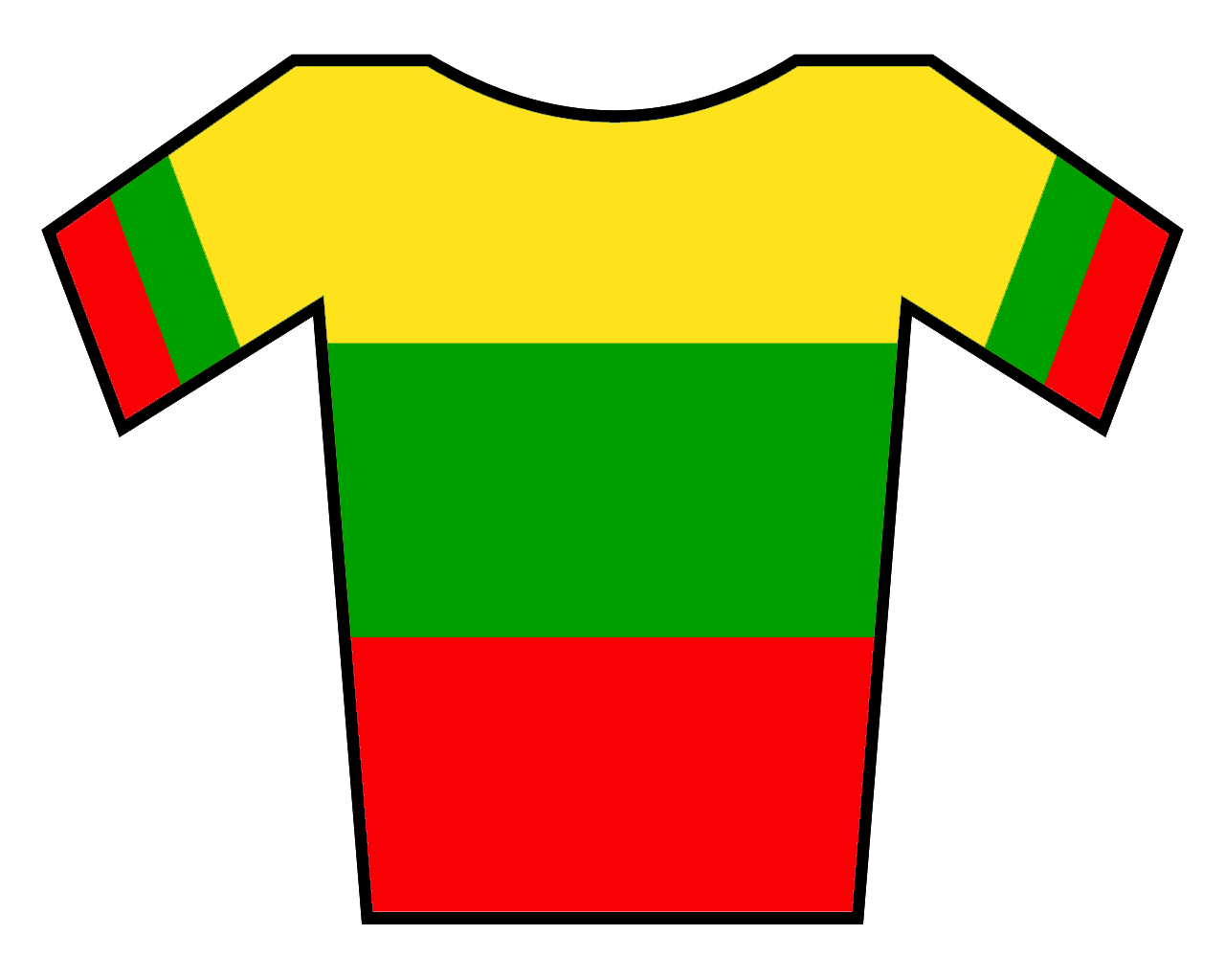

The Lithuanian National Road Race Championships have been held since 1997.

== Men ==
Year	Gold	Silver	Bronze
1997	Darius Strolė	Raimondas Vilčinskas	Linas Balčiūnas
1998	Arnoldas Saprykinas	Raimondas Rumšas	Darius Strolė
1999	Saulius Ruškys	Arnoldas Saprykinas	Saulius Šarkauskas
2000	Vladimir Smirnov	Remigijus Lupeikis	Saulius Ruškys
2001	Raimondas Rumšas	Saulius Ruškys	Vladimir Smirnov
2002	Remigijus Lupeikis	Mindaugas Goncaras	Saulius Ruškys
2003	Vytautas Kaupas	Tomas Vaitkus	Aivaras Baranauskas
2004	Tomas Vaitkus	Raimondas Vilčinskas	Aivaras Baranauskas
2005	Aivaras Baranauskas	Raimondas Rumšas	Vytautas Kaupas
2006	Dainius Kairelis	Ignatas Konovalovas	Mindaugas Goncaras
2007	Ramūnas Navardauskas	Ignatas Konovalovas	Dainius Kairelis
2008	Tomas Vaitkus	Andris Buividas	Marius Kukta
2009	Egidijus Juodvalkis	Gediminas Bagdonas	Vismantas Mockevičius
2010	Vytautas Kaupas	Ramūnas Navardauskas	Aidis Kruopis
2011	Ramūnas Navardauskas	Gediminas Bagdonas	Aidis Kruopis
2012	Gediminas Bagdonas	Ramūnas Navardauskas	Aidis Kruopis
2013	Tomas Vaitkus	Ignatas Konovalovas	Evaldas Šiškevičius
2014	Paulius Šiškevičius	Darijus Džervus	Ignatas Konovalovas
2015	Aidis Kruopis	Ramūnas Navardauskas	Egidijus Juodvalkis
2016	Ramūnas Navardauskas	Tomas Vaitkus	Paulius Šiškevičius
2017	Ignatas Konovalovas	Gediminas Bagdonas	Darijus Džervus
2018	Gediminas Bagdonas	Ramūnas Navardauskas	Evaldas Šiškevičius
2019	Ramūnas Navardauskas	Rojus Adomaitis	Venantas Lašinis
2020	Gediminas Bagdonas	Venantas Lašinis	Justas Beniušis
2021	Ignatas Konovalovas	Aivaras Mikutis	Evaldas Šiškevičius
2022	Venantas Lašinis	Aivaras Mikutis	Ignatas Konovalovas
2023	Rokas Adomaitis	Venantas Lašinis	Ignatas Konovalovas
2024	Rokas Adomaitis	Aivaras Mikutis	Rokas Kmieliauskas
2025	Aivaras Mikutis	Eimantas Gudiškis	Nikolas Klimavičius
2026	Aivaras Mikutis	Rokas Adomaitis	Rokas Kmieliauskas

=== U23 ===
Year	Gold	Silver	Bronze
2012	Paulius Šiškevičius	Tomas Norvaišas	Vladislav Popov
2013	Paulius Šiškevičius	Andrius Pečiulis	Žydrūnas Savickas
2014	Paulius Šiškevičius	Mykolas Račiūnas	Andrius Pečiulis
2015	Paulius Šiškevičius	Airidas Videika	Arunas Lendel
2016	Linas Rumšas	Raimondas Rumšas	Justas Beniušis
2017	Venantas Lašinis	Raimondas Rumšas	—N/a
2018	Rojus Adomaitis	Justas Beniušis	Venantas Lašinis
2019	Rojus Adomaitis	Venantas Lašinis	Justas Beniušis
2020	Mantas Januškevičius	Denas Masiulis	Rojus Adomaitis
2021	Aivaras Mikutis	Žygimantas Matuzevicius	Mantas Januškevičius
2022	Aivaras Mikutis	Žygimantas Matuzevicius	Rokas Kmieliauskas

== Women ==
Year	Gold	Silver	Bronze
1995	Rasa Polikevičiūtė	Jolanta Polikevičiūtė	Edita Pučinskaitė
1996	Diana Žiliūtė	Rasa Mažeikytė	Jolanta Polikevičiūtė
1997	Not held		
1998	Diana Žiliūtė	Edita Pučinskaitė	Jolanta Polikevičiūtė
1999	Diana Žiliūtė	Edita Kubelskienė	Liuda Triabaitė
2000– 2001	Not held		
2002	Zita Urbonaitė	Edita Kubelskienė	Erika Vilunaitė
2003	Edita Pučinskaitė	Diana Žiliūtė	Diana Elmentaitė
2004	Diana Žiliūtė	Daiva Tušlaitė	Edita Pučinskaitė
2005	Inga Čilvinaitė	Indrė Janulevičiūtė	Agnė Bagdonavičiūtė
2006	Diana Žiliūtė	Edita Pučinskaitė	Modesta Vžesniauskaitė
2007	Rasa Leleivytė	Diana Žiliūtė	Edita Pučinskaitė
2008	Modesta Vžesniauskaitė	Inga Čilvinaitė	Gintarė Gaivenytė
2009	Rasa Leleivytė	Diana Žiliūtė	Edita Janeliūnaitė
2010	Aušrinė Trebaitė	Urtė Juodvalkytė	Rasa Leleivytė
2011	Rasa Leleivytė	Inga Čilvinaitė	Aušrinė Trebaitė
2012	Inga Čilvinaitė	Svetlana Pauliukaitė	Kataržina Sosna
2013	Agnė Šilinytė	Karolina Pernavienė	Edita Janeliūnaitė
2014	Aušrinė Trebaitė	Edita Janeliūnaitė	Vilija Sereikaitė
2015	Daiva Ragažinskienė	Gabrielė Jankutė	Aušrinė Trebaitė
2016	Daiva Ragažinskienė	Silvija Pacevičienė	Edita Janeliūnaitė
2017	Daiva Ragažinskienė	Rasa Leleivytė	—N/a
2018	Rasa Leleivytė	Olivija Baleišytė	Daiva Ragažinskienė
2019	Silvija Pacevičienė	Kataržina Sosna	Inga Češulienė
2020	Inga Češulienė	Kataržina Sosna	Olivija Baleišytė
2021	Inga Češulienė	Akvilė Gedraitytė	Olivija Baleišytė
2022	Rasa Leleivytė	Olivija Baleišytė	Inga Češulienė

== See also ==
- Lithuanian National Time Trial Championships
- National road cycling championships
