= Lithuanian National Time Trial Championships =

National road cycling championship in Lithuania

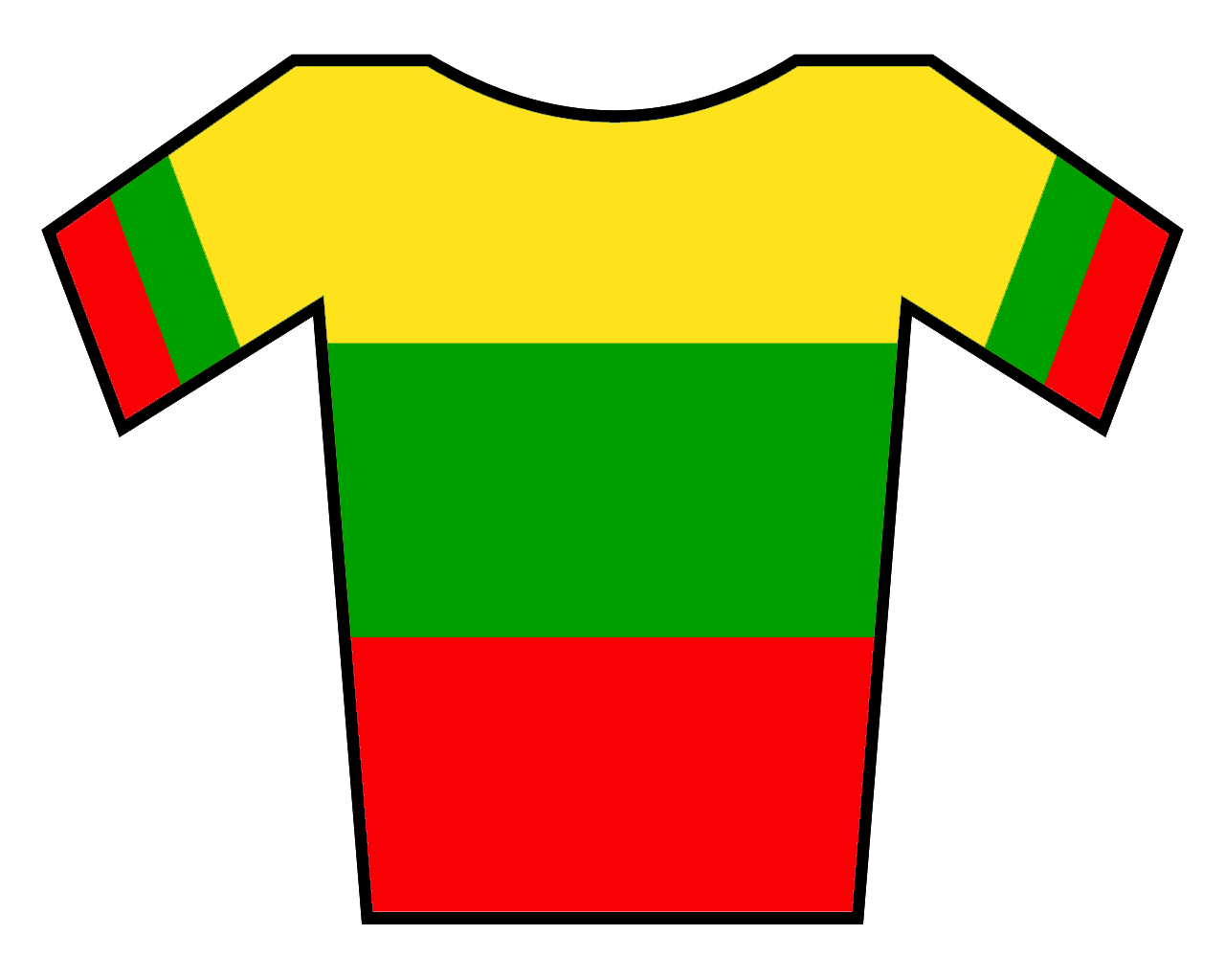

The Lithuanian National Time Trial Championships have been held since 1995.

== Men ==
Year	Gold	Silver	Bronze
1997	Raimondas Vilčinskas	Remigijus Lupeikis	Artūras Trumpauskas
1998	Raimondas Vilčinskas	Remigijus Lupeikis	Raimondas Rumšas
1999	Raimondas Rumšas	Artūras Kasputis	Raimondas Vilčinskas
2000	Remigijus Lupeikis	Darius Strolė	Linas Balčiūnas
2001	Remigijus Lupeikis	Linas Balčiūnas	Raimondas Rumšas
2002	Raimondas Vilčinskas	Remigijus Lupeikis	Mindaugas Goncaras
2003	Tomas Vaitkus	Raimondas Vilčinskas	Dainius Kairelis
2004	Tomas Vaitkus	Vytautas Kaupas	Gediminas Bagdonas
2005	Raimondas Rumšas	Tomas Vaitkus	Ignatas Konovalovas
2006	Ignatas Konovalovas	Gediminas Bagdonas	Simas Kondrotas
2007	Gediminas Bagdonas	Ignatas Konovalovas	Evaldas Šiškevičius
2008	Ignatas Konovalovas	Tomas Vaitkus	Evaldas Šiškevičius
2009	Ignatas Konovalovas	Evaldas Šiškevičius	Ramūnas Navardauskas
2010	Ignatas Konovalovas	Evaldas Šiškevičius	Ramūnas Navardauskas
2011	Gediminas Bagdonas	Ramūnas Navardauskas	Evaldas Šiškevičius
2012	Ramūnas Navardauskas	Ignatas Konovalovas	Gediminas Bagdonas
2013	Ignatas Konovalovas	Gediminas Bagdonas	Ramūnas Navardauskas
2014	Ramūnas Navardauskas	Ignatas Konovalovas	Gediminas Bagdonas
2015	Ramūnas Navardauskas	Gediminas Bagdonas	Ignatas Konovalovas
2016	Ignatas Konovalovas	Paulius Šiškevičius	Raimondas Rumšas
2017	Ignatas Konovalovas	Gediminas Bagdonas	Raimondas Rumšas
2018	Gediminas Bagdonas	Ramūnas Navardauskas	Evaldas Šiškevičius
2019	Gediminas Bagdonas	Evaldas Šiškevičius	Ramūnas Navardauskas
2020	Evaldas Šiškevičius	Gediminas Bagdonas	Venantas Lašinis
2021	Evaldas Šiškevičius	Aivaras Mikutis	Venantas Lašinis
2022	Aivaras Mikutis	Evaldas Šiškevičius	Venantas Lašinis

=== U23 ===
Year	Gold	Silver	Bronze
2015	Paulius Šiškevičius	Raimondas Rumšas	Jonas Maiselis
2016	Raimondas Rumšas	Justas Beniušis	Venantas Lašinis
2017	Venantas Lašinis	Arvydas Birenis	Justas Beniušis
2018	Justas Beniušis	Venantas Lašinis	Kęstutis Vaitaitis
2019	Justas Beniušis	Venantas Lašinis	Adomaitis Rojus
2020	Rokas Kmieliauskas	Mantas Januškevičius	Denas Masiulis
2021	Rokas Kmieliauskas	Denas Masiulis	Aristidas Kelmelis
2022	Rokas Kmieliauskas	Žygimantas Matuzevičius	Aristidas Kelmelis

== Women ==
Year	Gold	Silver	Bronze
1995	Rasa Polikevičiūtė	Diana Žiliūtė	Liuda Triabaitė
1996			
1997			
1998	Edita Pučinskaitė	Diana Žiliūtė	Jolanta Polikevičiūtė
1999	Edita Pučinskaitė	Rasa Mažeikytė	Rasa Polikevičiūtė
2000			
2001			
2002	Edita Pučinskaitė	Diana Elmentaitė	Indrė Janulevičiūtė
2003	Diana Žiliūtė	Edita Pučinskaitė	Diana Elmentaitė
2004	Diana Žiliūtė	Ramūnė Lipinskaitė	Aušrinė Trebaitė
2005	Svetlana Pauliukaitė	Inga Čilvinaitė	Daiva Tuslaitė
2006	Edita Pučinskaitė	Daiva Tuslaitė	Diana Elmentaitė
2007	Edita Pučinskaitė	Daiva Tuslaitė	Aušrinė Trebaitė
2008	Daiva Tuslaitė	Diana Žiliūtė	Aušrinė Trebaitė
2009	Diana Žiliūtė	Vilija Sereikaitė	Aušrinė Trebaitė
2010	Kataržina Sosna	Vilija Sereikaitė	Aleksandra Sošenko
2011	Aušrinė Trebaitė	Kataržina Sosna	Aleksandra Sošenko
2012	Vilija Sereikaitė	Kataržina Sosna	Aušrinė Trebaitė
2013	Inga Čilvinaitė	Kataržina Sosna	Roberta Pilkauskaitė
2014	Aušrinė Trebaitė	Daiva Tuslaitė	Kataržina Sosna
2015	Aušrinė Trebaitė	Silvija Latožaitė	Daiva Tuslaitė
2016	Aušrinė Trebaitė	Daiva Tuslaitė	Silvija Latožaitė
2017	Ernesta Strainyté	Justina Jovaišytė	Ieva Venckute
2018	Daiva Ragažinskienė	Olivija Baleišytė	Silvija Latožaitė
2019	Kataržina Sosna	Silvija Latožaitė	Akvilė Gedraitytė
2020	Kataržina Sosna	Akvilė Gedraitytė	Inga Čilvinaitė
2021	Inga Češulienė	Viktorija Senkutė	Olivija Baleišytė
2022	Inga Češulienė	Akvilė Gedraitytė	Inga Paplauskė

== See also ==
- Lithuanian National Road Race Championships
- National road cycling championships
