= Grand Prix de Beuvry-la-Forêt =

Road cycling race

Race details
- Date: June
- Region: Beuvry-la-Forêt, France
- Discipline: Road
- Competition: National calendar
- Type: One-day race
- Organiser: Organisation Cycliste du Douaisis

History
- Editions: 65
- Final edition: 2015
- Most wins: No repeat winners
- Final winner: Alexandre Gratiot (FRA)

The Grand Prix de Beuvry-la-Forêt was a one-day road cycling race that took place between the cities of around the town of Beuvry-la-Forêt, France. From 2005 to 2008, it was held as a 1.2 event on the UCI Europe Tour. Prior to 2012 the race took place in August before being moved to June.

== Winners ==
| Year | Winner | Second | Third |
|---|---|---|---|
| 1988 | (France) Philippe Duhamel | | |
| 1989 | (France) Jean-François Laffillé | | |
| 1990 | (Belgium) Wim Omloop | (France) Fabrice Debrabant | (Belgium) Chris Peers |
| 1991 | (Lithuania) Naglis Tsipiliauskas | (Lithuania) Linas Knistaustas | (Lithuania) Artūras Kasputis |
| 1992 | (France) Albert Delrue | (Finland) Joona Laukka | (Poland) Zdzisław Wrona |
| 1993 | (Lithuania) Artūras Kasputis | (Lithuania) Remigius Lupeikis | (France) Fabrice Debrabant |
| 1994 | (Lithuania) Remigius Lupeikis | (France) Grégory Barbier | (Lithuania) Artūras Trumpauskas |
| 1995 | (France) Jean-Claude Thilloy | (Belgium) Jean-Philippe Loy | (France) Nicolas L'Hote |
| 1996 | (Latvia) Romāns Vainšteins | (France) Thierry Bricaud | (Belgium) Danny In 't Ven |
| 1997 | (France) Denis Dugouchet | (France) Philippe Duhamel | (France) Jean-Michel Thilloy |
| 1998 | (France) Fabrice Debrabant | (France) Jean-Claude Thilloy | (Lithuania) Saulius Ruškys |
| 1999 | (Lithuania) Raimondas Vilčinskas | (Lithuania) Saulius Ruškys | (France) Nicolas L'Hote |
| 2000 | (France) Pascal Carlot | (France) Gregory Faghel | (France) Nicolas L'Hote |
| 2001 | (Belgium) Jurgen De Buysschere | (France) Nicolas L'Hote | (Belgium) Ivan Moreau |
| 2002 | (Belgium) Danny In 't Ven | (Belgium) Tom De Meyer | (France) Serge Oger |
| 2003 | (Lithuania) Aivaras Baranauskas | (France) Frédéric Delalande | (France) Antoine Nys |
| 2004 | (France) Stéphane Pétilleau | (France) Martial Locatelli | (France) Frédéric Mille |
| 2005 | (Netherlands) Maint Berkenbosch | (France) Mickaël Delattre | (France) Stéphane Bonsergent |
| 2006 | (France) Jean Zen | (Russia) Sergey Kolesnikov | (France) Anthony Jaunet |
| 2007 | (Lithuania) Vytautas Kaupas | (Lithuania) Mindaugas Striška | (France) Michel Lelièvre |
| 2008 | (Lithuania) Aivaras Baranauskas | (France) Florian Vachon | (France) Jean-Marc Bideau |
| 2009 | (France) Gaylord Cumont | (Russia) Dimitry Samokhvalov | (Estonia) Kalle Kriit |
| 2010 | (France) Pierre-Luc Périchon | (Poland) Mickael Olejnik | (France) Kévin Lalouette |
| 2011 | (France) Jocelyn Lemperriere | (Poland) Mickael Olejnik | (France) Romain Fondard |
| 2012 | (France) Alexandre Gratiot | (France) Mathieu Desniou | (Canada) Ryan Aitcheson |
| 2013 | (France) Méven Lebreton | (France) Benoît Daeninck | (France) Nicolas Garbet |
| 2014 | (France) Vincent Ginelli | (France) Benoît Daeninck | (Estonia) Oskar Nisu |
| 2015 | (France) Alexandre Gratiot | (Estonia) Joonas Jõgi | (France) Benjamin Le Roscouët |
