= Rasa Leleivytė =

Lithuanian road racing cyclist

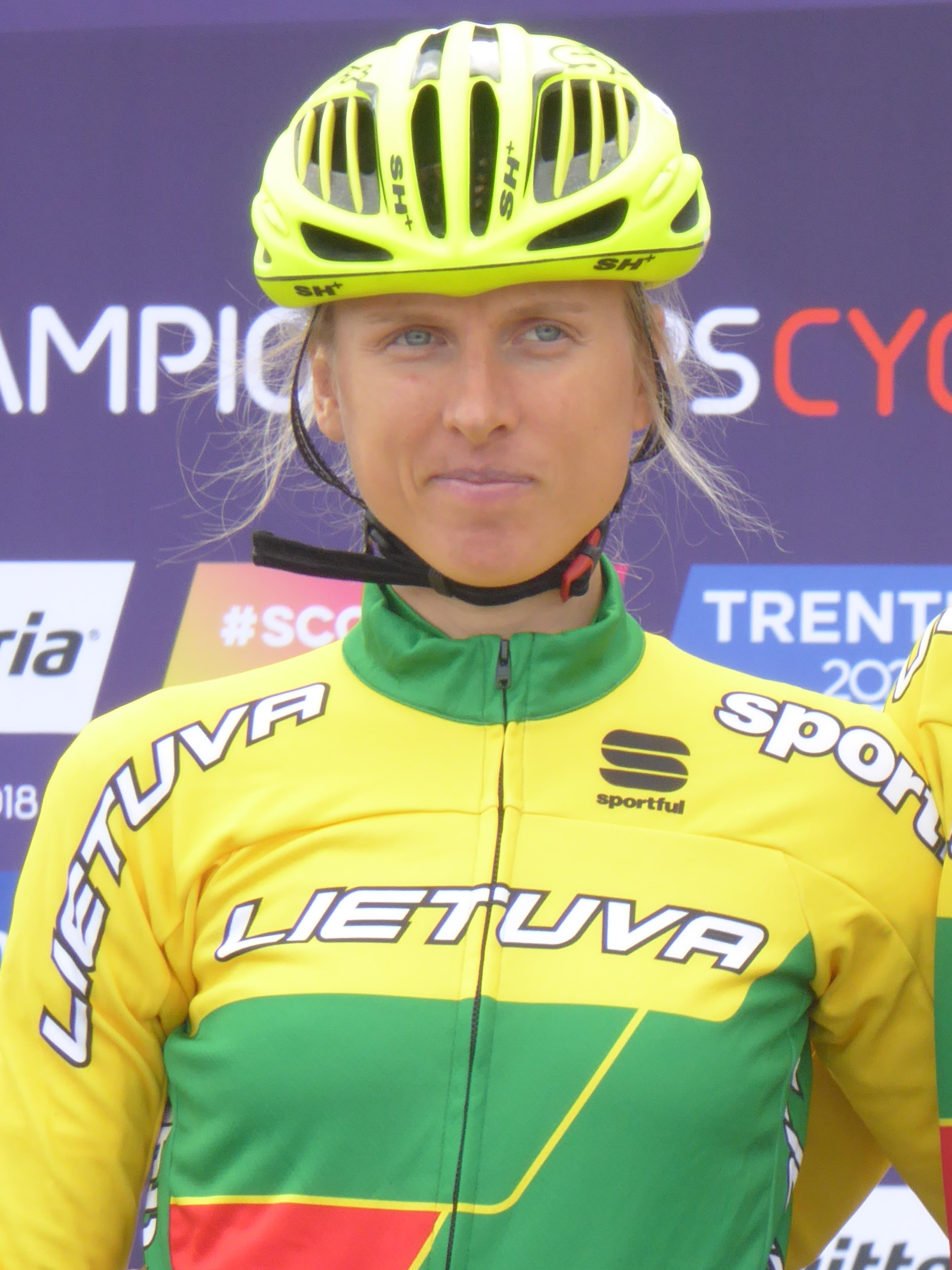
- Leleivytė at the 2018 European Road Cycling Championships.

Personal information
- Full name: Rasa Leleivytė
- Born: 22 July 1988 (age 38): Vilnius, Lithuanian SSR, Soviet Union; (now Lithuania)

Cycling career
- Sport: Cycling
- Current team: Aromitalia Vaiano
- Discipline: Road
- Role: Rider

Professional teams
- 2008: SC Michela Fanini Record Rox
- 2009–2010: Safi–Pasta Zara–Titanedi
- 2011–2012: Vaiano Solaristech
- 2014–: Vaiano Fondriest
Medal record
Representing Lithuania
Women's Road cycling
European Championships
Bronze medal – third place	2021 Trentino	Road race

Rasa Leleivytė (born 22 July 1988) is a Lithuanian professional road racing cyclist, who currently rides for UCI Women's Continental Team Aromitalia Vaiano.

== Career ==
She had a top-ten finish in the women's road race at the 2019 European Games, placing ninth overall at the finish in Minsk, Belarus, credited with the same time as the race winner, Lorena Wiebes of the Netherlands.

She finished third at the 2021 European Road Championships. She competed at the delayed 2020 Olympic Games in Tokyo, Japan, in 2021, placing 35th overall in the women's road race, where she competed with broken ribs sustained competing in Italy prior to the race. In 2021 Leleivytė won the Lithuanian Female Cyclist of the Year award.

She finished in twentieth place overall in the women's road race at the 2024 Olympic Games in Paris, France.

In April 2025, she had a top-ten finish at the Volta Limburg Classic in the Netherlands, finishing three seconds behind the race winner, Dutch cyclist Femke Gerritse, in tenth place.

== Doping ==
On July 18, 2012, it was announced that she failed a doping test on June 12 of the same year and that her A sample was consistent with the use of EPO. Leilevytė had to pay a 5040 Euro fine and was suspended for two years until 13 July 2014.

== Personal life ==
She is from Vilnius. She attended Barbora Radvilaitė Secondary School, where she was a contemporary of fellow future-Olympic cyclist for Lithuania Evaldas Šiškevičius. She later based herself in Italy. Her husband Paolo Baldi works as the sports director of the Lithuanian-based Aromitalia 3T Vaiano team.

== Major results ==
2005
3rd Road race, UCI Juniors World Championships
3rd Road race, National Road Championships
2006
1st Road race, UCI Juniors World Championships
2007
1st Road race, National Road Championships
3rd Road race, UEC European Road Championships
4th Grand Prix de Dottignies
2008
1st Road race, UEC European Road Championships
1st Giro del Valdarno
2nd Classica Citta di Padova
3rd GP Carnevale d'Europa
5th Overall La Route de France
7th Overall Tour Féminin en Limousin

1st Young rider classification

2009
1st Road race, National Road Championships
4th Road race, UEC European Road Championships
8th GP de Plouay – Bretagne
2010
1st GP Comune di Cornaredo
1st Stage 3 Trophée d'Or Féminin
3rd Road race, National Road Championships
3rd Overall Ladies Tour of Qatar

1st Stage 1

4th GP Liberazione
8th Road race, UCI Road World Championships
8th Road race, UEC European Road Championships
10th GP de Plouay – Bretagne
2011
1st Road race, National Road Championships
1st GP Comune di Cornaredo
3rd Overall Giro della Toscana Int. Femminile – Memorial Michela Fanini
4th GP Liberazione
5th Overall Giro del Trentino Alto Adige-Südtirol
5th Grand Prix de Dottignies
5th Tour of Chongming Island World Cup
9th Road race, UCI Road World Championships
9th GP de Plouay – Bretagne
2012
5th Grand Prix de Dottignies
9th GP Comune di Cornaredo
2015
3rd SwissEver GP Cham-Hagendorn
8th Overall Auensteiner–Radsporttage
10th GP de Plouay
2016
4th Giro dell'Emilia Internazionale Donne Elite
5th Road race, UEC European Road Championships
6th Gooik–Geraardsbergen–Gooik
6th Gran Premio Bruno Beghelli Internazionale Donne Elite
7th La Classique Morbihan
2017
2nd Road race, National Road Championships
2nd Gran Premio della Liberazione
2nd Giro dell'Emilia Internazionale Donne Elite
7th Tour of Flanders for Women
7th Gran Premio Bruno Beghelli Internazionale Donne Elite
2018
1st Road race, National Road Championships
1st Giro dell'Emilia Internazionale Donne Elite
2nd La Classique Morbihan
3rd Gran Premio della Liberazione
5th Road race, UEC European Road Championships
6th Brabantse Pijl Dames Gooik
9th Flanders Ladies Classic
10th Gran Premio Bruno Beghelli Internazionale Donne Elite
2019
3rd Overall Giro delle Marche in Rosa
4th Overall Giro della Toscana Int. Femminile – Memorial Michela Fanini
4th Giro dell'Emilia Internazionale Donne Elite
9th Road race, European Games
10th Road race, UEC European Road Championships
2020
2nd Giro dell'Emilia Internazionale Donne Elite
6th Brabantse Pijl Dames Gooik
2021
2nd Overall Giro della Toscana Int. Femminile – Memorial Michela Fanini
3rd Road race, UEC European Road Championships
4th Giro dell'Emilia Internazionale Donne Elite
2022
1st Road race, National Road Championships
4th Gran Premio della Liberazione
5th Ladies Tour of Estonia
6th Overall Giro della Toscana Int. Femminile – Memorial Michela Fanini
8th Giro dell'Emilia Internazionale Donne Elite
9th Memorial Monica Bandini
2023
2nd Overall Giro della Toscana Int. Femminile – Memorial Michela Fanini

1st Stage 2

3rd Road race, National Road Championships
2024
8th Gran Premio della Liberazione
