= Kairelis =

Kairelis is a Lithuanian surname. Notable people with the surname include:

- Dainius Kairelis (born 1979), Lithuanian road bicycle racer
- Rimas Álvarez Kairelis (born 1974), Argentine rugby union player
