= Ramūnas Navardauskas =

Lithuanian racing cyclist (born 1988)

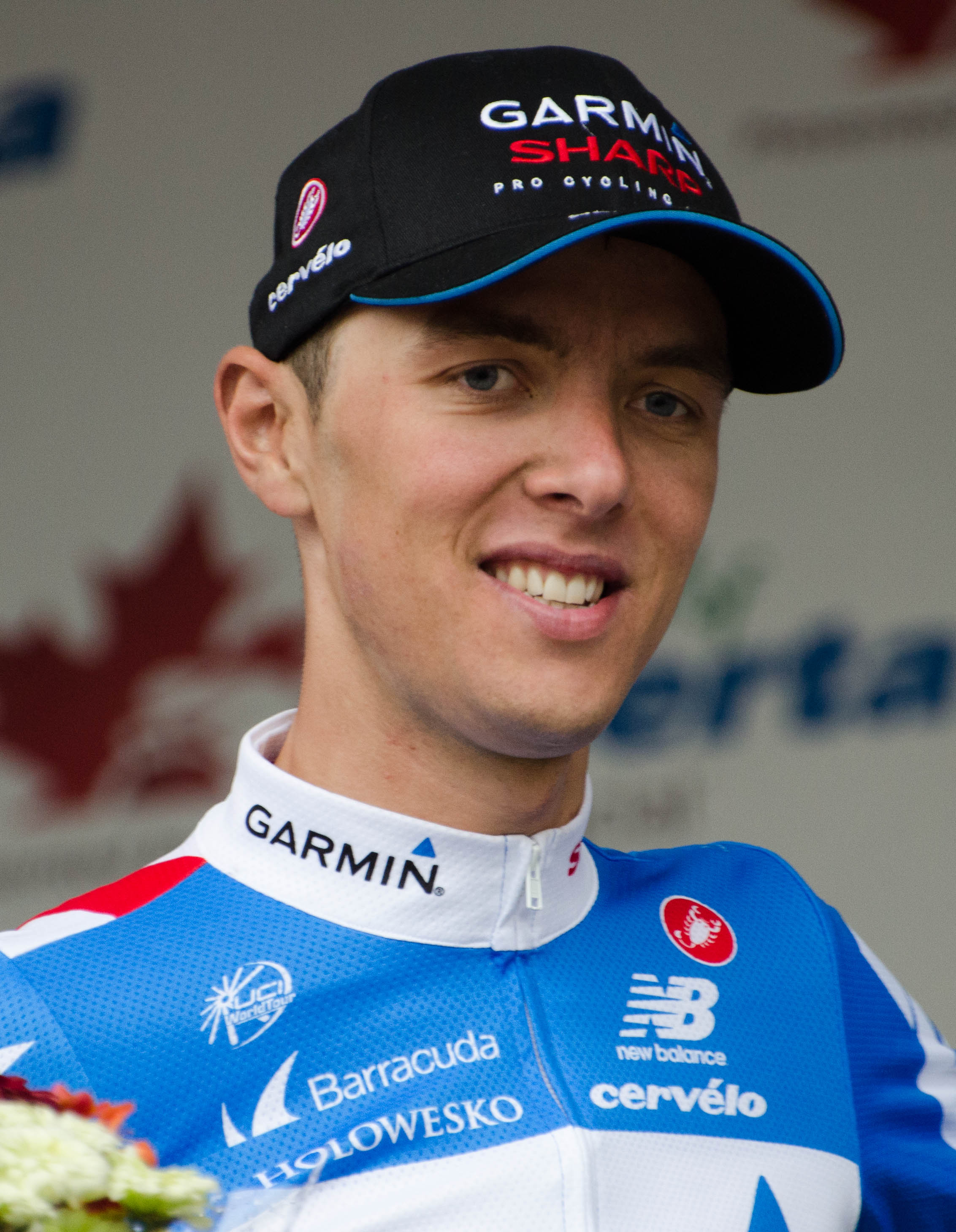
- Navardauskas at 2014 Tour of Alberta

Personal information
- Full name: Ramūnas Navardauskas
- Nickname: Honey Badger
- Born: 30 January 1988 (age 38): Šilalė, Lithuanian SSR, Soviet Union; (now Lithuania)
- Height: 1.90 m (6 ft 3 in)
- Weight: 77 kg (170 lb)

Cycling career
- Sport: Cycling
- Current team: Retired
- Disciplines: Road; Cyclo-cross
- Role: Rider (retired); Directeur sportif
- Rider type: All-rounder

Amateur teams
- 2007: Klaipeda–Splendid
- 2008: Ulan
- 2009: Team Piemonte
- 2010: Vélo-Club La Pomme Marseille

Professional teams
- 2011–2016: Garmin–Cervélo
- 2017–2018: Bahrain–Merida
- 2019–2020: Delko–Marseille Provence
- 2022: Voltas Cycling Team

Managerial team
- 2023: EF Education–Nippo Development Team

Major wins
- Grand Tours Tour de France 1 individual stage (2014) 1 TTT stage (2011) Giro d'Italia 1 individual stage (2013) 1 TTT stage (2012) One-day races and Classics National Road Race Championships (2007, 2011, 2016, 2019) National Time Trial Championships (2012, 2014, 2015)
Medal record
Men's road bicycle racing
Representing Lithuania
World Championships
Bronze medal – third place	2015 Richmond	Road race

Ramūnas Navardauskas (born 30 January 1988) is a Lithuanian former professional road racing cyclist, who rode professionally between 2011 and 2022 for Cannondale–Drapac, Bahrain–Merida, Nippo–Delko–One Provence and the Voltas Cycling Team. Following his retirement as a rider, Navardauskas worked as a directeur sportif for UCI Continental team EF Education–Nippo Development Team in 2023.

== Career ==
After four years in the amateur ranks, Navardauskas turned professional with Garmin–Cervélo in 2011.

During the 2012 Giro d'Italia, Navardauskas finished sixth in the opening individual time trial; twenty-two seconds shy of American Taylor Phinney (BMC Racing Team). In stage four's team time trial, Garmin–Barracuda were victorious, and Navardauskas took the race lead. He became the first Lithuanian to wear the pink jersey. However, Navardauskas lost the jersey to Italian Adriano Malori (Lampre–ISD) on stage six. In April 2015, Navardauskas won the Circuit de la Sarthe by a single second over Manuele Boaro, winning the race for the second consecutive year.

In September 2017 Navardauskas had a successful heart surgery for a cardiac arrhythmia.

== Personal life ==
Born in Šilalė, Navardauskas previously resided in Oliva, Valencian Community, Spain. In September 2017, he married fellow Lithuanian cyclist Gabrielė Jankutė, and the couple have two children – a son born in 2020, and a daughter born in 2024.

== Major results ==
2005
1st Time trial, National Junior Road Championships
10th Time trial, UCI Junior World Championships
2006
6th Time trial, UCI Junior World Championships
2007
National Road Championships

1st Road race
4th Time trial

7th Tartu GP
9th Overall Olympia's Tour
2008
4th Time trial, National Road Championships
4th Tallinn–Tartu GP
5th Mayor Cup
9th Riga Grand Prix
10th Overall Szlakiem Walk Majora Hubala
2009
3rd Time trial, National Road Championships
2010
1st Liège–Bastogne–Liège Espoirs
National Road Championships

2nd Road race
3rd Time trial

4th Overall Boucles de la Mayenne

1st Stage 3

4th Ronde van Vlaanderen Beloften
5th Overall Ronde de l'Isard

1st Stage 2

7th Paris–Roubaix Espoirs
2011
National Road Championships

1st Road race
2nd Time trial

1st Stage 2 (TTT) Tour de France
3rd Overall Ster ZLM Toer
7th Overall Circuit de la Sarthe
2012
National Road Championships

1st Time trial
3rd Road race

1st Stage 4 (TTT) Giro d'Italia
2nd Overall Danmark Rundt
8th Road race, UCI Road World Championships
8th Overall Tour of Qatar

1st Young rider classification
1st Stage 2 (TTT)

8th Overall Tour of Oman
2013
1st Stage 11 Giro d'Italia
1st Stage 2 Tour de Romandie
3rd Time trial, National Road Championships
2014
National Road Championships

1st Time trial
4th Road race

1st Overall Circuit de la Sarthe

1st Stage 4

1st Stage 19 Tour de France
3rd Grand Prix Cycliste de Québec
4th Overall Tour of Alberta

1st Points classification

4th Grand Prix Cycliste de Montréal
2015
National Road Championships

1st Time trial
2nd Road race

1st Overall Circuit de la Sarthe
3rd Road race, UCI Road World Championships
3rd GP Ouest-France
4th Overall Bayern Rundfahrt
2016
1st Road race, National Road Championships
4th Trofeo Felanitx-Ses Salines-Campos-Porreres
6th GP Industria & Artigianato di Larciano
7th Overall Ster ZLM Toer
8th Trofeo Playa de Palma
2017
7th Overall Vuelta a San Juan

1st Stage 3 (ITT)

2018
1st Overall Tour of Black Sea

1st Mountains classification
1st Stage 1

National Road Championships

2nd Road race
2nd Time trial

2nd Overall Baltic Chain Tour
3rd Overall Tour of Cappadocia

1st Points classification

2019
National Road Championships

1st Road race
3rd Time trial

2020
10th Overall La Tropicale Amissa Bongo

=== Grand Tour general classification results timeline ===
Grand Tour	2011	2012	2013	2014	2015	2016
Giro d'Italia	—	137	87	—	—	122
Tour de France	157	—	120	141	143	134
Vuelta a España	Did not contest during his career					

Legend
—	Did not compete
DNF	Did not finish

Awards
Preceded by Jevgenij Shuklin	Lithuanian Sportsman of the Year; 2015	Succeeded by Aurimas Didžbalis
