= Darijus Džervus =

Lithuanian cyclist (born 1990)

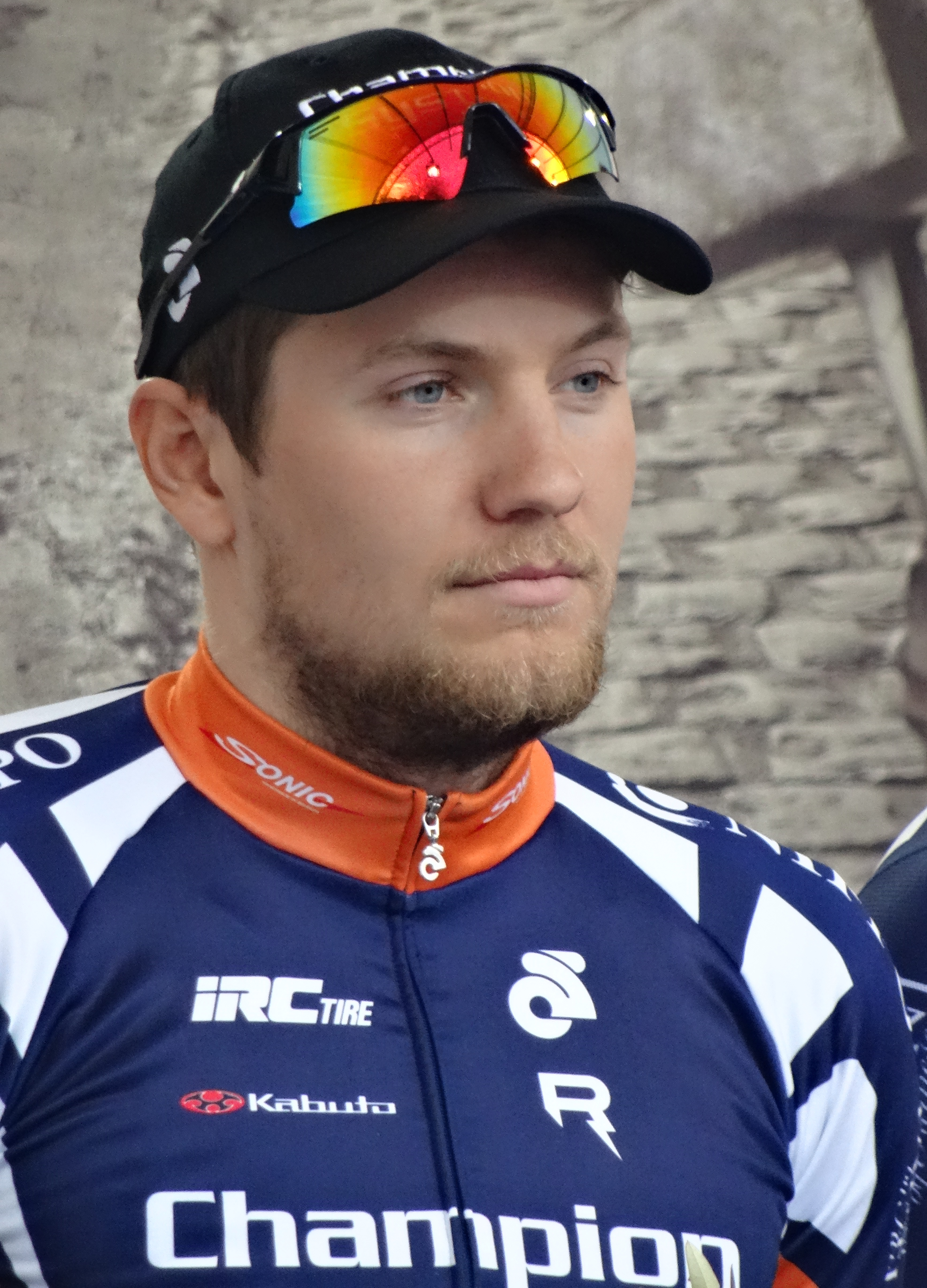
- Džervus at the 2015 Kuurne–Brussels–Kuurne.

Personal information
- Full name: Darijus Džervus
- Born: 20 July 1990 (age 36)
- Height: 1.87 m (6 ft 2 in)
- Weight: 77 kg (170 lb)

Cycling career
- Sport: Cycling
- Discipline: Road
- Role: Rider

Amateur teams
- 2010: Albert Bigot 79
- 2012: Bianchi–Lotto–Nieuwe Hoop Tielen

Professional teams
- 2011: An Post–Sean Kelly
- 2013–2014: Doltcini Flanders
- 2015: CCT p/b Champion System
- 2016: Staki–Baltik Vairas

Darijus Džervus (born 20 July 1990) is a Lithuanian cyclist who last rode for Staki–Baltik Vairas.

== Major results ==
2011
10th Beverbeek Classic
2012
1st Time trial, National Under-23 Road Championships
2013
9th Kampioenschap van Vlaanderen
2014
2nd Road race, National Road Championships
2016
1st Stage 2 Tour of Mersin
5th Grand Prix Minsk
7th Circuit d'Alger
7th Minsk Cup
9th Overall Baltic Chain Tour
9th GP de la Ville d'Oran
9th Memoriał Henryka Łasaka
2017
National Road Championships

3rd Road race
5th Time trial

8th Grand Prix Minsk
2018
1st Omnium, National Track Championships
