= Raimondas Vilčinskas =

Lithuanian cyclist

Personal information
- Full name: Raimondas Vilčinskas
- Born: 5 July 1977 (age 49) Panevėžys, Lithuanian SSR, Soviet Union
- Height: 1.84 m (6 ft 1/2 in)
- Weight: 80 kg (176 lb)

Cycling career
- Sport: Cycling
- Disciplines: Road, track
- Role: Rider
- Rider type: Pursuit

Professional teams
- 1999–2000: Palmans-Ideal
- 2001–2002: Mróz–Supradyn Witaminy
- 2005: Jartazi Granville Team

Major wins
- Lithuanian Road Cycling Championships (ITT) (2002)

Raimondas Vilčinskas (born 5 July 1977 in Panevėžys) is a retired Lithuanian professional road and track cyclist. He represented his nation Lithuania as part of the men's cycling squad in two editions of the Olympic Games (1996 and 2004), and later competed as a member of and a pro cycling rider for Palmans-Ideal, Mróz–Supradyn Witaminy, and Jartazi Granville Team, before his official retirement in late 2005.

Vilcinskas made his official debut as an amateur rider at the 1996 Summer Olympics in Atlanta, where he competed along with his fellow cyclists Linas Balčiūnas, Raimondas Rumšas, Remigijus Lupeikis, and Ivanas Romanovas in the men's road race, but did not finish the course. During his amateur career, Vilcinskas had awarded a silver medal in the same discipline at the 1997 Lithuanian championships, but turned himself into pro in 1999 with Belgium's Palmans-Legal cycling team, and thereby picked up his first career title at the Memorial Philippe Van Coningsloo.

When Palmans-Legal folded after the 2000 season, Vilcinskas signed a two-year contract with Poland's Mróz–Supradyn Witaminy. In 2002, he became a Lithuanian champion in the time trial at the elite tournament in Vilnius, before leaving his pro cycling team to turn his sights on the men's track team pursuit by the following year. In early 2004, Vilcinskas posted a fastest time of 4.05.305 to share his gold medals with Linas Balčiūnas, Aivaras Baranauskas, and Tomas Vaitkus during the final match against Ukraine in the men's team pursuit at the opening leg of the UCI World Cup Series in Moscow, Russia.

Eight years after competing in his last Olympics, Vilcinskas qualified for his second Lithuanian squad, as a 27-year-old, in the men's team pursuit at the 2004 Summer Olympics in Athens based on the nation's selection process from the UCI Track World Rankings. He delivered the Lithuanian foursome of Balčiūnas, Baranauskas, and Ignatas Konovalovas an eighth-place time of 4:08.812 in the prelims before his team was later relegated and overlapped to an aggressive Aussie squad of Graeme Brown, Brett Lancaster, Brad McGee, and Luke Roberts in the fourth match round.

== Career highlights ==
1997
2nd Lithuanian Championships (Road), Lithuania
1999
1st Antwerpse Havenpijl, Belgium
1st Memorial Philippe Van Coningsloo, Belgium
2001
3rd Stage 1, Tour of Poland, Sopot (POL)
2002
1st Lithuanian Championships (ITT), Lithuania
2nd Prologue, Tour de Normandie, Mondeville (FRA)
3rd Stage 4, Tour of Poland, Zielona Góra (POL)
2003
2nd Lithuanian Championships (ITT), Lithuania
2004
(gold) UCI World Cup (Team pursuit), Moscow (RUS)
2nd Lithuanian Championships (Road), Lithuania
8th Olympic Games (Team pursuit), Athens (GRE)
2005
2nd Stage 3, Tour de l'Eurometropole, Quiévrain (FRA)
