= Daiva Ragažinskienė =

Lithuanian cyclist

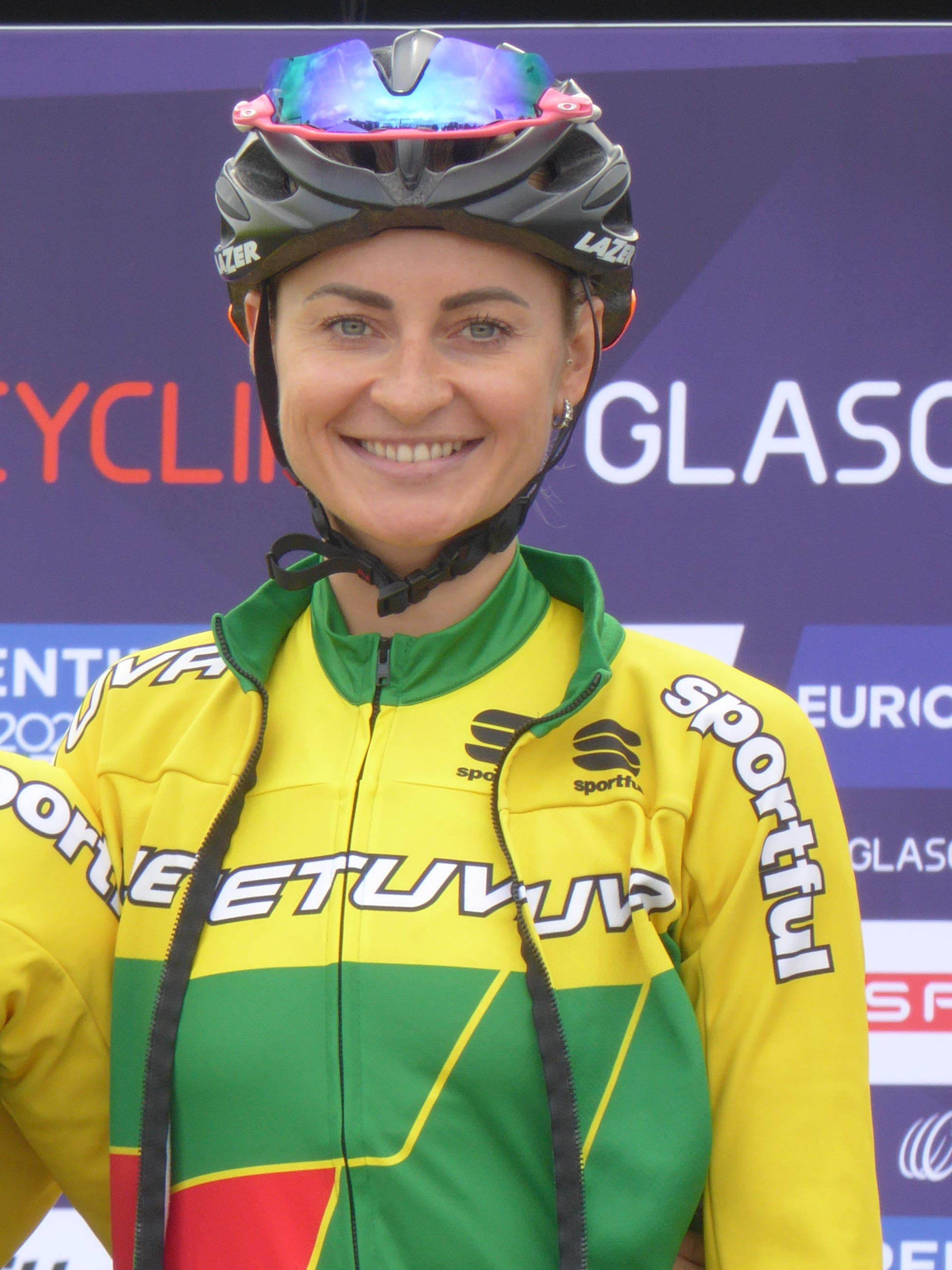
- Ragažinskienė at the 2018 European Road Cycling Championships.

Personal information
- Full name: Daiva Ragažinskienė
- Born: Daiva Tušlaitė; 18 June 1986 (age 40): Panevėžys, Lithuanian SSR, Soviet Union; (now Lithuania)

Cycling career
- Sport: Cycling
- Current team: Colibri Cycling
- Discipline: Road
- Role: Rider

Amateur team
- 2021–: Colibri Cycling

Professional teams
- 2007–2008: SC Michela Fanini Record Rox
- 2009: USC Chirio Forno d'Asolo
- 2014: Forno d'Asolo–Astute
- 2015–2016: Inpa Sottoli Giusfredi
- 2017–2018: Alé–Cipollini

Major wins
- One day races & Classics National Time Trial Championships (2008) National Road Race Championships (2015–2017)

Daiva Ragažinskienė (née Tušlaitė; born 18 June 1986) is a Lithuanian racing cyclist, who currently rides for Lithuanian amateur team Colibri Cycling. She competed in the 2013 UCI women's road race in Florence.

== Major results ==
2004
2nd Road race, National Road Championships
3rd Individual pursuit, UEC European Junior Track Championships
6th Road race, UCI Junior Road World Championships
2005
3rd Time trial, National Road Championships
3rd Overall Tour Cycliste Féminin International de l'Ardèche
2006
National Road Championships

2nd Time trial
7th Road race

5th Sparkassen Giro
10th Overall Trophée d'Or Féminin
2007
National Road Championships

2nd Time trial
7th Road race

2nd Boucle des Championnes
2nd Criterium des Championnes
2nd Trophée des Cyclistines
7th Trofeo Alfredo Binda-Comune di Cittiglio
9th Time trial, UEC European Under-23 Road Championships
2008
1st Time trial, National Road Championships
1st Young rider classification La Route de France
6th Overall Tour de Pologne Feminin

1st Stage 4 (ITT)

7th Time trial, UEC European Under-23 Road Championships
2009
2nd Lyon Montplaisir
7th Lyon Vaise
10th Road race, National Road Championships
2013
5th Road race, National Road Championships
2014
1st Slezanski Mnich - Sobótka
National Road Championships

2nd Time trial
4th Road race

2nd Omnium, Athens Track Grand Prix
3rd Dobromierz Kryterium
2015
National Road Championships

1st Road race
3rd Time trial

1st Trofeo Avis Suvereto
1st Points classification Trophée d'Or Féminin
1st Sprints classification Emakumeen Euskal Bira
Panevezys

2nd Points race
3rd Individual pursuit

4th Overall Giro della Toscana Int. Femminile – Memorial Michela Fanini
2016
National Road Championships

1st Road race
2nd Time trial

3rd Overall Trophée d'Or Féminin

1st Mountains classification

3rd Gran Premio Hotel Fiera Bolzano
4th Grand Prix de Plumelec-Morbihan
6th Trofee Maarten Wynants
6th SwissEver GP Cham-Hagendorn
10th Gooik–Geraardsbergen–Gooik
2017
1st Road race, National Road Championships
1st Sprints classification Ladies Tour of Norway
2018
National Road Championships

1st Time trial
3rd Road race

9th Veenendaal–Veenendaal Classic
