= Venantas Lašinis =

Lithuanian cyclist (born 1997)

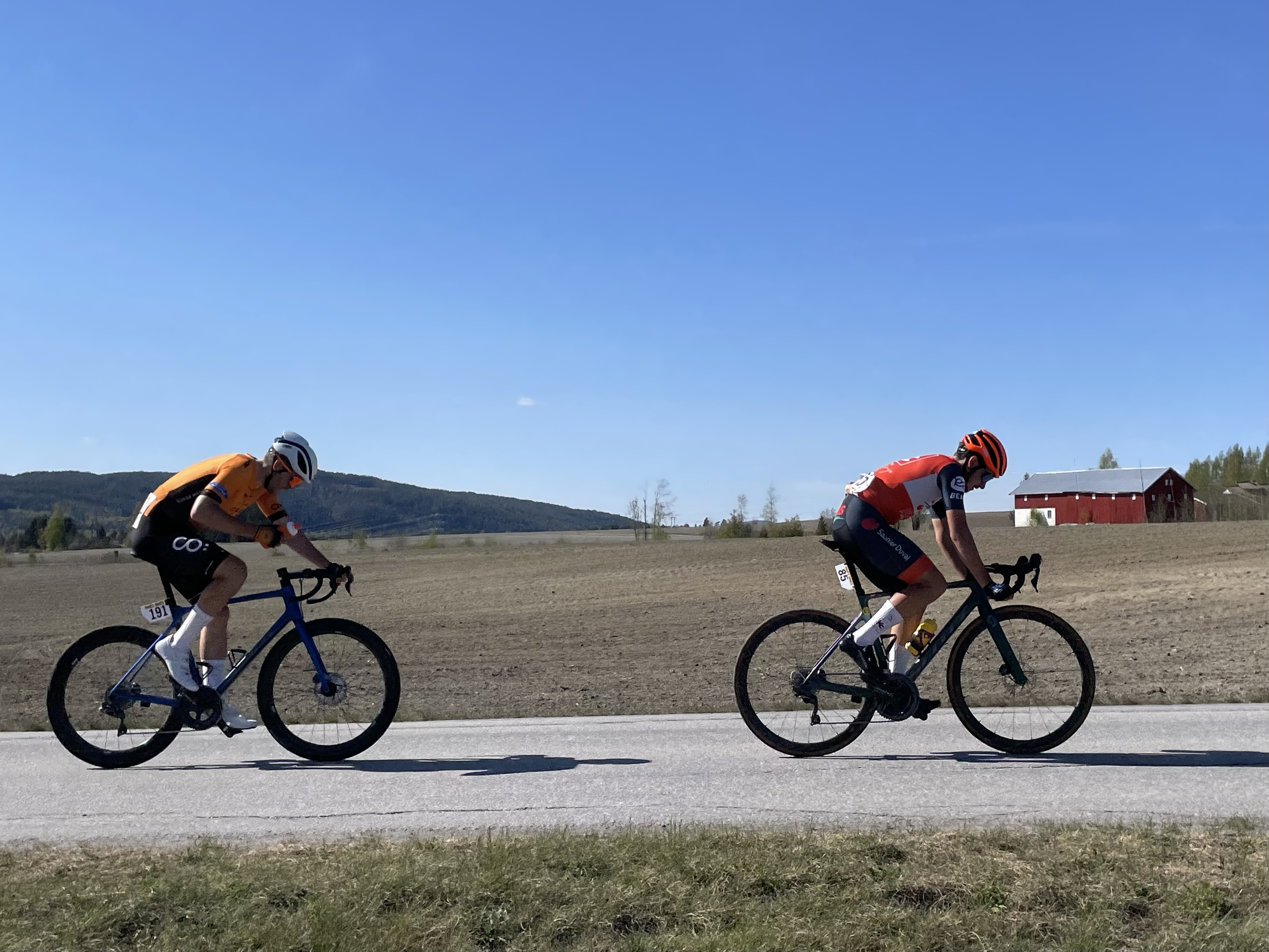
- Lašinis (in front), Ringerike Grand Prix 2022.

Personal information
- Born: 26 February 1997 (age 29)
- Height: 1.79 m (5 ft 10 in)
- Weight: 69 kg (152 lb)

Cycling career
- Sport: Cycling
- Current team: Kaunas Cycling Team
- Disciplines: Road; Track; Cyclo-cross
- Role: Rider

Amateur teams
- 2015: PKKSC SK "Fortūna"
- 2019–2020: Klaipėda CT

Professional teams
- 2016–2018: Staki–Baltik Vairas
- 2021: Lviv Cycling Team
- 2022–: Kaunas Cycling Team

Venantas Lašinis (born 26 February 1997) is a Lithuanian cyclist, who currently rides for UCI Continental team Energus Cycling Team.

== Major results ==
=== Road ===
2015
2nd Road race, National Junior Road Championships
2016
National Under-23 Road Championships

3rd Time trial
4th Road race

2017
1st Time trial, National Under-23 Road Championships
5th Road race, National Road Championships
9th Overall Baltic Chain Tour
2018
2nd Time trial, National Under-23 Road Championships
3rd Overall Tour of Iran (Azerbaijan)

1st Young rider classification

7th Overall Carpathian Couriers Race
9th Minsk Cup
2019
National Under-23 Road Championships

2nd Road race
2nd Time trial

3rd Road race, National Road Championships
4th Overall Carpathian Couriers Race
7th Grand Prix Minsk
2020
National Road Championships

2nd Road race
3rd Time trial

2021
3rd Time trial, National Road Championships
2022
1st Road race, Baltic Road Championships
National Road Championships

1st Road race
3rd Time trial

9th Overall Baltic Chain Tour
2023
National Road Championships

2nd Road race
2nd Time trial

=== Track ===
2017
National Championships

1st Individual pursuit
1st Points race

2018
National Championships

1st Individual pursuit
1st Scratch
2nd Points race

2019
National Championships

1st Points race
1st Scratch
3rd Individual pursuit
3rd Elimination race

2021
National Championships

1st Team pursuit
2nd Scratch
3rd Team sprint

=== Cyclo-cross ===
2019–2020
2nd National Championships
2020–2021
2nd National Championships
2021–2022
1st National Championships
2023–2024
1st National Championships
