= Paulius Šiškevičius =

Lithuanian racing cyclist (born 1993)

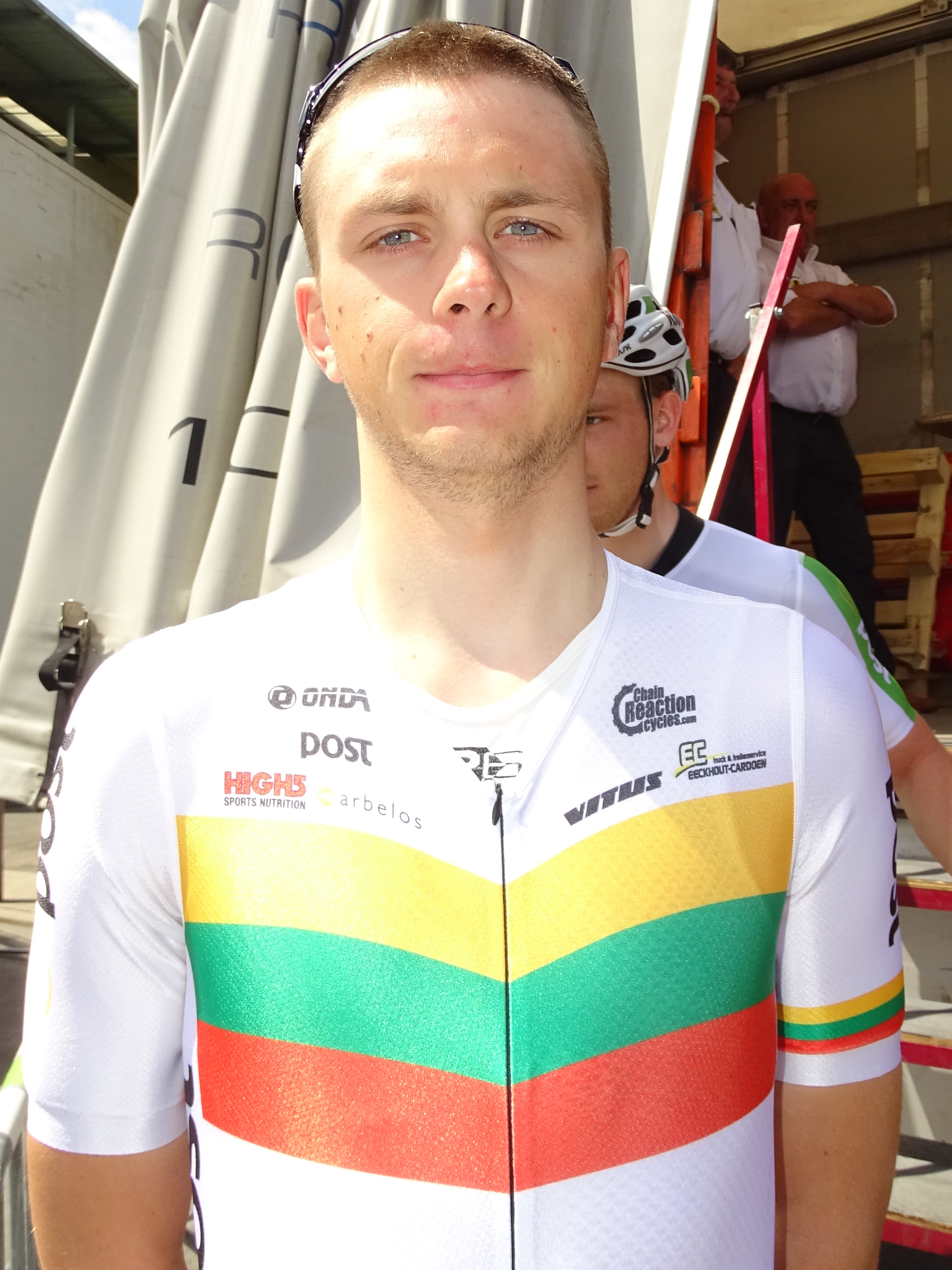
- Šiškevičius at the 2015 Memorial Van Coningsloo

Personal information
- Full name: Paulius Šiškevičius
- Born: 7 September 1993 (age 33) Vilnius, Lithuania
- Height: 1.83 m (6 ft 0 in)
- Weight: 70 kg (154 lb)

Cycling career
- Sport: Cycling
- Current team: Retired
- Discipline: Road
- Role: Rider
- Rider type: Rouleur

Amateur teams
- 2012–2013: AVC Aix-en-Provence
- 2014: Sojasun espoir–ACNC

Professional teams
- 2014: Team La Pomme Marseille 13 (stagiaire)
- 2015: An Post–Chain Reaction
- 2016–2018: Staki–Baltik Vairas

Paulius Šiškevičius (born 7 September 1993 in Vilnius) is a retired Lithuanian road racing cyclist. He was the 2014 Lithuanian National Road Race Champion and won a stage at the 2017 Tour du Maroc.

== Major results ==
2010
National Junior Road Championships

1st Road race
1st Time trial

2011
National Junior Road Championships

1st Road race
1st Time trial

2012
1st Road race, National Under-23 Road Championships
2013
1st Road race, National Under-23 Road Championships
2014
1st Road race, National Road Championships
2015
National Under-23 Road Championships

1st Road race
1st Time trial

10th Omloop van het Waasland
2016
National Road Championships

2nd Time trial
3rd Road race

4th Overall Tour d'Oranie
7th Overall Tour de Blida
2017
1st Stage 8 Tour du Maroc
6th Road race, National Road Championships
2018
6th Time trial, National Road Championships
