= Linas Balčiūnas =

Lithuanian cyclist (born 1978)

Personal information
- Born: 14 February 1978 (age 48) Jonava, Lithuania
- Height: 1.96 m (6 ft 5 in)
- Weight: 90 kg (198 lb)

Cycling career
- Sport: Cycling
- Current team: Retired
- Disciplines: Road; Track
- Role: Rider

Amateur teams
- 1996: Sidabrine Strele
- 2004: Sidabrine Strele

Professional teams
- 1999–2000: Saint-Quentin–Oktos–MBK
- 2001–2002: AG2R Prévoyance
- 2003: MBK–Oktos–Saint-Quentin
- 2005–2007: Agritubel–Loudun
- 2008: Ulan

Linas Balčiūnas (born 14 February 1978 in Jonava) is a Lithuanian former road and track cyclist, who represented Lithuania at 1996 and 2004 Summer Olympics.

During the 2004 UCI Track Cycling World Cup Classics, he won a gold medal at the Moscow Cup with the national pursuit team. Balčiūnas participated at 2005 UCI Road World Championships, where he achieved 43rd place in the time trial.

== Major results ==
1997
3rd Road race, National Road Championships
1998
1st Stage 3 Tour of Rhodes
3rd Tour Beneden-Maas
1999
1st Chrono Champenois
3rd Tour de la Somme
2000
1st Stage 1b Tour de l'Ain
2nd Henk Vos Memorial
2nd Omloop van het Houtland
3rd Time trial, National Road Championships
6th Overall Tour de Normandie
7th Overall Tour du Limousin
2001
2nd Time trial, National Road Championships
3rd Overall Tour de Picardie

1st Stage 3a

2005
3rd Overall Tour of Belgium
3rd Overall Tour du Poitou Charentes

1st Stage 4a

7th GP de Fourmies
7th Châteauroux Classic
8th Tro-Bro Léon
2008
1st Stage 4 Dookoła Mazowsza
