= Gediminas Bagdonas =

Lithuanian road racing cyclist

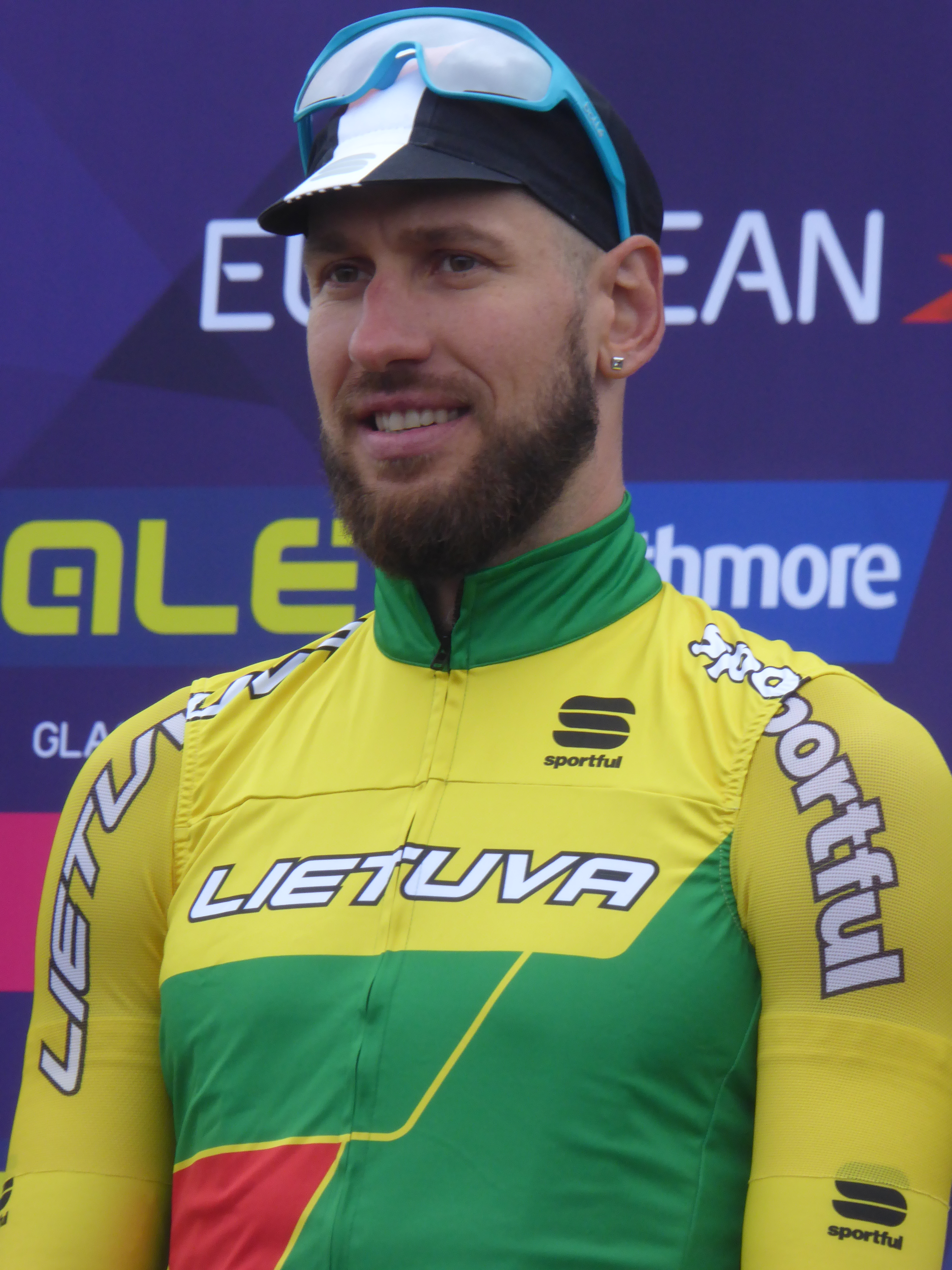
- Bagdonas at the 2018 European Road Cycling Championships

Personal information
- Full name: Gediminas Bagdonas
- Nickname: Bagdo
- Born: 26 December 1985 (age 40) Mantviliškis, Lithuanian SSR (now Lithuania)
- Height: 1.85 m (6 ft 1 in)
- Weight: 78 kg (172 lb; 12.3 st)

Cycling career
- Sport: Cycling
- Current team: Retired
- Disciplines: Road; Track
- Role: Rider; Directeur sportif
- Rider type: All-rounder

Amateur teams
- 2005–2006: Team Klaipeda
- 2020: Klaipeda Cycling Team

Professional teams
- 2007: Klaipeda–Splendid Cycling Team
- 2008: Ulan
- 2009: Team Piemonte
- 2011–2012: An Post–Sean Kelly
- 2013–2019: Ag2r–La Mondiale

Managerial teams
- 2022: Kaunas Cycling Team
- 2023–2024: Tartu2024 Cycling Team

Major wins
- One-day races and Classics National Road Race Championships (2012, 2018) National Time Trial Championships (2007, 2011, 2018–2020)
Medal record
Representing Lithuania
Men's track cycling
European Championships
Silver medal – second place	2006 Athens	Under-23 individual pursuit
Bronze medal – third place	2012 Panevėžys	Omnium
Bronze medal – third place	2005 Fiorenzuola	Under-23 team pursuit
Bronze medal – third place	2006 Athens	Under-23 team pursuit
Bronze medal – third place	2003 Moscow	Junior team pursuit

Gediminas Bagdonas (born 26 December 1985) is a Lithuanian former professional road racing cyclist, who competed professionally between 2007 and 2019 for the Klaipeda–Splendid, Ulan, Team Piemonte, An Post–Sean Kelly and AG2R La Mondiale teams. He was named in the start list for the 2015 Vuelta a España. Following his retirement, Bagdonas has worked as a directeur sportif for UCI Continental teams Kaunas Cycling Team and Voltas–Tartu 2024 by CCN, and since 2023, he is one of the coaches of the Lithuanian national track team.

== Major results ==
2003
3rd Team pursuit, UEC European Junior Track Championships
2004
3rd Time trial, National Road Championships
2005
3rd Team pursuit, UEC European Under-23 Track Championships
3rd Overall Olympia's Tour

1st Young rider classification

7th La Côte Picarde
2006
UEC European Under-23 Track Championships

2nd Individual pursuit
3rd Team pursuit

2nd Time trial, National Road Championships
2007
1st Time trial, National Road Championships
1st Overall Triptyque des Barrages

1st Mountains classification
1st Stage 2 (ITT)

5th E.O.S. Tallinn GP
7th Overall Okolo Slovenska
7th Beverbeek Classic
7th Schaal Sels
2008
5th Overall Dookoła Mazowsza
6th Tartu GP
8th Overall Five Rings of Moscow
2009
1st Memorial Van Coningsloo
2nd Road race, National Road Championships
3rd Individual pursuit, 2009–10 UCI Track Cycling World Cup Classics, Cali
8th Grand Prix Criquielion
2010
4th Tartu GP
2011
National Road Championships

1st Time trial
2nd Road race

1st Overall An Post Rás

1st Stages 2 & 4

1st Overall Ronde de l'Oise

1st Stage 2

1st Stage 7 Tour of Britain
7th Overall Baltic Chain Tour

1st Prologue & Stage 1

2012
National Road Championships

1st Road race
3rd Time trial

1st Overall Baltic Chain Tour

1st Stages 2, 4 & 5

1st Ronde van Noord-Holland
1st Memorial Van Coningsloo
2nd Rund um Köln
2nd Omloop der Kempen
3rd Omnium, UEC European Track Championships
3rd Omloop van het Waasland
5th Zellik–Galmaarden
7th Handzame Classic
8th Overall Driedaagse van West-Vlaanderen
9th Overall An Post Rás

1st Points classification
1st Stages 3 & 8

2013
2nd Time trial, National Road Championships
2014
1st Sprints classification Four Days of Dunkirk
3rd Time trial, National Road Championships
8th Cholet-Pays de Loire
2015
2nd Time trial, National Road Championships
6th Paris–Bourges
10th Grand Prix de la Somme
2016
6th Grand Prix de la Somme
2017
National Road Championships

2nd Time trial
2nd Road race

8th Overall Tour du Poitou-Charentes
2018
National Road Championships

1st Road race
1st Time trial

5th Overall Boucles de la Mayenne
5th Le Samyn
6th Overall Tour Poitou-Charentes en Nouvelle-Aquitaine
2019
1st Time trial, National Road Championships
5th Time trial, European Games
2020
National Road Championships

1st Road race
2nd Time trial

=== Grand Tour general classification results timeline ===
Grand Tour	2015	2016
Giro d'Italia	—	—
Tour de France	—	—
Vuelta a España	154	134

Legend
—	Did not compete
DNF	Did not finish
