= Antwerpse Havenpijl =

Belgian cycling race

Race details
- Date: August
- Region: Flemish Region, Belgium
- Discipline: Road
- Competition: UCI Europe Tour
- Type: Single-day
- Web site: helpmijnpc.be/rab2/

History
- First edition: 1990
- Editions: 28 (as of 2019)
- First winner: Glenn Huybrechts (BEL)
- Most wins: Jan Van Immerseel (BEL); Tibo Nevens (BEL) : (2 wins)
- Most recent: Tibo Nevens (BEL)

The Antwerpse Havenpijl is a European bicycle race held in Merksem, Belgium. Since 2006, the race has been organised as a 1.2 event on the UCI Europe Tour.

== Winners ==
Year	Country	Rider	Team
1990	Belgium	Glenn Huybrechts	
1991	Belgium	Michel Vanhaecke	
1992	Belgium	Stefan Sels	
1993	Belgium	Rik Claeys	
1994	Belgium	Gilbert Kaes	
1995	Belgium	Jan Van Immerseel	
1996	Belgium	Johnny Dauwe	
1997	Belgium	Jan Van Immerseel	
1998	Lithuania	Darius Strole	
1999	Lithuania	Raimondas Vilcinskas	Palmans-Ideal
2000	No race		
2001	Belgium	Michel Van Haecke	Landbouwkrediet–Colnago
2002	Australia	Mark Roland	Palmans–Collstrop
2003	Belgium	Hans De Meester	
2004	Belgium	Peter Ronsse	
2005	No race		
2006	Lithuania	Vytautas Kaupas	Jartazi–7Mobile
2007	France	Denis Flahaut	Jartazi–Promo Fashion
2008	Denmark	Jonas Aaen Jørgensen	Team GLS-Pakke Shop
2009	Denmark	Jens Erik Madsen	Team Capinordic
2010	Belgium	Rob Goris	Palmans Cras
2011	Switzerland	Pirmin Lang	Atlas Personal
2012	Belgium	Joeri Stallaert	Landbouwkrediet–Euphony
2013	Belgium	Preben Van Hecke	Topsport Vlaanderen–Baloise
2014	Netherlands	Yoeri Havik	Cyclingteam de Rijke
2015	Lithuania	Aidis Kruopis	An Post–Chain Reaction
2016	Belgium	Timothy Dupont	Verandas Willems
2017	Netherlands	Arvid de Kleijn	Baby-Dump Cycling Team
2018	Belgium	Tibo Nevens	
2019	Belgium	Tibo Nevens	
