= Evaldas Šiškevičius =

Lithuanian cyclist

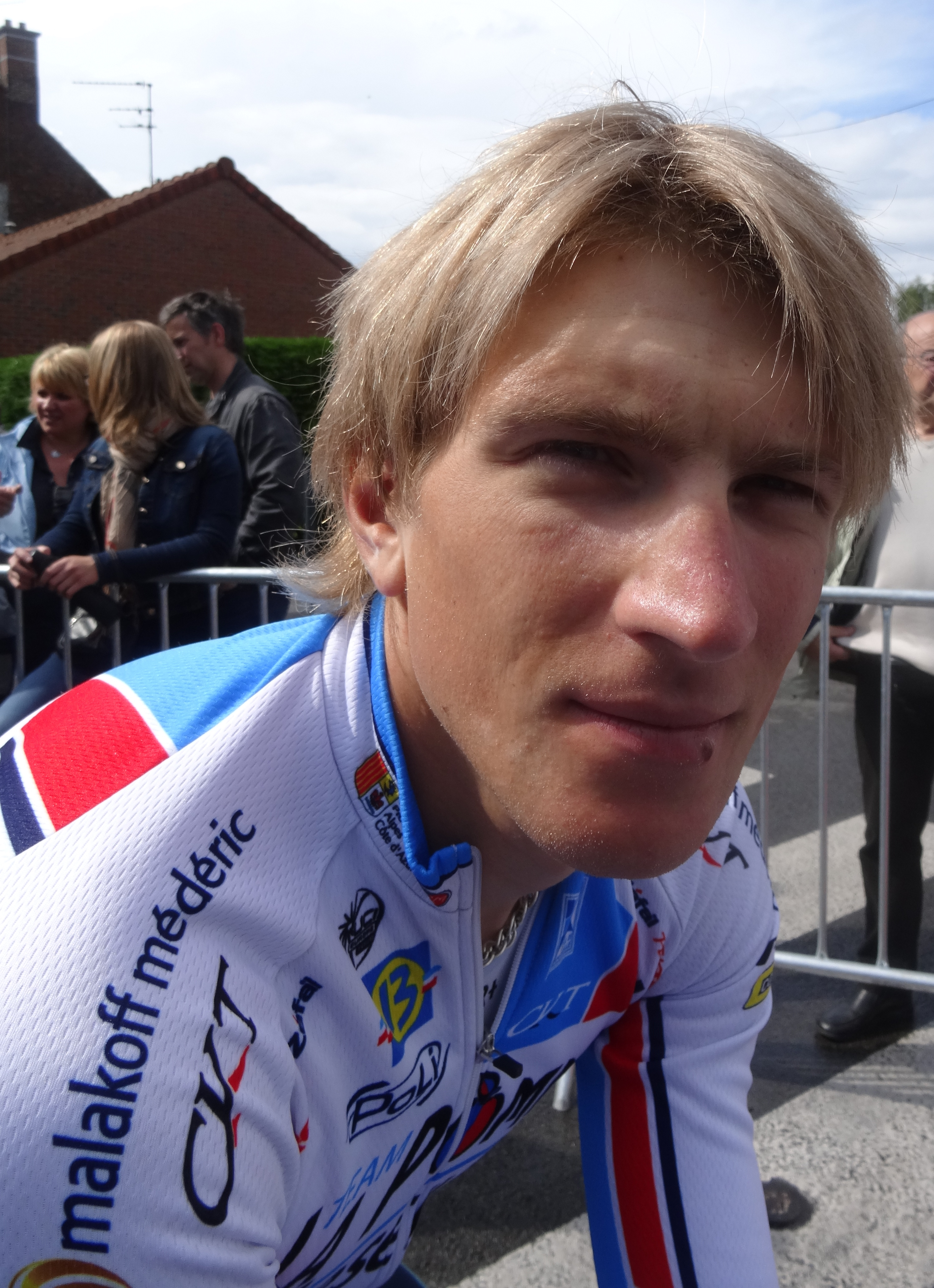
- Šiškevičius in 2014.

Personal information
- Full name: Evaldas Šiškevičius
- Born: 30 December 1988 (age 37): Vilnius, Lithuanian SSR; (now Lithuania)
- Height: 1.81 m (5 ft 11 in)
- Weight: 76 kg (168 lb)

Cycling career
- Sport: Cycling
- Current team: Retired
- Disciplines: Road; Mountain biking
- Role: Rider; Directeur sportif
- Rider type: Rouleur

Amateur teams
- 2008–2010: Vélo-Club La Pomme Marseille
- 2008: Crédit Agricole (stagiaire)

Professional teams
- 2011–2012: La Pomme Marseille
- 2013: Sojasun
- 2014–2021: Team La Pomme Marseille 13
- 2022: Go Sport–Roubaix–Lille Métropole

Managerial team
- 2023–: AVC Aix-en-Provence

Major wins
- One-day races and Classics National Time Trial Championships (2020, 2021)
Medal record
Representing Lithuania
Men's road bicycle racing
World University Cycling Championship
| Bronze medal – third place | 2008 Nijmegen | Time trial |

Evaldas Šiškevičius (born 30 December 1988) is a Lithuanian former professional road bicycle racer and mountain biker, who competed professionally from 2011 to 2022. He competed at the 2020 Olympic Games and had a top-ten finish at Paris-Roubaix in 2019.

== Career ==
Born in Vilnius, Šiškevičius has competed as a professional since the start of the 2011 season, as the La Pomme Marseille team he had been a member successfully became a Continental team. Šiškevičius won the Volta ao Alentejo in 2011 – as well as a stage during the event – before winning the Grand Prix de la Somme in September 2012.

Šiškevičius left La Pomme Marseille at the end of the 2012 season, and joined Sojasun for the 2013 season. Šiškevičius returned to Team La Pomme Marseille 13 for the 2014 season, after Sojasun folded at the end of 2013.

At the 2018 Paris–Roubaix, Šiškevičius finished the race over an hour after the winner, Peter Sagan. He arrived so far outside of the time limit that when he arrived at the finish at the velodrome, the gates had already been closed, however, they were opened so that he could complete a ceremonious lap, despite his result still being marked as DNF. However, at the 2019 edition of the race, he managed to finish in 9th place.

At the 2021 Lithuanian Road Cycling Championship, he won the individual time trial and finished in third place in the road race. He subsequently represented Lithuania at the delayed 2020 Olympic Games, held in Tokyo, Japan in 2021. For the 2022 season he joined the Go Sport–Roubaix–Lille Métropole team.

== Personal life ==
He attended Barbora Radvilaitė Secondary School, where he was a contemporary of fellow future Olympic cyclist for Lithuania Rasa Leleivytė.

== Major results ==
2005
2nd Time trial, National Junior Road Championships
3rd Trofee van Vlaanderen Reningelst
2006
National Mountain Bike Championships

1st Junior cross-country
2nd Cross-country

1st Omloop Het Volk Junior
2nd Overall Sint-Martinusprijs Kontich
9th Road race, UEC European Junior Road Championships
2007
National Road Championships

3rd Time trial
3rd Under-23 time trial

3rd Cross-country, National Mountain Bike Championships
2008
1st Grand Prix de la ville de Nogent-sur-Oise
3rd Time trial, World University Championships
3rd Time trial, National Road Championships
10th La Côte Picarde
2009
2nd Time trial, National Road Championships
3rd Circuit Méditerranéen
5th Time trial, UEC European Under-23 Road Championships
2010
1st Overall Boucle de l'Artois

1st Stage 1

2nd Time trial, National Road Championships
2011
1st Overall Volta ao Alentejo

1st Stage 3

National Road Championships

3rd Time trial
5th Road race

3rd Overall Tour de Bretagne
8th Jūrmala Grand Prix
2012
1st Grand Prix de la Somme
1st Stage 5 Tour de Bretagne
1st Stage 2 Tour du Limousin
5th Time trial, National Road Championships
5th Châteauroux Classic
2013
3rd Road race, National Road Championships
2014
9th Grand Prix d'Ouverture La Marseillaise
2015
1st Overall Tour of Yancheng Coastal Wetlands

1st Points classification
1st Stage 1

1st Overall Circuit des Ardennes

1st Stage 3 (TTT)

3rd Overall Tour de Picardie

1st Points classification

National Road Championships

4th Time trial
4th Road race

4th Overall Tour of Taihu Lake
10th Paris–Camembert
2016
5th Time trial, National Road Championships
2017
National Road Championships

4th Time trial
4th Road race

2018
National Road Championships

3rd Time trial
3rd Road race

2019
2nd Time trial, National Road Championships
7th Paris–Bourges
9th Paris–Roubaix
9th Grand Prix d'Isbergues
2020
1st Time trial, National Road Championships
2021
National Road Championships

1st Time trial
3rd Road race

5th Overall Baltic Chain Tour
5th Paris–Troyes
10th Overall Tour of Estonia
2022
1st Overall Tour of Estonia
National Road Championships

2nd Time trial
5th Road race
