= Vladimir Smirnov (cyclist) =

Lithuanian cyclist (born 1978)

Personal information
- Born: 13 April 1978 (age 48) Klaipėda, Lithuania

Cycling career
- Sport: Cycling
- Current team: Retired
- Discipline: Road
- Role: Rider

Professional teams
- 1999-2000: Palmans-Ideal
- 2001: CCC-Mat
- 2002: Team Colpack-Astro
- 2007: Cinelli-Endeka-OPD

Vladimir Smirnov (born 13 April 1978 in Klaipėda) is a former Lithuanian cyclist.

== Palmares ==
2000
National Road Race Champion
2001
1st Gran Premio Nobili Rubinetterie
3rd National Road Race Championships
