= 2007 European Road Championships – Women's under-23 time trial =

Women's U23 individual time trial
2007 European Road Championships
- UEC European Champion jersey

Race details
- Dates: 19 July 2007 in Sofia (BUL)
- Stages: 1
- Distance: 24 km (14.91 mi)
- Winning time: 33' 54"

Results
	Winner	Linda Villumsen (DEN)	(Denmark)
	Second	Svitlana Halyuk (UKR)	(Ukraine)
	Third	Martina Sáblíková (CZE)	(Czech Republic)

The women's U23 individual time trial at the 2007 European Road Championships took place on 19 July. The Championships were hosted by the Bulgarian city of Sofia. The course was 24 km long and the race started in the morning.

== Final classification ==
Rank	Rider	Time
1st place, gold medalist(s)	Linda Villumsen (DEN)	33' 54s
2nd place, silver medalist(s)	Svitlana Halyuk (UKR)	+ 37s
3rd place, bronze medalist(s)	Martina Sáblíková (CZE)	+ 45s
4	Trine Schmidt (DEN)	+ 46s
5	Ellen van Dijk (NED)	+ 55s
6	Lesya Kalytovska (UKR)	+ 58s
7	Alexandra Sontheimer (GER)	+ 1m 03s
8	Regina Bruins (NED)	+ 1m 09s
9	Daiva Tušlaitė (LTU)	+ 1m 15s
10	Bianca Knöpfle (GER)	+ 1m 22s
11	Jarmila Machačová (CZE)	+ 1m 34s
12	Iris Slappendel (NED)	+ 1m 48s
13	Alexandra Burchenkova (RUS)	+ 1m 50s
14	Joanna Rowsell (GBR)	+ 2m 01s
15	Victoria Kondel (RUS)	+ 2m 07s
16	Aušrinė Trebaitė (LTU)	+ 2m 07s
17	Andrea Wölfer (SUI)	+ 2m 07s
18	Magdalena Zamolska (POL)	+ 2m 26s
19	Pascale Jeuland (FRA)	+ 2m 33s
20	Florence Girardet (FRA)	+ 2m 39s
