= Mitsubishi–Jartazi =

Professional cycling team

Team information
- UCI code: JAR (2004–2007); MIT (2008)
- Registered: Belgium (2004–2007); Estonia (2008)
- Founded: 2004
- Disbanded: 2008
- Discipline: Road

Key personnel
- General manager: Patrick Stallaert

Team name history
- 2004 2005 2006 2007 2008: Jartazi Granville Team; Jartazi Granville Team; Jartazi-7Mobile; Jartazi-Promo Fashion; Mitsubishi-Jartazi
Mitsubishi–Jartazi jersey
Jersey

Mitsubishi–Jartazi was a professional cycling team based in Belgium from 2004 until 2007 and Estonia in 2008. It started as a Division III team in 2004, made the transition to UCI Continental in 2005 and became UCI Professional Continental in 2008. The team was managed by Patrick Stallaert. The sponsor, Jartazi, went on to sponsor Revor-Jartazi Cyclingteam in 2009.

== Major wins ==
2004
Vlaamse Havenpijl, Peter Ronsse
2005
Stage 2b Le Triptyque des Monts et Châteaux, Michael Blanchy
Stage 2 Tour de l'Ain, Leonardo Duque
Druivenkoers Overijse, Leonardo Duque
2006
Stage 3 La Tropicale Amissa Bongo, Michael Blanchy
United Kingdom Road Race Championship, Hamish Haynes
Internatie Reningelst, Robby Meul
Stage 2 Tour de l'Ain, Igor Abakoumov
Vlaamse Havenpijl, Vytautas Kaupas
2007
Stage 4 Tour de Picardie, Janek Tombak
Neuseen Classics, Denis Flahaut
Stage 3 OZ Wielerweekend, Denis Flahaut
Delta Profronde, Denis Flahaut
Stage 3 Boucles de la Mayenne, Janek Tombak
Halle–Ingooigem, Janek Tombak
Vlaamse Havenpijl, Denis Flahaut
GP de Beuvry-la-Forêt, Vytautas Kaupas
2008
La Tropicale Amissa Bongo, Maxime Vantomme
Stage 2 Étoile de Bessèges, Stefan Van Dijk
GP Cholet, Janek Tombak
Prologue Delta Tour Zeeland, Jens Mouris
Nationale Sluitingsprijs, Hans Dekkers
