= Aivaras Mikutis =

Lithuanian cyclist (born 2002)

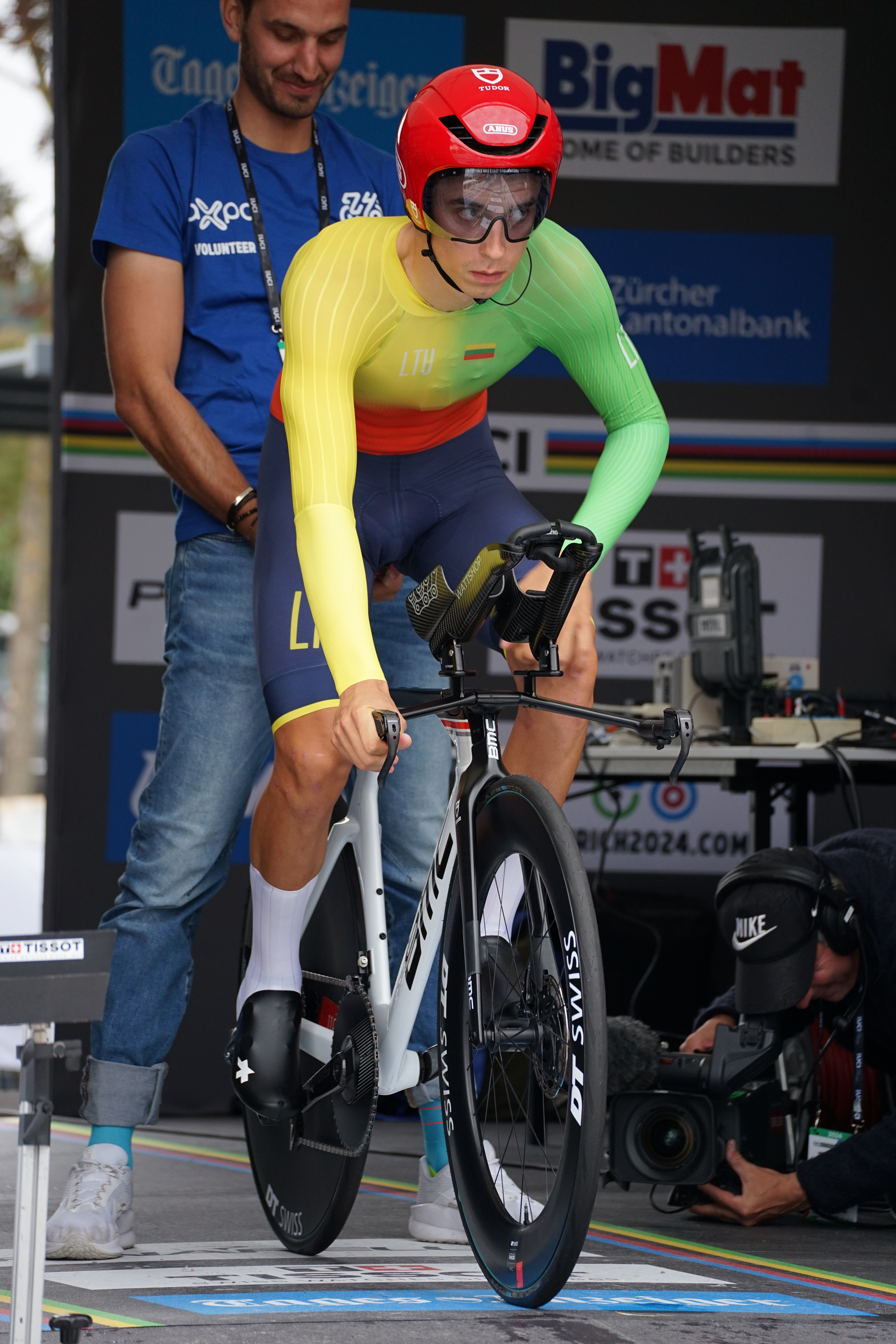
- Mikutis in 2024

Personal information
- Born: 16 September 2002 (age 24) Kvėdarna, Lithuania
- Height: 1.84 m (6 ft 0 in)

Cycling career
- Sport: Cycling
- Current team: Tudor Pro Cycling Team
- Disciplines: Road; Track
- Role: Rider
- Rider type: Time trialist

Amateur team
- 2020: Silale SM / Kvedarn

Professional teams
- 2021–2022: Tartu2024 Cycling Team
- 2023–2024: Tudor Pro Cycling Team U23
- 2025–: Tudor Pro Cycling Team

Major wins
- One-day races and Classics National Time Trial Championships (2022, 2023)

Aivaras Mikutis (born 16 September 2002) is a Lithuanian professional racing cyclist, who currently rides for UCI ProTeam Tudor Pro Cycling Team.

== Major results ==
2019
1st Time trial, National Junior Road Championships
2020
National Junior Road Championships

1st Time trial
5th Road race

2021
1st Road race, National Under-23 Road Championships
National Road Championships

2nd Road race
2nd Time trial

2022
National Road Championships

1st Time trial
2nd Road race

1st Road race, National Under-23 Road Championships
3rd Overall Flanders Tomorrow Tour
3rd Grand Prix de la Somme
5th Grand Prix Manavgat-Side
10th Grand Prix Gazipaşa
2023
National Road Championships

1st Time trial
5th Road race

5th Time trial, UEC European Under-23 Road Championships
7th Overall Carpathian Couriers Race
7th Chrono des Nations Under-23
2024
2nd Road race, National Road Championships
2nd Road race, National Under-23 Road Championships
4th Overall West Bohemia Tour
6th Time trial, UEC European Under-23 Road Championships
7th Overall Tour de la Mirabelle
