= Darius Strolė =

Lithuanian cyclist (born 1974)

Darius Strole
Personal information
- Born: 20 May 1974 (age 52) Vilnius, Lithuania

Cycling career
- Sport: Cycling
- Current team: Retired
- Discipline: Road
- Role: Rider

Amateur team
- 1998: Ipso–Euroclean (stagiaire)

Professional teams
- 1999–2000: Palmans–Ideal
- 2005: Drukkerij Van Lijsebetten–Bodyrepair–Bikeland

Darius Strole (born 20 May 1974) is a Lithuanian former professional racing cyclist.

== Major results ==
1997
1st National Road Race Championships
1998
1st Antwerpse Havenpijl
3rd National Road Race Championships
2000
2nd National Time Trial Championships
2003
2nd Antwerpse Havenpijl
2004
1st Overall Tour de Liège
1st Grand Prix Etienne De Wilde
