= Saulius Ruškys =

Lithuanian cyclist (born 1974)

Personal information
- Born: 18 April 1974 (age 52) Klaipėda, Lithuania

Cycling career
- Sport: Cycling
- Current team: Retired
- Discipline: Road
- Role: Rider
- Rider type: Sprinter

Amateur team
- 1998: VC Saint-Quentin

Professional teams
- 1999–2000: Saint-Quentin–Oktos–MBK
- 2001–2002: Gerolsteiner
- 2003: Marlux–Wincor Nixdorf
- 2004: Oktos–Saint-Quentin
- 2005–2006: Agritubel–Loudun

Saulius Ruškys (born 18 April 1974) is a Lithuanian former cyclist.

== Major results ==
1995
1st Stage 6 Circuit Franco Belge
1998
1st Paris–Troyes
1st Sint-Gillis-Waas
3rd Grand Prix de Beuvry-la-Forêt
1999
1st Road race, National Road Championships
1st Stage 1 Tour de la Somme
1st Lincoln International GP
2nd Overall Tour de Normandie
2nd Grand Prix de Beuvry-la-Forêt
2001
1st Stage 3 Regio-Tour
1st Stage 1 Paris–Corrèze
1st Stage 5 Herald Sun Tour
2002
1st Stage 2 Three Days of De Panne
2003
1st Stage 3 Niedersachsen-Rundfahrt
2004
1st Stage 1 Tour de la Manche
1st Stage 1 Tour du Limousin
2nd GP de la Ville de Rennes
2005
1st Stage 5 Circuit de Lorraine
