= Vytautas Kaupas =

Lithuanian cyclist (born 1982)

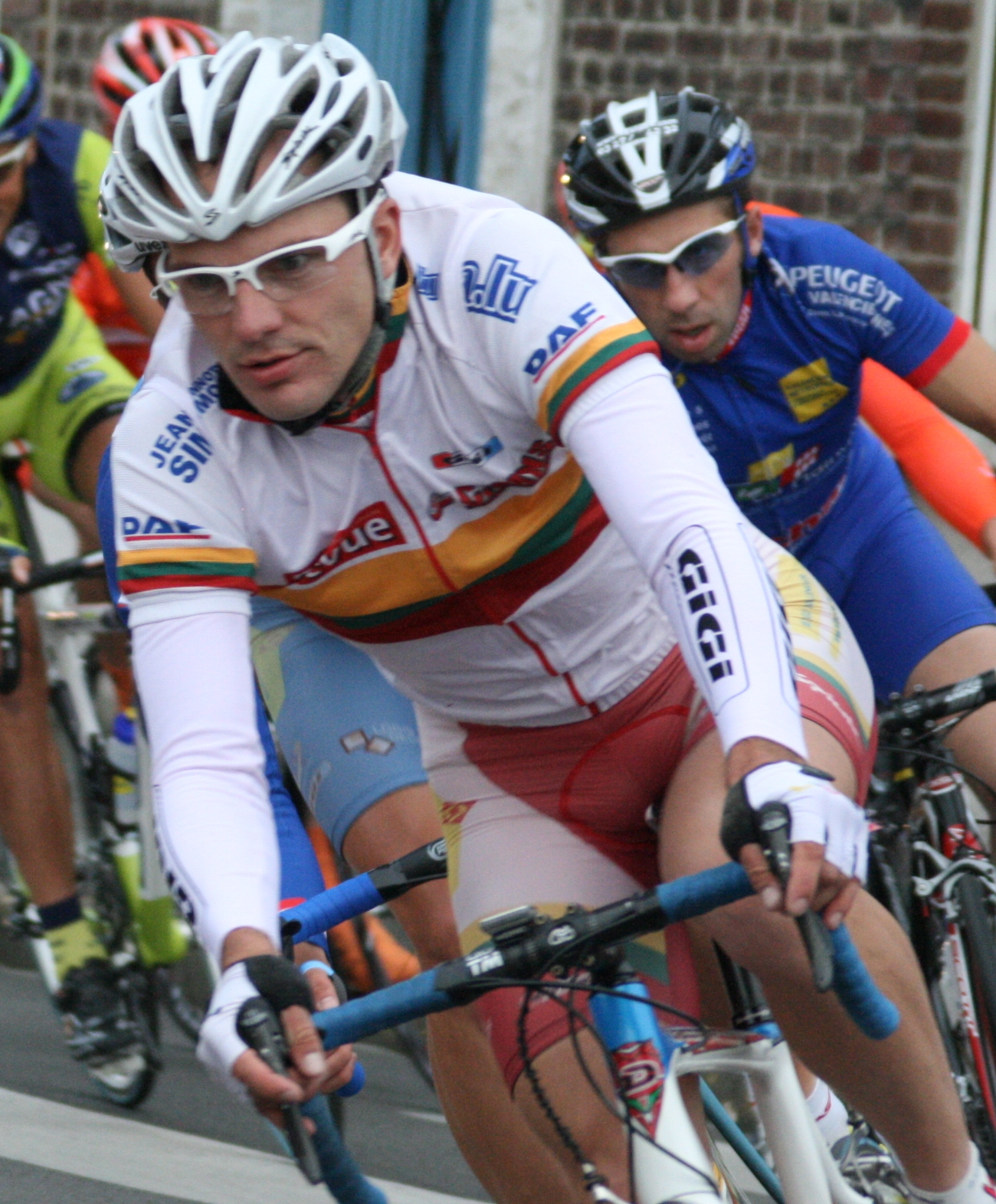

Personal information
- Born: 1 April 1982 (age 44) Vilnius, Lithuania

Cycling career
- Sport: Cycling
- Discipline: Road
- Role: Rider

Professional teams
- 2005–2008: Jartazi Granville Team
- 2009: Revor–Jartazi
- 2010–2014: Continental Team Differdange

Vytautas Kaupas (born 1 April 1982 in Vilnius) is a Lithuanian former professional racing cyclist.

== Major results ==
2003
1st National Road Race Championships
2004
1st Stage 6 Tour of Bulgaria
2nd National Time Trial Championships
2005
3rd Grand Prix de la Ville de Lillers
3rd National Road Race Championships
3rd Belsele-Puivelde
2006
1st Antwerpse Havenpijl
2007
1st Grand Prix de Beuvry-la-Forêt
2010
1st National Road Race Championships
1st Grand Prix de la ville de Nogent-sur-Oise
