= Edita Janeliūnaitė =

Lithuanian cyclist (born 1988)

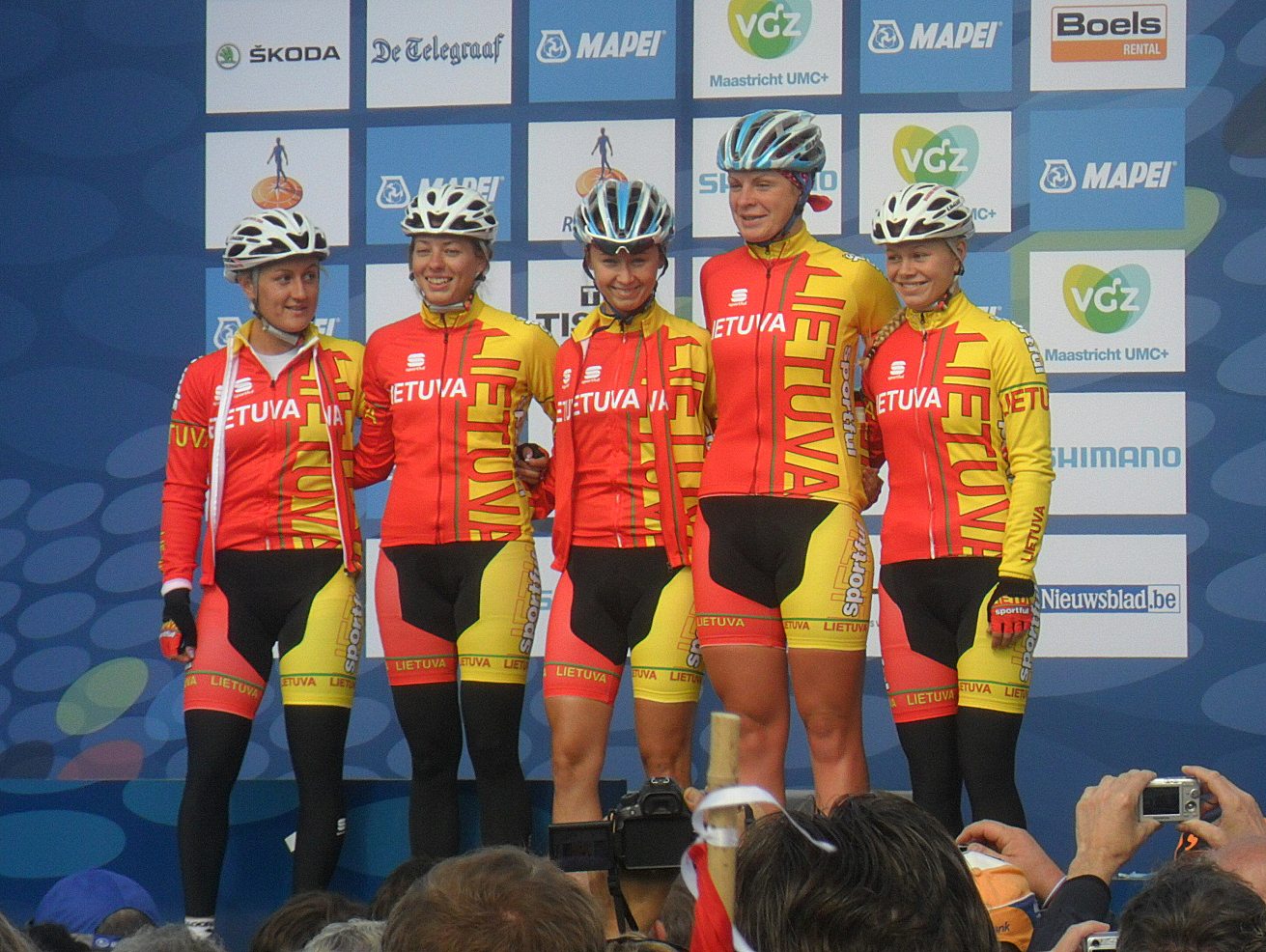
- Edita Janeliūnaitė at the 2012 UCI Road World Championships

Personal information
- Born: 16 December 1988 (age 37) Lithuania

Cycling career
- Sport: Cycling
- Discipline: Road cycling

Professional team
- 2014: Forno d'Asolo–Astute

Edita Janeliūnaitė (born 16 December 1988) is a road cyclist from Lithuania. She participated at the 2010 UCI Road World Championships, 2011 UCI Road World Championships and 2012 UCI Road World Championships.
