= Inga Češulienė =

Lithuanian cyclist (born 1986)

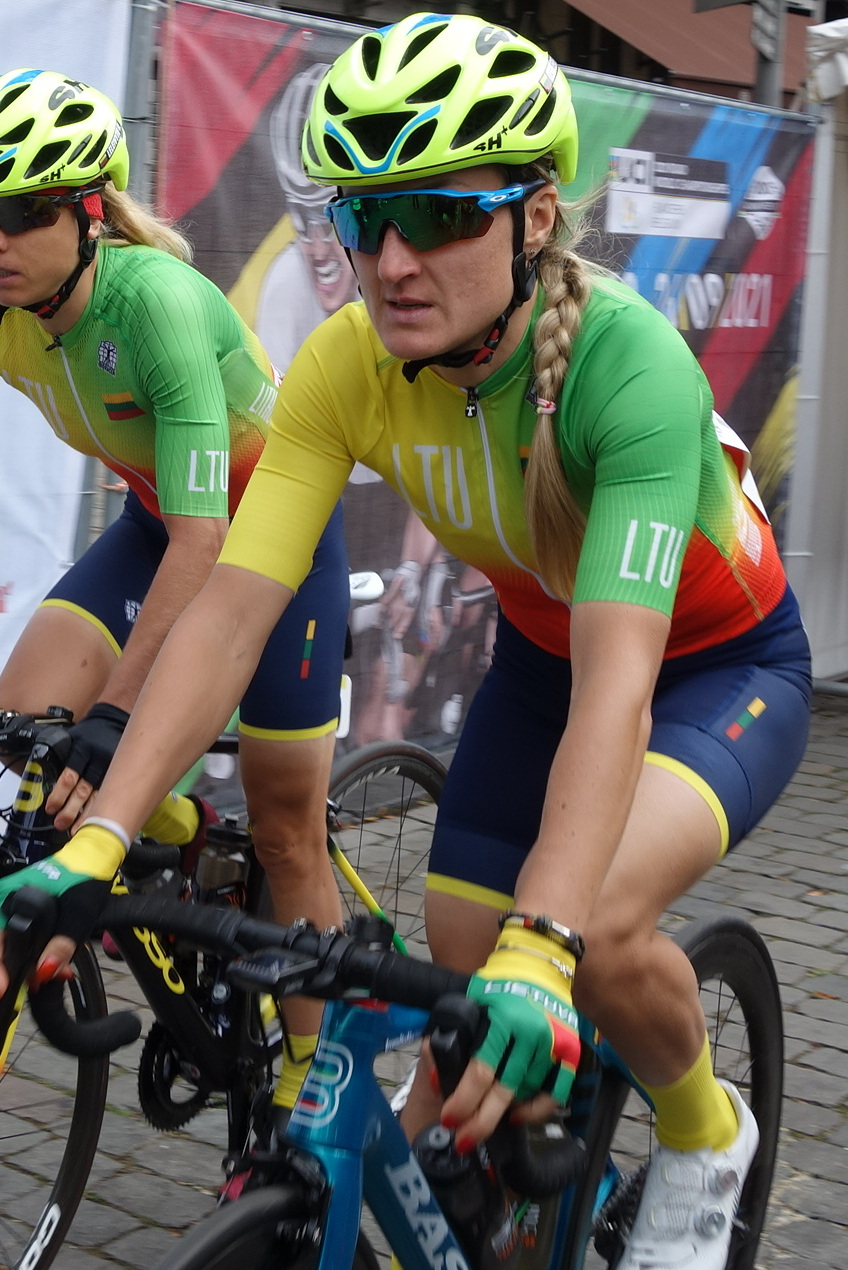
- Češulienė at the 2021 World Championships

Personal information
- Full name: Inga Češulienė
- Born: Inga Čilvinaitė; 14 February 1986 (age 40) Vilnius, Lithuania

Cycling career
- Sport: Cycling
- Current team: Aromitalia Vaiano
- Discipline: Road
- Role: Rider

Professional teams
- 2005: Team Bianchi–Aliverti
- 2007–2008: Ausra Gruodis
- 2009–2013: Safi–Pasta Zara–Titanedi
- 2014: RusVelo Women's Team
- 2021–: Aromitalia–Basso Bikes–Vaiano

Inga Češulienė (née Čilvinaitė; born 14 February 1986) is a Lithuanian racing cyclist, who currently rides for UCI Women's Continental Team Aromitalia Vaiano. In 2014, Češulienė was disqualified for a positive doping control for octopamine.

== Major results ==
2005
National Road Championships

1st Road Race
2nd Time Trial

2006
6th UEC European Cycling Championships, Road Race

2007
2nd Kontich
2nd Veurne-Bulskamp

2008
1st Massemen
2nd National Road Championships, Road Race

2009
1st Hoogstraten-Wortel

2010
1st Stage 2a Trophée d'Or Féminin

2011
2nd National Road Championships, Road Race

2012
1st National Road Championships, Road Race
1st Stage 3 Giro della Toscana Int. Femminile
2nd GP Liberazione

2013
1st National Road Championships, Time Trial
1st Overall Vuelta Internacional Femenina a Costa Rica

1st Stages 2 & 4

8th Overall Giro della Toscana Int. Femminile
9th Overall Vuelta Ciclista Femenina a el Salvador

2014
1st Stage 5 Vuelta Ciclista Femenina a el Salvador

2019
3rd National Road Championships, Road Race

2020
1st National Road Championships, Road Race
3rd National Road Championships, Time Trial

2021
1st National Road Championships, Road Race
1st National Road Championships, Time Trial
7th Overall Giro della Toscana Int. Femminile

2023
3rd National Road Championships, Road Race
1st National Road Championships, Time Trial
