= Oktos–Saint-Quentin =

Team information
- UCI code: OKT
- Registered: France
- Founded: 1999
- Disbanded: 2004
- Discipline: Road

Key personnel
- General manager: Pascal Cordier
- Team managers: Martial Gayant; Jean-François Bernard; Pascal Pfinder

Team name history
- 1999 2000–2002 2003 2004: Saint-Quentin–Oktos–MBK; Saint-Quentin–Oktos; MBK–Oktos–Saint-Quentin; Oktos–Saint-Quentin

Oktos–Saint-Quentin was a French professional road cycling team that existed from 1999 until 2004.

The team was founded in 1999 as Saint-Quentin–Oktos–MBK, and competed in the third division of professional teams. They had a fairly successful season, with well known riders including Saulius Ruškys and Eddy Seigneur, and upgraded to the second level the following year. The team faced two poor seasons, but were able to remain in the 2nd division. However, they downgraded back to the third for their final season in 2004, despite placing 12th in the ranking the previous season.

== UCI rankings ==
Year	Team classification	Highest ranked rider
1999	2nd (GSIII)	(Lithuania) Saulius Ruškys (208th)
2000	36th (GSII)	(Lithuania) Saulius Ruškys (236th)
2001	39th (GSII)	(Lithuania) Arturas Trumpauskas (749th)
2002	14th (GSII)	(Switzerland) Pierre Bourquenoud (235th)
2003	12th (GSII)	(United Kingdom) Jeremy Hunt (222nd)
2004	4th (GSIII)	(Kazakhstan) Andrey Mizurov (250th)
