= Edita Kubelskienė =

Lithuanian cyclist (born 1974)

Personal information
- Born: 1 March 1974 (age 52) Lithuania

Cycling career
- Sport: Cycling
- Disciplines: Road cycling, Track cycling

Professional teams
- 2000: La Rosa dei Venti
- 2001-2002: Figurella

Edita Kubelskienė (born 1 March 1974) is a former track and road cyclist from Lithuania. She represented her nation on the track at 2002, 2003 and 2004 and on the road at the 2004 UCI Road World Championships.
