= Artūras Trumpauskas =

Lithuanian cyclist (born 1972)

Personal information
- Full name: Artūras Trumpauskas
- Born: 1 May 1972 (age 54): Kaunas, Lithuanian SSR, Soviet Union; (now Lithuania)

Cycling career
- Sport: Cycling
- Current team: Retired
- Disciplines: Road; Track
- Role: Rider

Amateur team
- 1999: VC Rouen 76

Professional teams
- 2000: Boavista
- 2001: Saint-Quentin–Oktos

Artūras Trumpauskas (born 1 May 1972) is a Lithuanian former professional road and track cyclist. Professional in 2000 and 2001, he represented Lithuania at the 1996 Summer Olympics in the team pursuit event. He also competed at the 2001 UCI Road World Championships.

== Major results ==
1993
1st Stage 2 (TTT) Tour de Pologne
1997
3rd Time trial, National Road Championships
1999
1st Grand Prix de la Ville de Nogent-sur-Oise
