= Ignatas Konovalovas =

Lithuanian road bicycle racer

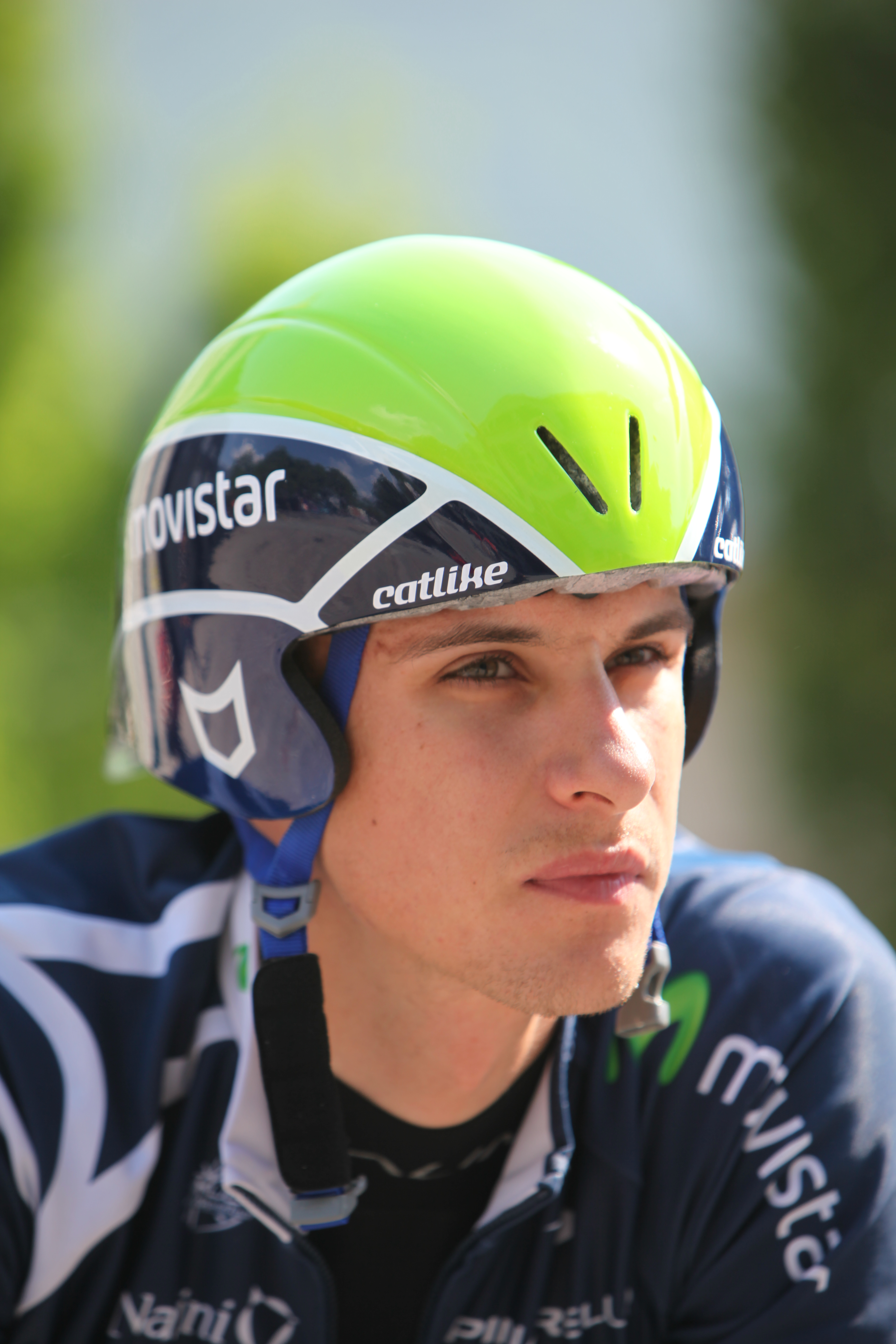
- Konovalovas at the 2011 Tour de Romandie

Personal information
- Full name: Ignatas Konovalovas
- Born: 8 December 1985 (age 40) Panevėžys, Lithuanian SSR (now Lithuania)
- Height: 190 cm (6 ft 3 in)
- Weight: 74 kg (163 lb)

Cycling career
- Sport: Cycling
- Current team: Retired
- Disciplines: Road; Track
- Role: Rider
- Rider type: Rouleur

Amateur teams
- 2006–2007: Vélo-Club La Pomme Marseille
- 2007: Crédit Agricole (stagiaire)

Professional teams
- 2008: Crédit Agricole
- 2009–2010: Cervélo TestTeam
- 2011–2012: Movistar Team
- 2013–2014: MTN–Qhubeka
- 2015: Team Marseille 13 KTM
- 2016–2024: FDJ

Major wins
- Grand Tours Giro d'Italia 1 individual stage (2009) Stage races Four Days of Dunkirk (2015) One-day races and Classics National Time Trial Championships (2006, 2008–2010, 2013, 2016–2017) National Road Race Championships (2017, 2021)

Ignatas Konovalovas (born 8 December 1985) is a Lithuanian former road bicycle racer, who competed as a professional from 2008 to 2024. Konovalovas has won the Lithuanian National Time Trial Championships seven times, in 2006, 2008, 2009, 2010, 2013, 2016, and 2017.

== Early life ==
Konovalovas was born in Panevėžys, the son of Laima Zilporytė, an Olympian cyclist, and Valerijus Konovalovas, a cycling coach. He has a sister, Irma, who is eight years younger.

== Professional career ==
Konovalovas finished third in the European Junior Team Pursuit Championships in 2003, third in the European Under-23 Team Pursuit Championships in 2007, and second in the European Under-23 Road Race Championships in 2007. In 2009, Konovalovas won the final time trial of the Giro d'Italia.

Konovalovas left the Movistar Team at the end of the 2012 season and joined the MTN–Qhubeka squad for the 2013 season. After spending 2015 riding for Team Marseille 13 KTM in August 2015 it was announced that Konovalovas would rejoin the UCI World Tour ranks by joining FDJ in 2016.

In June 2021, Konovalovas was forced to abandon the 2021 Tour de France, after being involved in a crash on the opening stage and being knocked unconscious.

== Major results ==
2003
3rd Team pursuit, UEC European Junior Track Championships
2005
3rd Time trial, National Road Championships
2006
National Road Championships

1st Time trial
2nd Road race

1st Overall Ronde de l'Isard

1st Points classification
1st Stage 1

2nd Les Boucles du Sud-Ardèche
3rd Team pursuit, UEC European Under-23 Track Championships
2007
UEC European Under-23 Road Championships

2nd Road race
4th Time trial

National Road Championships

2nd Road race
2nd Time trial

5th Overall Ronde de l'Isard

1st Stage 3

2008
1st Time trial, National Road Championships
4th Overall Tour de Luxembourg

1st Stage 2

2009
1st Time trial, National Road Championships
1st Giro del Mendrisiotto
1st Stage 21 (ITT) Giro d'Italia
7th Overall Danmark Rundt
8th Time trial, UCI Road World Championships
2010
1st Time trial, National Road Championships
9th Overall Tour du Poitou-Charentes
2012
2nd Time trial, National Road Championships
2013
National Road Championships

1st Time trial
2nd Road race

2014
National Road Championships

2nd Time trial
3rd Road race

2015
1st Overall Four Days of Dunkirk
1st Mountains classification Tour du Haut Var
2nd Velothon Wales
3rd Time trial, National Road Championships
3rd Overall Circuit des Ardennes

1st Stage 3 (TTT)

5th Classic Sud-Ardèche
5th Cholet-Pays de Loire
10th Tour du Finistère
2016
1st Time trial, National Road Championships
1st Stage 1 (TTT) La Méditerranéenne
2017
National Road Championships

1st Road race
1st Time trial

4th Overall Four Days of Dunkirk

1st Stage 5

2018
2nd Tour du Doubs
2021
1st Road race, National Road Championships
2022
3rd Road race, National Road Championships

=== Grand Tour general classification results timeline ===
Grand Tour	2009	2010	2011	2012	2013	2014	2015	2016	2017	2018	2019	2020	2021	2022	2023
Giro d'Italia	90	106	102	—	—	—	—	134	—	—	DNF	124	—	115	105
Tour de France	—	127	—	—	—	—	—	—	DNF	—	—	—	DNF	—	
/ Vuelta a España	DNF	—	DNF	—	—	—	—	—	—	—	—	—	—	—	

Legend
—	Did not compete
DNF	Did not finish
