= Trophée d'Or Féminin =

Women's European bicycle race

Race details
- Region: France
- Discipline: Road
- Type: Stage race
- Web site: www.trophee-d-or.fr

History
- First edition: 1994
- Editions: 23
- Final edition: 2015
- First winner: Lucia Zberg (SUI)
- Most wins: Jolanta Polikevičiūtė (LTU); Edita Pučinskaitė (LTU); Emma Johansson (SWE) (2 wins)
- Final winner: Élise Delzenne (FRA)

Trophée d'Or Féminin was a women's European bicycle race held in France. The race was discontinued in 2016.

== Overall winners ==
Year	Winner	Second	Third
1994	(Switzerland) Lucia Zberg		
1995	Elena Koliasseva		
1996	(Lithuania) Jolanta Polikevičiūtė		
1997	(France) Jeannie Longo-Ciprelli		
1998	(Lithuania) Jolanta Polikevičiūtė		
1999	(Australia) Tracey Gaudry		
2000	(Netherlands) Leontien Zijlaard-van Moorsel		
2001	(Lithuania) Edita Pučinskaitė		
2002	(Ukraine) Tatiana Stiajkina		
2003	(Australia) Olivia Gollan	(Germany) Hanka Kupfernagel	(Australia) Oenone Wood
2004	(Lithuania) Edita Pučinskaitė	(Australia) Alison Wright	(Russia) Valentina Polkhanova
2005	(Spain) Joane Somarriba	(France) Edwige Pitel	(Lithuania) Edita Pučinskaitė
2006	(Russia) Zoulfia Zabirova	(Ukraine) Tatiana Stiajkina	(Italy) Monia Baccaille
2007	(Italy) Noemi Cantele	(Switzerland) Nicole Brändli	(Italy) Giorgia Bronzini
2008	(Sweden) Emma Johansson	(Italy) Noemi Cantele	(France) Edwige Pitel
2009	(Lithuania) Diana Žiliūtė	(Lithuania) Edita Pučinskaitė	(Sweden) Emma Johansson
2010	(Sweden) Emma Johansson	(Lithuania) Edita Pučinskaitė	(Italy) Eleonora Patuzzo
2011	(Russia) Tatiana Antoshina	(Germany) Charlotte Becker	(Netherlands) Annemiek van Vleuten
2012	(Italy) Elena Cecchini	(Netherlands) Anna van der Breggen	(Italy) Marta Tagliaferro
2013	(Netherlands) Marianne Vos	(Netherlands) Anna van der Breggen	(Netherlands) Lucinda Brand
2014	(Italy) Elisa Longo Borghini	(Italy) Elena Berlato	(Belgium) Ann-Sophie Duyck
2015	(Australia) Rachel Neylan	(France) Edwige Pitel	(Australia) Carlee Taylor

== Jerseys ==
As of the 2016 edition:

is worn by the overall leader of the race
is worn by the leader of the mountain classification
is worn by the leader of the points classification
is worn by the leader of the young rider classification
