= Edita Pučinskaitė =

Lithuanian cyclist (born 1975)

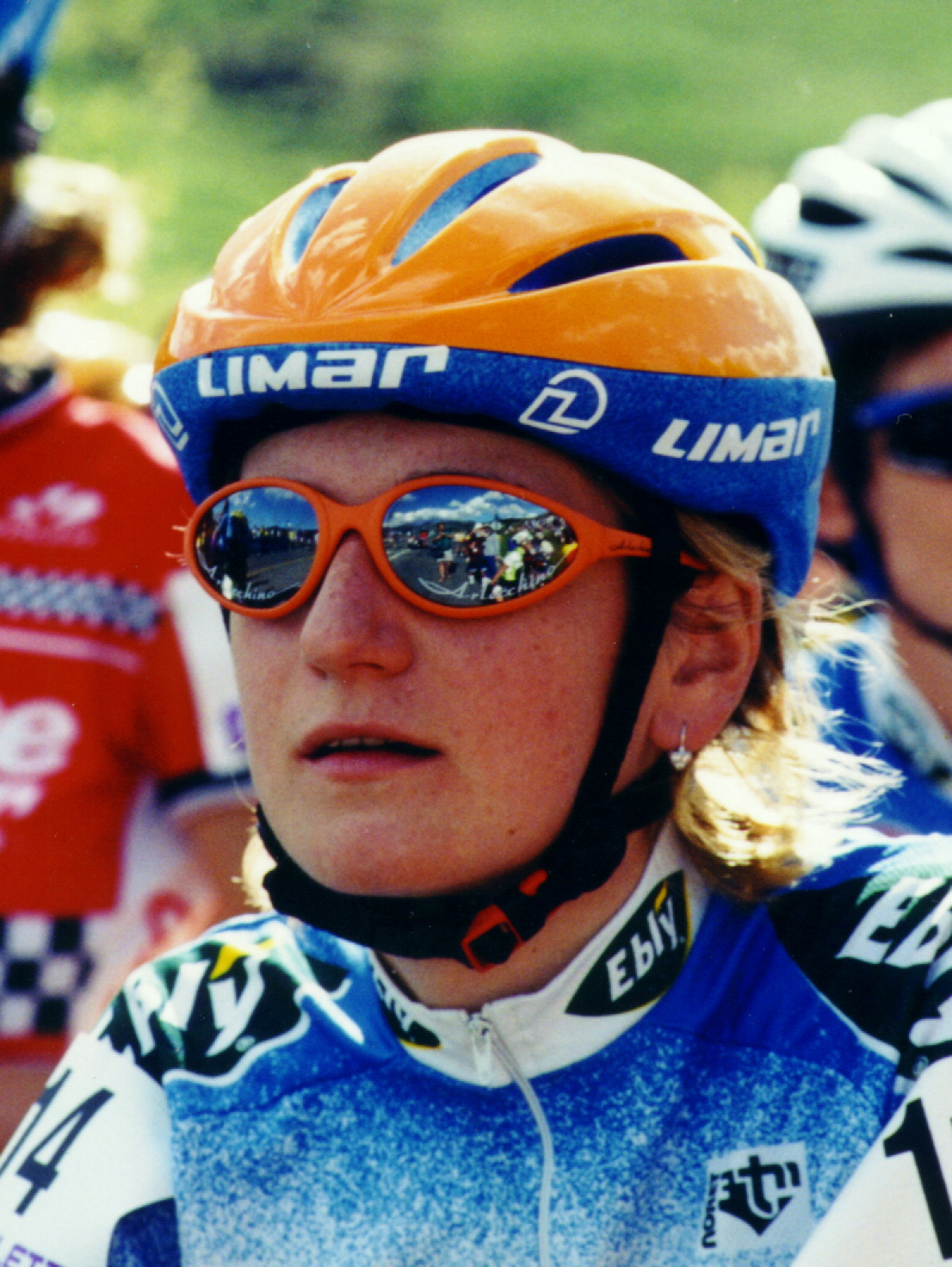
- Pučinskaitė awaiting the start of the Elkhorn Resort Circuit Race (stage 5 of the 1999 Women's Challenge stage race).

Personal information
- Full name: Edita Pučinskaitė
- Born: November 25, 1975 (age 50) Naujoji Akmenė, Lithuanian SSR, Soviet Union

Cycling career
- Sport: Cycling
- Discipline: Road
- Role: Rider

Professional teams
- 1999: Acca Due O
- 2000–2001: Alfa Lum
- 2002: Figurella
- 2003–2004: SC Michela Fanini Record Box
- 2005–2006: Nobili Rubinetterie-Menikini Cogeas
- 2007–2008: Equipe Nürnberger Versicherung
- 2009: Cmax Dilà
- 2010: Gauss Rdz Ormu
Medal record
Representing Lithuania
Women's road cycling
World Championships
Gold medal – first place	1999	Road race
Silver medal – second place	2001	Road race
Bronze medal – third place	1995	Road race
Bronze medal – third place	1999	Time trial

Edita Pučinskaitė (born November 27, 1975, in Naujoji Akmenė) is a Lithuanian racing cyclist. For many years, she was one of the top competitors in women's road racing with a victory in the World Road Race Championships in 1999 and several high finishes in major tours, world championships and the UCI points listings.

== Major results ==
1994
1st Overall Étoile Vosgienne

1st Stage 1

2nd Anneville-sur-Scie Road Race
1995
3rd Road Race, UCI Road World Championships
1996
2nd Vertemate con Minoprio
8th Road Race, UCI Road World Championships
9th Trofeo Alfredo Binda
1997
1st Liberty Classic
3rd Overall Giro d'Italia Femminile
4th Vertemate con Minoprio
1998
National Road Championships

1st Road Race
1st Time Trial

1st Overall Grande Boucle Féminine Internationale

1st Stages 1, 3 & 4

1st Overall Thüringen-Rundfahrt der Frauen
1999
1st UCI Road World Championships Road Race
1st Time Trial, National Road Championships
1st Overall Giro della Toscana Int. Femminile
2nd La Flèche Wallonne
3rd UCI Road World Championships – Women's time trial
3rd Overall Grande Boucle Féminine Internationale
8th Trofeo Alfredo Binda
2000
1st Trophée des Grimpeurs
1st Stage 8 Giro d'Italia Femminile
2nd Overall Grande Boucle Féminine Internationale

1st Stages 8 & 10

10th Time Trial, Olympic Games
2001
1st Overall Trophée d'Or Féminin
1st Stage 3 Tour de l'Aude Cycliste Féminin
2nd Road Race, UCI Road World Championships
3rd Overall Giro d'Italia Femminile
3rd GP Suisse Féminin
4th La Flèche Wallonne
2002
1st Time Trial, National Road Championships
1st Overall Emakumeen Euskal Bira
3rd Overall Tour de l'Aude Cycliste Féminin

1st Stage 8

6th La Flèche Wallonne
2003
National Road Championships

1st Time Trial
2nd Road Race

1st Overall Tour Cycliste Féminin Ardèche Sud Rhone Alpes
2nd Overall Giro d'Italia Femminile
3rd Amstel Gold Race
3rd Emakumeen Saria
3rd Trofeo Riviera Della Versilia
4th Road Race, UCI Road World Championships
4th La Flèche Wallonne
10th UCI Road World Championships – Women's time trial
2004
1st Overall Trophée d'Or Féminin

1st Stage 4

1st GP Ouest France
1st Stage 2 Giro d'Italia Femminile
3rd Overall Giro della Toscana Int. Femminile

1st Stage 2

3rd Road Race, National Road Championships
3rd Emakumeen Saria
3rd La Flèche Wallonne
3rd Trofeo Citta' di Rosignano
5th UCI Road World Championships – Women's time trial
6th Trofeo Alfredo Binda
Olympic Games

9th Road Race
10th Time Trial

10th Road Race, UCI Road World Championships
2005
1st Overall Tour Cycliste Féminin Ardèche Sud Rhone Alpes

1st Stage 1a

1st Overall Vuelta Ciclista Femenina a el Salvador

1st Prologue, Stages 1 & 2

1st Berner Rundfahrt
1st Stage 4 Giro del Trentino Alto Adige-Südtirol
1st Stage 6 Thüringen-Rundfahrt der Frauen
2nd GP Ouest France
3rd Overall Giro d'Italia Femminile
3rd Overall Trophée d'Or Féminin
10th Trofeo Alfredo Binda
10th La Flèche Wallonne
10th UCI Road World Championships – Women's time trial
2006
National Road Championships

1st Time Trial
2nd Road Race

1st Overall Giro d'Italia Femminile

1st Stage 10

1st Overall Tour Cycliste Féminin Ardèche Sud Rhone Alpes
3rd Overall Giro del Trentino Alto Adige-Südtirol
3rd Overall Giro di San Marino
6th La Flèche Wallonne
2007
National Road Championships

1st Time Trial
3rd Road Race

1st Overall Giro d'Italia Femminile

1st Prologue & Stage 3

1st Overall Giro del Trentino Alto Adige-Südtirol

1st Stages 1 & 2

1st Emakumeen Saria
1st Berner Rundfahrt
2nd Overall Giro di San Marino
2008
3rd Open de Suède Vårgårda
9th Road Race, Olympic Games
2009
2nd Overall Trophée d'Or Féminin
3rd Giornata Rosa di Nove
10th Giro d'Italia Femminile

1st Stage 1

10th Giro della Toscana Int. Femminile
2010
2nd Overall Thüringen-Rundfahrt der Frauen

1st Stage 2

2nd Overall Trophée d'Or Féminin
8th Overall Giro della Toscana Int. Femminile

Awards
Preceded by (Lithuania) Diana Žiliūtė	Best Lithuanian Sportsperson of the Year; 1999	Succeeded by (Lithuania) Virgilijus Alekna
