= Katažina Sosna =

Lithuanian cyclist (born 1990)

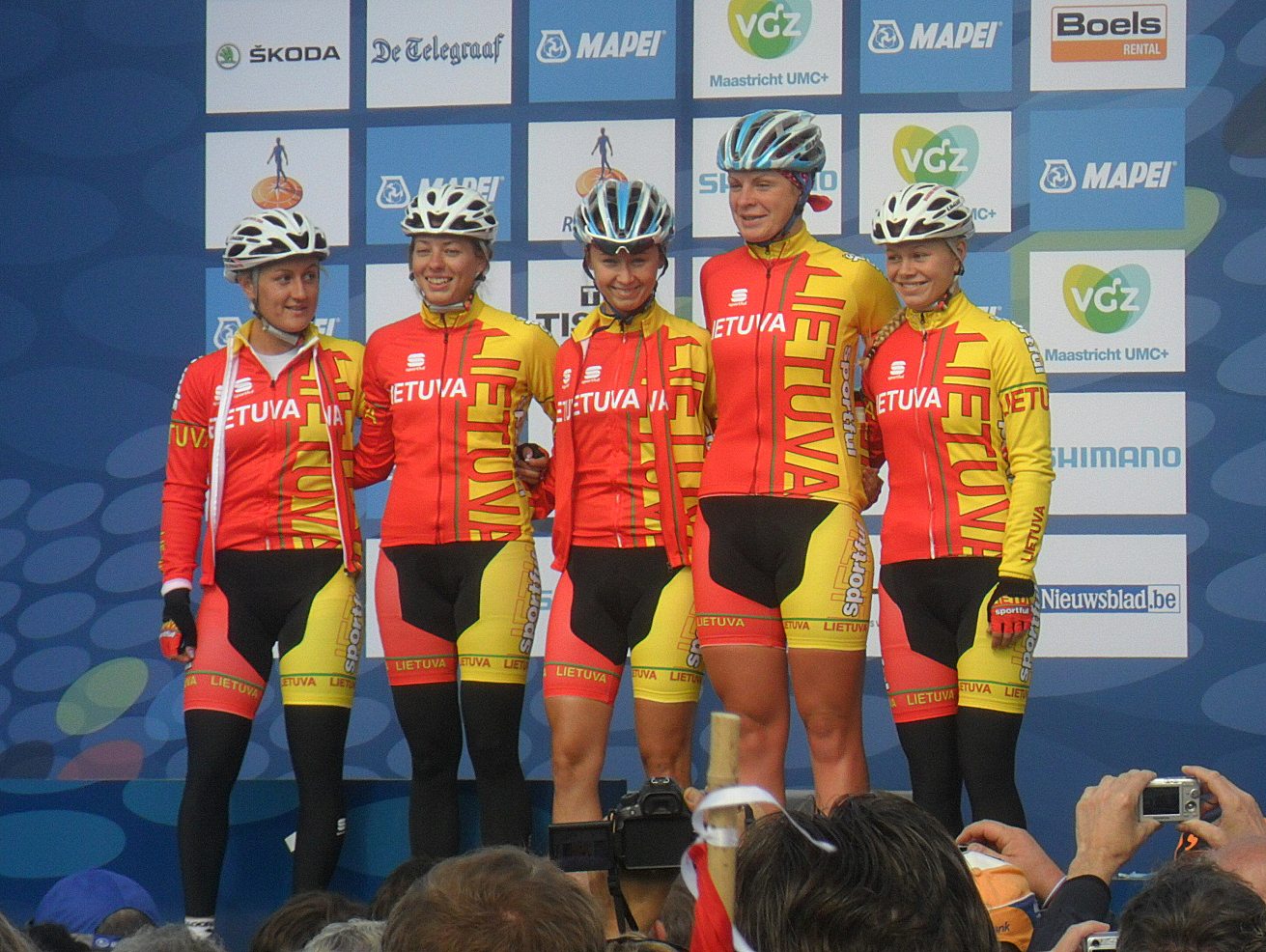
- Kataržina Sosna at the 2012 UCI Road World Championships

Personal information
- Born: 30 November 1990 (age 35) Vilnius, Lithuania

Cycling career
- Sport: Cycling
- Role: Rider

Professional team
- 2010–2014: Vaiano Solaristech

Major wins
- One day races & Classics National Time trial Championships (2010, 2019–2020)
Medal record
Representing Lithuania
Women's mountain bike racing
European Championships
Bronze medal – third place	2016 Sigulda	Marathon

Katažina Sosna–Pinelė (born 30 November 1990) is a Lithuanian racing cyclist. She competed in the 2012 UCI Road World Championships in Valkenburg aan de Geul and in the 2013 UCI women's time trial in Florence.

== Major results ==
=== Road ===
2008
1st Overall Omloop van Borsele Juniors

1st Stage 4

2010
1st Time Trial, National Road Championships
1st GP Vallaton
1st Cham-Hagendorn
3rd Time Trial, UEC U23 European Road Championship
7th Sparkassen Giro

2011
2nd Time Trial, National Road Championships
3rd Time Trial, UEC U23 European Road Championship

2012
National Road Championships

2nd Time Trial
3rd Road Race

9th Time Trial, UEC U23 European Road Championship
10th Heydar Aliyev Anniversary Time Trial

2013
2nd Time Trial, National Road Championships

2014
3rd Time Trial, National Road Championships

2019
National Road Championships

1st Time Trial
2nd Road Race

2020
National Road Championships

1st Time Trial
2nd Road Race

== Mountainbike ==
2015
2nd Iseo Mountainbike

2016
1st Iseo Mountainbike
1st Calonge Marathon
3rd Marathon, UEC U23 European Mountainbike Championship

2017
1st Marathon, National Mountainbike Championships
