= Remigijus Lupeikis =

Lithuanian cyclist

Personal information
- Full name: Remigijus Lupeikis
- Born: September 22, 1968 (age 58): Klaipėda, Lithuanian SSR, Soviet Union; (now Lithuania)
- Height: 1.88 m (6 ft 2 in)
- Weight: 80 kg (176 lb)

Cycling career
- Sport: Cycling
- Current team: Retired
- Disciplines: Road; Track
- Role: Rider

Professional teams
- 1992: Postobón–Manzana–Ryalcao
- 1995: Recer–Boavista
- 1996–1997: U.S. Postal Service
- 2000–2002: Mróz–Supradyn Witaminy
Medal record
Representing Lithuania
Men's track cycling
World Championships
Silver medal – second place	Bogotá 1995	Points Race

Remigijus Lupeikis (born 22 September 1968) is a Lithuanian former track and road racing cyclist. Initially competing for the Soviet Union prior to its breakup, he had a long career riding for Lithuania, which included competing in both road and track events at the 1996 Summer Olympics, and in the road race at the 2000 Summer Olympics.

Born in Klaipėda, Lupeikis was never selected to race in the Tour de France, but he did compete at the Vuelta a España in 1992 and 1997 as well as the Giro d'Italia in 1992. He won the Tour de Berlin in 1994. In 1995 he won a silver medal in the Men's points race at the 1995 UCI Track Cycling World Championships in Colombia. He won Lithuanian Sportsman of the Year that same year. He won the Tour d'Egypte in 2000. Also in 2000, he was Lithuanian champion in the individual time trial. He retired from cycling in 2002, after becoming Lithuanian champion in the road race.

== Major results ==
1991
1st Stage 1 Clásico RCN
1st Stage 4 Vuelta a Colombia
1992
Tour du Poitou-Charentes

1st Stages 4 & 5

10th Overall Vuelta a Murcia
1993
Tour de Pologne

1st Prologue & Stages 1, 2 & 8

2nd Overall Mi-Août en Bretagne
1994
1st Tour de Berlin
2nd Overall Ronde van Midden-Nederland
3rd Overall Teleflex Tour

1st Stage 4

1995
1st Stage 2 Volta ao Algarve
2000
1st Overall Tour d'Egypte

1st Stages 2 & 7

2nd Road race, National Road Championships
2nd Overall Course de la Solidarité Olympique

1st Stage 4

2001
1st Stage 7 Tour of Slovenia
3rd Overall Szlakiem Grodów Piastowskich
3rd Overall Herald Sun Tour

1st Stage 12 (TTT)

2002
National Road Championships

1st Road race
2nd Time trial

1st Stage 8 Peace Race
1st Stage 4 Tour de Pologne
2nd Overall Szlakiem Grodów Piastowskich
6th GP Herning

=== Grand Tour general classification results timeline ===
Grand Tour	1992	1993	1994	1995	1996	1997
Giro d'Italia	93	—	—	—	—	—
Tour de France	Did not contest during his career					
Vuelta a España	DNF	—	—	—	—	124

Legend
—	Did not compete
DNF	Did not finish

Awards
Preceded by (Lithuania) Raimundas Mažuolis	Lithuanian Sportsperson of the Year; 1995	Succeeded by (Lithuania) Arvydas Sabonis
