= UCI Junior World Championships =

The UCI Juniors World Championships were a set of UCI World Championships events for junior cyclists in 2005 to 2009. In 2010 it was divided into:

- The Junior men's road race at the UCI Road World Championships
- The UCI Junior Track Cycling World Championships

== Championships ==
Year	Country	Location
2005	Austria	Vienna
2006	Belgium	Ghent
2007	Mexico	Aguascalientes
2008	South Africa	Cape Town
2009	Russia	Moscow

== See also ==
- UCI Junior Track Cycling World Championships
