= Dainius Kairelis =

Lithuanian cyclist (born 1979)

Personal information
- Full name: Dainius Kairelis
- Born: 25 September 1979 (age 47) Utena, Lithuanian SSR

Cycling career
- Sport: Cycling
- Discipline: Road
- Role: Rider

Professional teams
- 2005: Amore & Vita-Beretta-Polska
- 2006–2007: Amore & Vita-McDonald's
- 2008–2009: Ceramica Flaminia

Dainius Kairelis (born 25 September 1979 in Utena) is a former Lithuanian professional road bicycle racer.

In 2003 he won Giro Ciclistico d'Italia stage race. in 2006 he became Lithuanian champion in road race. In 2007 he finished first in Giro d'Oro.

== Major results ==
2003
1st, Baby Giro
2005
1st, Stage 2, Herald Sun Tour
2006
(Lithuania) National Road Race Championship
2007
1st, Giro d'Oro
