= Jolanta Polikevičiūtė =

Lithuanian cyclist (born 1970)

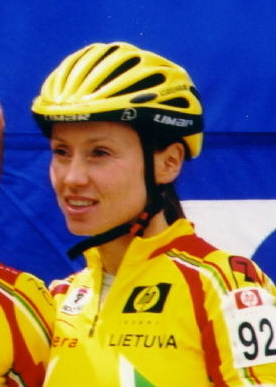
- Jolanta Polikeviciute on 2002 Women's Challenge bicycle race

Personal information
- Full name: Jolanta Polikevičiūtė
- Born: 25 September 1970 (age 56) Panevėžys, Lithuanian SSR, Soviet Union
- Height: 1.65 m (5 ft 5 in)
- Weight: 50 kg (110 lb)

Cycling career
- Sport: Cycling
- Current team: Retired
Medal record
Representing Lithuania
Women's road cycling
World Championships
Silver medal – second place	1994 Agrigento	Team Time Trial

Jolanta Polikevičiūtė (born 25 September 1970 in Panevėžys) is a retired female road racing cyclist from Lithuania, who competed in three Summer Olympics for her native country: 1996, 2004 and 2008. She is the twin sister of Rasa Polikevičiūtė, who also had a professional career in women's cycling.

== Major results ==
1994
10th UCI Road World Championships – Women's time trial
