= Trofeo Alfredo Binda-Comune di Cittiglio =

Italian one-day road cycling race

- 2026 Trofeo Alfredo Binda-Comune di Cittiglio

Race details
- Date: March
- Region: Province of Varese, Italy
- English name: Trophy of Alfredo Binda-Municipality of Cittiglio
- Nickname: Trofeo Alfredo Binda
- Discipline: Road
- Competition: UCI Women's Road World Cup (2008–2015); UCI Women's World Tour (2016–)
- Type: One-day race
- Organiser: Cycling Sport Promotion
- Web site: www.trofeobinda.com

History
- First edition: 1974
- Editions: 50 (as of 2026)
- First winner: Giuseppina Micheloni (ITA)
- Most wins: Maria Canins (ITA); Marianne Vos (NED) (4 wins)
- Most recent: Karlijn Swinkels (NED)

Trofeo Alfredo Binda-Comune di Cittiglio is a one-day women's professional road bicycle racing event held annually in the comune (municipality) of Cittiglio and nearby comunes located within the Province of Varese in the region of Lombardy in northern Italy.

First held in 1974, Trofeo Alfredo Binda is one of the oldest and most established races in the women's calendar, and has been part of the UCI Women's World Tour since its inception in 2016.

== History ==
Trofeo Alfredo Binda was first held as a regional event in 1974. The race became a national event in 1999, before becoming an international event from 2007. In 2008, the race joined the UCI Women's Road World Cup. In 2016, the race became part of the new UCI Women's World Tour. From 2025, the race has moved backwards one week in the calendar, allowing Milan–San Remo Women to join the UCI Women's World Tour. In 2026, the race celebrated its 50th edition.

The race is one of the biggest races on the women's calendar that does not have a male equivalent. Media have suggested that the race may be worthy of cycling monument status, due to the race's history and longevity on the women's calendar.

The race is well suited for puncheurs and climbers, with two riders winning the race four times – Italian rider Maria Canins (1984, 1985, 1990, 1992), and Dutch rider Marianne Vos (2009, 2010, 2012, 2019). As of 2026, Italian riders have won the event on twenty eight occasions, most recently by three time winner Elisa Balsamo (2022, 2024, 2025).

The race is named after Italian cyclist Alfredo Binda, who was from Cittiglio. In the 1920s and 1930s, he won five editions of the Giro d'Italia, four editions of the Giro di Lombardia and two editions of Milan–San Remo – as well as being world champion three times. A junior race (Piccolo Trofeo Alfredo Binda) has been held alongside the race since 1979, with it becoming part of the UCI Nations Cup from 2015.

== Course ==
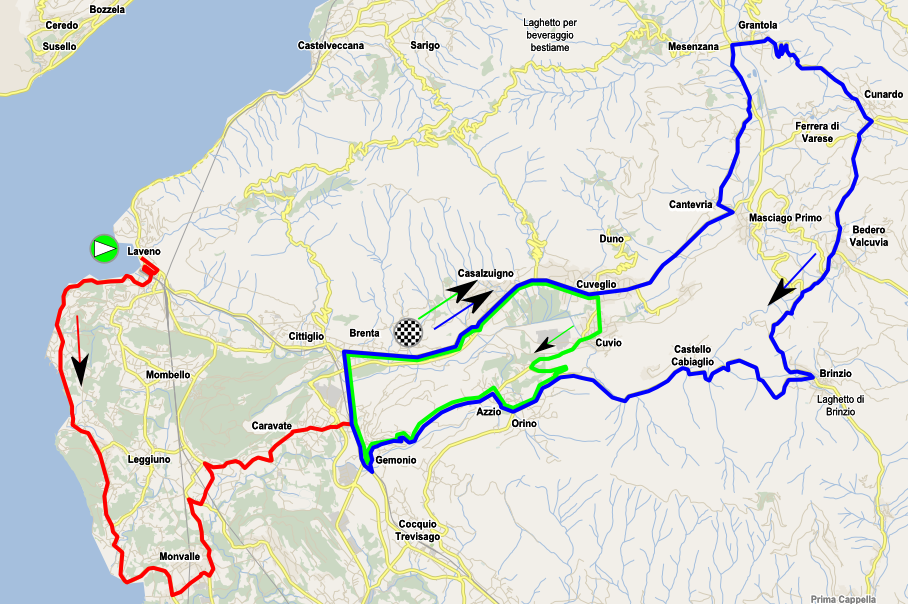
Course map of the 2015 edition

Trofeo Alfredo Binda is held in the Province of Varese in the region of Lombardy in northern Italy. The start location varies from year to year, but the course culminates with multiple laps of a hilly circuit outside Cittiglio around 15 kilometres (9.3 mi) in length. Recent editions of the race have been around 130 kilometres (81 mi) to 150 kilometres (93 mi) in length.

The circuit has two significant climbs – the Casale Alto or Casalzuigno (0.8km at 7%) in the early part of the circuit and the climb of Orino (2.6km at 5%), which typically separates the field as it is located just before the conclusion of the circuit. The circuit passes through Brenta, Casalzuigno, Casale Alto, Cuveglio, Cuvio, Azzio, Gemonio before returning to Cittiglio. The final kilometres of the lap are downhill, with a flat finish.

Other climbs that have featured on the route include the Masciago Primo (5.1km at 4.6%), Caldana (2.2km at 4.5%) and Cunardo (4km at 4.8%).

== Past winners ==
| Year | First | Second | Third |
|---|---|---|---|
| 1974 | (Italy) Giuseppina Micheloni | | |
| 1975 | (Belgium) Nicolle Van Den Broeck | | |
| 1976 | (Italy) Morena Tartagni | | |
| 1977 | (Italy) Nicoletta Castelli | | |
| 1978 | (Italy) Emanuela Menuzzo | | |
| 1979 | (Italy) Anna Morlacchi | | |
| 1980 | (Italy) Francesca Galli | | |
| 1981 | (Italy) Emanuela Menuzzo | | |
| 1982 | (Italy) Lucia Pizzolotto | | |
| 1983 | (Italy) Michela Tomasi | | |
| 1984 | (Italy) Maria Canins | | |
| 1985 | (Italy) Maria Canins | (Italy) Maria Mosole | (Italy) Cristina Menuzzo |
| 1986 | (Italy) Stefania Carmine | | |
| 1987 | (Italy) Rossella Galbiati | | |
| 1988 | (Italy) Elisabetta Fanton | | |
| 1989 | (Italy) Elisabetta Fanton | | |
| 1990 | (Italy) Maria Canins | | |
| 1991 | (Italy) Maria Paola Turcutto | | |
| 1992 | (Italy) Maria Canins | | |
| 1993 | (Italy) Roberta Ferrero | (Italy) Mara Calliope | (Italy) Lucia Pizzolotto |
| 1994 | (Italy) Fabiana Luperini | (Italy) Lucia Pizzolotto | (Italy) Katia Longhin |
| 1995 | (Italy) Valeria Cappellotto | (Italy) Alessandra Cappellotto | (Italy) Imelda Chiappa |
| 1996 | (Italy) Valeria Cappellotto | (Italy) Imelda Chiappa | (Lithuania) Diana Žiliūtė |
| 1997–98 | No race | | |
| 1999 | (France) Fany Lecourtois | (United States) Mari Holden-Paulsen | (Finland) Pia Sundstedt |
| 2000 | (Italy) Fabiana Luperini | (Finland) Pia Sundstedt | (France) Fany Lecourtois |
| 2001 | (Switzerland) Nicole Brändli | (Italy) Noemi Cantele | (Lithuania) Diana Žiliūtė |
| 2002 | (Russia) Svetlana Bubnenkova | (Germany) Regina Schleicher | (Belarus) Zinaida Stahurskaya |
| 2003 | (Lithuania) Diana Žiliūtė | (Ukraine) Valentina Karpenko | (Australia) Alison Wright |
| 2004 | (Australia) Oenone Wood | (Australia) Olivia Gollan | (Italy) Noemi Cantele |
| 2005 | (United Kingdom) Nicole Cooke | (Italy) Katia Longhin | (Japan) Miho Oki |
| 2006 | (Germany) Regina Schleicher | (Lithuania) Diana Žiliūtė | (Italy) Katia Longhin |
| 2007 | (United Kingdom) Nicole Cooke | (Italy) Giorgia Bronzini | (Italy) Martina Corazza |
| 2008 | (United Kingdom) Emma Pooley | (Netherlands) Suzanne de Goede | (Lithuania) Diana Žiliūtė |
| 2009 | (Netherlands) Marianne Vos | (Sweden) Emma Johansson | (United States) Kristin Armstrong |
| 2010 | (Netherlands) Marianne Vos | (Netherlands) Martine Bras | (Sweden) Emma Johansson |
| 2011 | (United Kingdom) Emma Pooley | (Sweden) Emma Johansson | (Netherlands) Annemiek van Vleuten |
| 2012 | (Netherlands) Marianne Vos | (Italy) Tatiana Guderzo | (Germany) Trixi Worrack |
| 2013 | (Italy) Elisa Longo Borghini | (Sweden) Emma Johansson | (Netherlands) Ellen van Dijk |
| 2014 | (Sweden) Emma Johansson | (United Kingdom) Lizzie Armitstead | (Belarus) Alena Amialiusik |
| 2015 | (United Kingdom) Lizzie Armitstead | (France) Pauline Ferrand-Prévot | (Netherlands) Anna van der Breggen |
| 2016 | (United Kingdom) Lizzie Armitstead | (United States) Megan Guarnier | (Switzerland) Jolanda Neff |
| 2017 | (United States) Coryn Rivera | (Cuba) Arlenis Sierra | (Denmark) Cecilie Uttrup Ludwig |
| 2018 | (Poland) Katarzyna Niewiadoma | (Netherlands) Chantal Blaak | (Netherlands) Marianne Vos |
| 2019 | (Netherlands) Marianne Vos | (Australia) Amanda Spratt | (Denmark) Cecilie Uttrup Ludwig |
| 2020 | Race cancelled due to COVID-19 pandemic | | |
| 2021 | (Italy) Elisa Longo Borghini | (Netherlands) Marianne Vos | (Denmark) Cecilie Uttrup Ludwig |
| 2022 | (Italy) Elisa Balsamo | (Italy) Sofia Bertizzolo | (Italy) Soraya Paladin |
| 2023 | (Netherlands) Shirin van Anrooij | (Italy) Elisa Balsamo | (Italy) Vittoria Guazzini |
| 2024 | (Italy) Elisa Balsamo | (Belgium) Lotte Kopecky | (Netherlands) Puck Pieterse |
| 2025 | (Italy) Elisa Balsamo | (Hungary) Blanka Vas | (United Kingdom) Cat Ferguson |
| 2026 | (Netherlands) Karlijn Swinkels | (Netherlands) Anna van der Breggen | (Norway) Mie Ottestad |

=== Multiple winners ===
| Wins | Rider | Editions |
|---|---|---|
| 4 | Maria Canins (ITA) | 1984, 1985, 1990, 1992 |
| 4 | Marianne Vos (NED) | 2009, 2010, 2012, 2019 |
| 3 | Elisa Balsamo (ITA) | 2022, 2024, 2025 |
| 2 | Emanuela Menuzzo (ITA) | 1978, 1981 |
| 2 | Elisabetta Fanton (ITA) | 1988, 1989 |
| 2 | Fabiana Luperini (ITA) | 1994, 2000 |
| 2 | Valeria Cappellotto (ITA) | 1995, 1996 |
| 2 | Nicole Cooke (UK) | 2005, 2007 |
| 2 | Emma Pooley (UK) | 2008, 2011 |
| 2 | Lizzie Deignan (UK) | 2015, 2016 |
| 2 | Elisa Longo Borghini (ITA) | 2013, 2021 |

=== Wins per country ===
| Wins | Country |
|---|---|
| 28 | Italy |
| 6 | United Kingdom |
| 6 | Netherlands |
| 1 | Australia; Belgium; France; Germany; Lithuania; Poland; Russia; Sweden; Switzerland; United States |
