= Italian National Road Race Championships =

National road cycling championship in Italy

The traditional Italian tricolor jersey

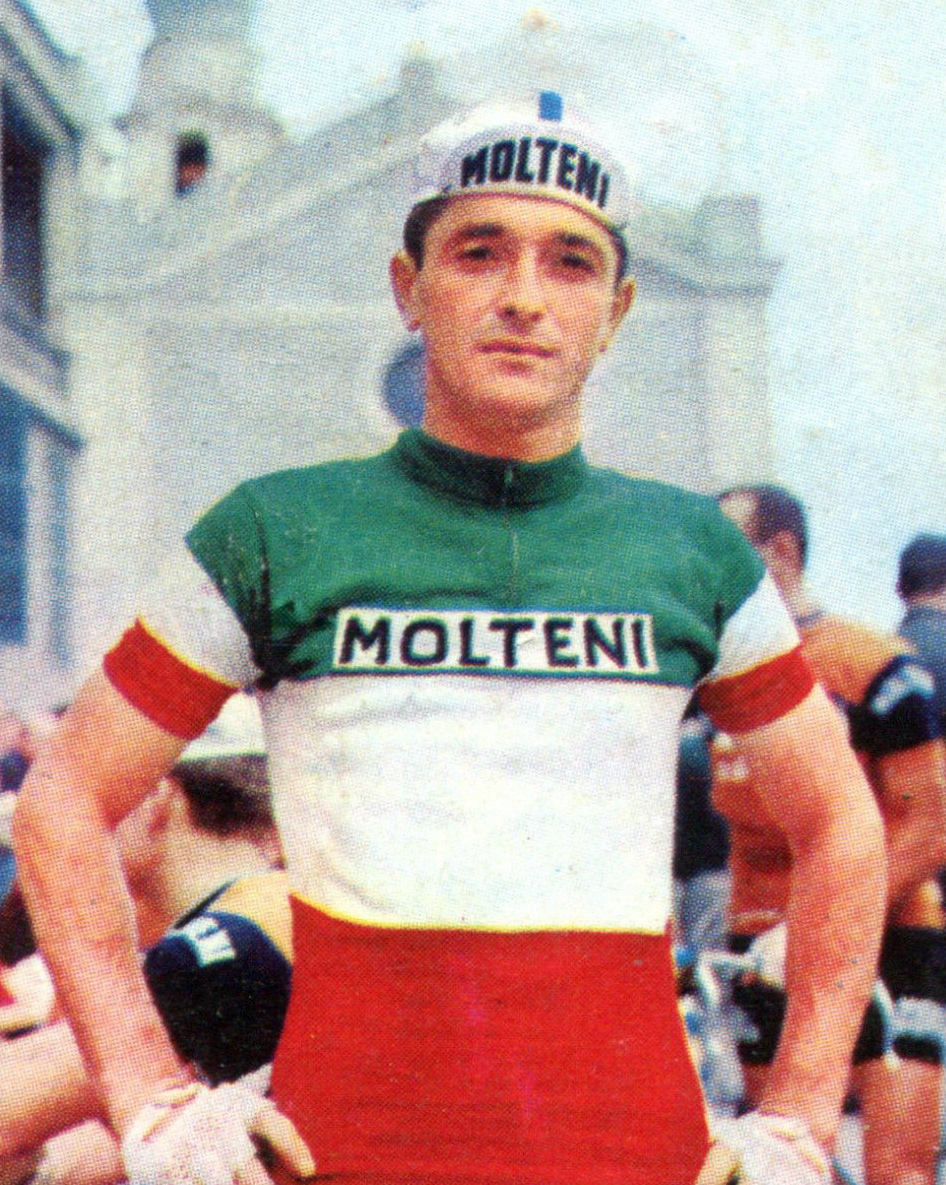
Michele Dancelli wears the original maglia tricolore in 1966

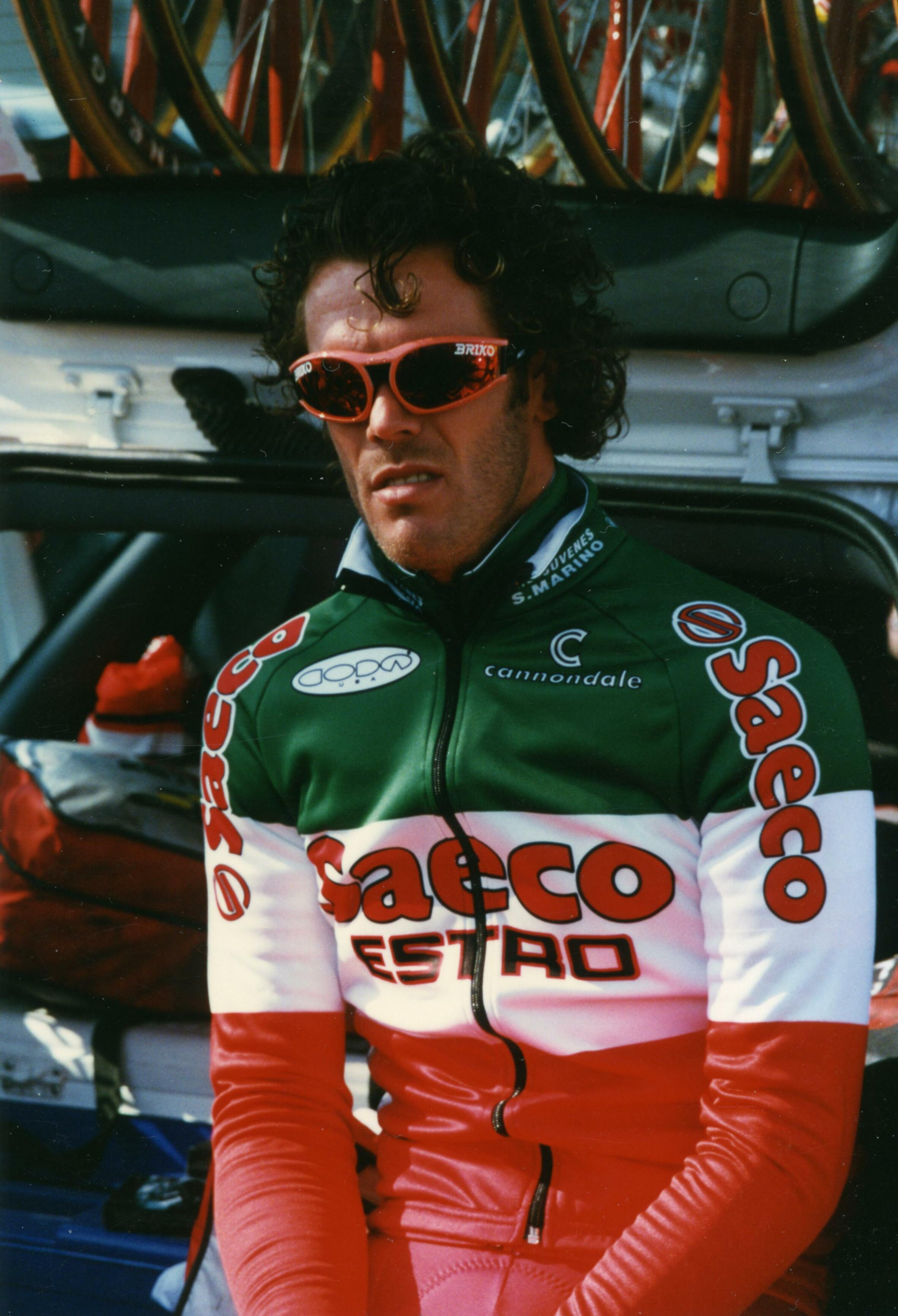
Mario Cipollini wears a now sponsored maglia tricolore in 1997

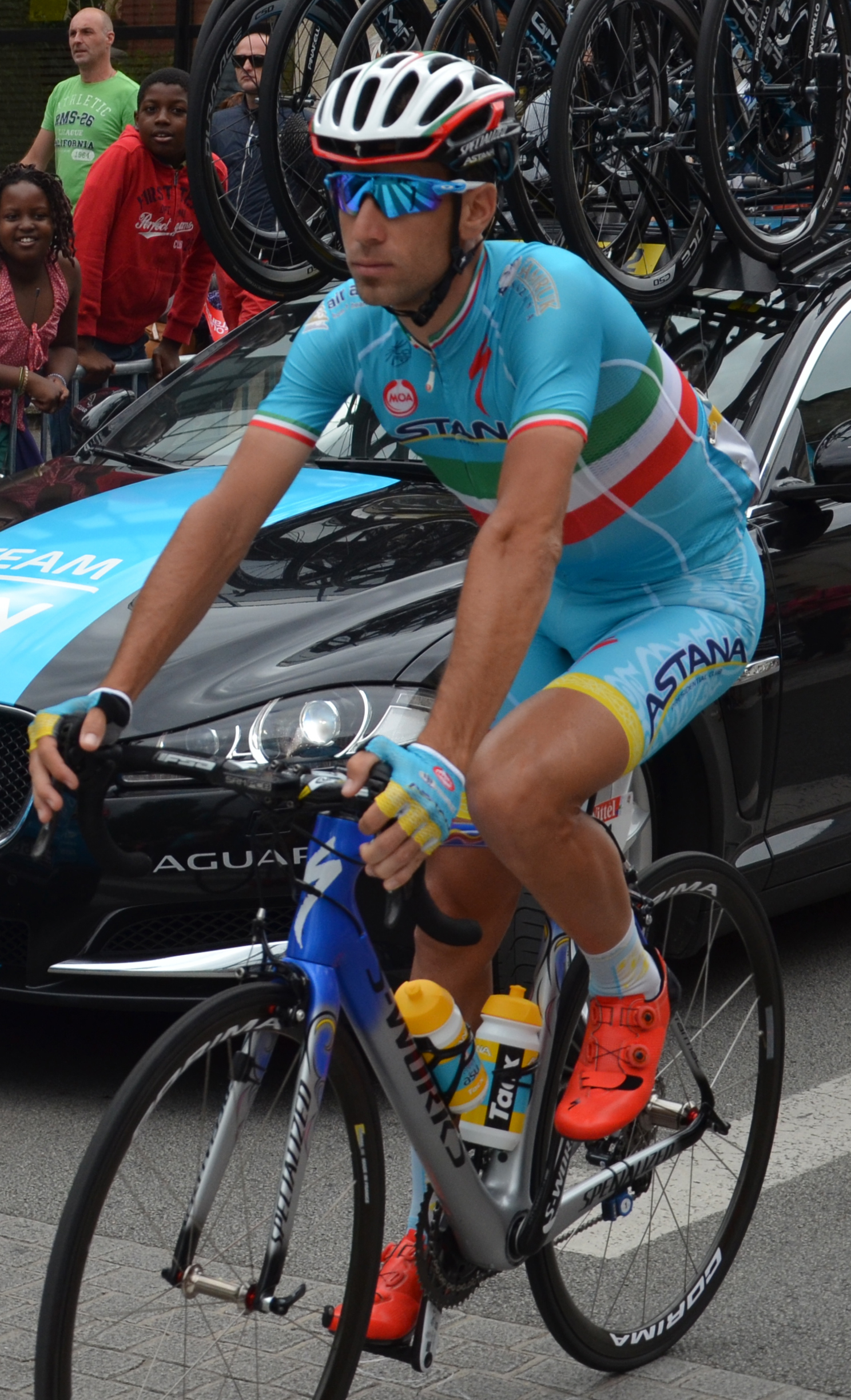
Vincenzo Nibali wears in 2015 a special maglia, which mixed the team-jersey's design and the Italian tricolore.

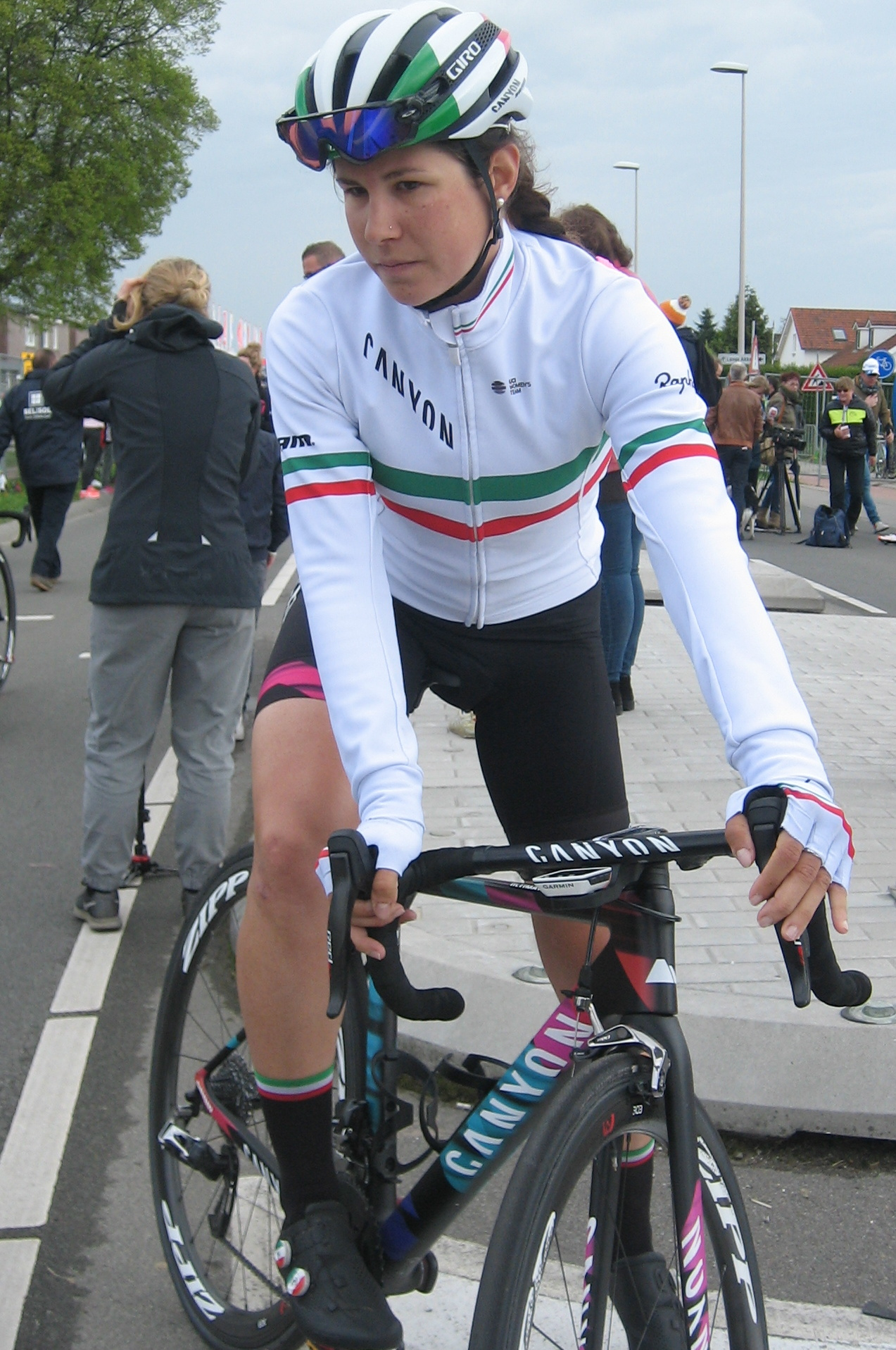
Elena Cecchini wears in 2017 a maglia tricolore in a banded template.

The Italian National Road Race Championships is a road cycling event held annually, which decides the Italian cycling champion in the road racing discipline, across several categories of riders.

The event was officially first held in 1906 (won by Giovanni Cuniolo), having been held unofficially since 1885. At the beginning there were often back-to-back wins from many riders. Costante Girardengo won the event nine times between 1913 and 1925, either side of World War I, including seven consecutive wins between 1919 and 1925. After his winning streak ended, another Italian cycling legend, Alfredo Binda, won 4 races in a row. Learco Guerra succeeded him with 5 consecutive wins. Since then the event has not been dominated to the same extent, although Fausto Coppi claimed 4 victories. Recent multiple victors have included Vincenzo Nibali, Giovanni Visconti, Paolo Bettini, Salvatore Commesso, Massimo Podenzana and Gianni Bugno. None of the men's road champions have also won the Italian National Time Trial Championships in the same year.

A women's race has been held since 1963, with the first winner being Paola Scotti. The record winner is Maria Canins with six victories.

== Multiple winners ==
=== Men ===
Wins	Rider	Years
9	Costante Girardengo	1913, 1914, 1919, 1920, 1921, 1922, 1923, 1924, 1925
5	Learco Guerra	1930, 1931, 1932, 1933, 1934
4	Alfredo Binda	1926, 1927, 1928, 1929
4	Gino Bartali	1935, 1937, 1940, 1952
4	Fausto Coppi	1942, 1947, 1949, 1955
3	Gilberto Marley	1887, 1888, 1889
3	Giovanni Cuniolo	1906, 1907, 1908
3	Fiorenzo Magni	1951, 1953, 1954
3	Franco Bitossi	1970, 1971, 1976
3	Enrico Paolini	1973, 1974, 1977
3	Francesco Moser	1975, 1979, 1981
3	Pierino Gavazzi	1978, 1982, 1988
3	Giovanni Visconti	2007, 2010, 2011
2	Dario Beni	1909, 1911
2	Ercole Baldini	1957, 1958
2	Nino Defilippis	1960, 1962
2	Michele Dancelli	1965, 1966
2	Felice Gimondi	1968, 1972
2	Claudio Corti	1985, 1986
2	Moreno Argentin	1983, 1989
2	Massimo Podenzana	1993, 1994
2	Gianni Bugno	1991, 1995
2	Salvatore Commesso	1999, 2002
2	Paolo Bettini	2003, 2006
2	Vincenzo Nibali	2014, 2015
2	Giacomo Nizzolo	2018, 2020

=== Women ===
Wins	Rider	Years
6	Maria Canins	1982, 1984, 1985, 1987, 1988, 1989
6	Elisa Longo Borghini	2017, 2020, 2021, 2023, 2024, 2025
4	Maria Cressari	1964, 1968, 1972, 1973
4	Fabiana Luperini	1996, 2004, 2006, 2008
3	Elena Cecchini	2014, 2015, 2016
2	Luigina Bissoli	1975, 1977
2	Imelda Chiappa	1993, 1997
2	Lucia Pizzolotto	1991, 1998
2	Monia Baccaille	2009, 2010

== Men ==
=== Elite ===
Year	Gold	Silver	Bronze
1885	Giuseppe Loretz	Adolfo Mazza	Cesare Larroque
1886	Geo Davidson	Giuseppe Loretz	Romeo Tas
1887	Gilberto Marley	Adolfo Mazza	Paolo Faruffini
1888	Gilberto Marley	Ambrogio Robecchi	Giacomo Capella
1889	Gilberto Marley	Cesare Buttolo	Luigi Storero
1890	Carlo Braida	De Paoli	Luigi Cantù
1891	Ambrogio Robecchi	Luigi Cantù	Giuseppe Berti
1892	Luigi Cantù	Ruscelli	Enrico Tarlarini
1893	Giuseppe Moreschi	Arturo Nuvolari	Carlo Dani
1894– 1895	Not held		
1896	Giovanni da Montelatico	Degrez	
1897– 1905	Not held		
1906	Giovanni Cuniolo	Battista Danesi	Mario Fortuna
1907	Giovanni Cuniolo	Felice Galazzi	Giovanni Rossignoli
1908	Giovanni Cuniolo	Carlo Galetti	Pierino Albini
1909	Dario Beni	Carlo Bruschera	Giovanni Cuniolo
1910	Emilio Petiva	Luigi Ganna	Eberardo Pavesi
1911	Dario Beni	Ugo Agostoni	Vincenzo Borgarello
1912	~~Angelo Gremo~~	~~Dario Beni~~	Giuseppe Azzini
1913	Costante Girardengo	Lauro Bordin	Emanuele Garda
1914	Costante Girardengo	Luigi Lucotti	Giuseppe Azzini
1915– 1918	Not held due to World War I		
1919	Costante Girardengo	Alfredo Sivocci	Luigi Lucotti
1920	Costante Girardengo	Gaetano Belloni	Giovanni Brunero
1921	Costante Girardengo	Giovanni Brunero	Federico Gay
1922	Costante Girardengo	Bartolomeo Aimo	Giovanni Brunero
1923	Costante Girardengo	Giovanni Brunero	Federico Gay
1924	Costante Girardengo	Federico Gay	Michele Gordini
1925	Costante Girardengo	Alfredo Binda	Gaetano Belloni
1926	Alfredo Binda	Costante Girardengo	Giovanni Brunero
1927	Alfredo Binda	Domenico Piemontesi	Giuseppe Pancera
1928	Alfredo Binda	Antonio Negrini	Costante Girardengo
1929	Alfredo Binda	Antonio Negrini	Domenico Piemontesi
1930	Learco Guerra	Alfredo Binda	Allegro Grandi
1931	Learco Guerra	Fabio Battesini	Luigi Giacobbe
1932	Learco Guerra	Remo Bertoni	Alfredo Binda
1933	Learco Guerra	Remo Bertoni	Alfredo Bovet
1934	Learco Guerra	Mario Cipriani	Aldo Canazza
1935	Gino Bartali	Aldo Bini	Vasco Bergamaschi
1936	Giuseppe Olmo	Giovanni Cazzulani	Olimpio Bizzi
1937	Gino Bartali	Cesare Del Cancia	Olimpio Bizzi
1938	Olimpio Bizzi	Gino Bartali	Glauco Servadei
1939	Mario Vicini	Pietro Rimoldi	Diego Marabelli
1940	Gino Bartali	Pietro Rimoldi	Osvaldo Bailo
1941	Adolfo Leoni	Aldo Bini	Cino Cinelli
1942	Fausto Coppi	Mario Ricci	Gino Bartali
1943	Mario Ricci	Fiorenzo Magni	Glauco Servadei
1944	Not held		
1945	Severino Canavesi	Glauco Servadei	Sergio Maggini
1946	Aldo Ronconi	Gino Bartali	Vito Ortelli
1947	Fausto Coppi	Vito Ortelli	Mario Ricci
1948	Vito Ortelli	Fausto Coppi	Luciano Maggini
1949	Fausto Coppi	Luciano Maggini	Adolfo Leoni
1950	Antonio Bevilacqua	Alfredo Martini	Mario Ricci
1951	Fiorenzo Magni	Gino Bartali	Antonio Bevilacqua
1952	Gino Bartali	Giuseppe Minardi	Rinaldo Moresco
1953	Fiorenzo Magni	Nino Defilippis	Loretto Petrucci
1954	Fiorenzo Magni	Fausto Coppi	Giuseppe Minardi
1955	Fausto Coppi	Giuseppe Minardi	Fiorenzo Magni
1956	Giorgio Albani	Cleto Maule	Pierino Baffi
1957	Ercole Baldini	Alfredo Sabbadin	Giorgio Albani
1958	Ercole Baldini	Nino Defilippis	Aldo Moser
1959	Diego Ronchini	Adriano Zamboni	Angelo Conterno
1960	Nino Defilippis	Rino Benedetti	Angelo Conterno
1961	Arturo Sabbadin	Arnaldo Pambianco	Giuliano Bernardelle
1962	Nino Defilippis	Guido Carlesi	Franco Cribiori
1963	Bruno Mealli	Vendramino Bariviera	Walter Martin
1964	Guido De Rosso	Franco Cribiori	Italo Zilioli
1965	Michele Dancelli	Vittorio Adorni	Franco Cribiori
1966	Michele Dancelli	Italo Zilioli	Vito Taccone
1967	Franco Balmamion	Michele Dancelli	Vittorio Adorni
1968	Felice Gimondi	Vito Taccone	Michele Dancelli
1969	Vittorio Adorni	Vito Taccone	Italo Zilioli
1970	Franco Bitossi	Felice Gimondi	Marino Basso
1971	Franco Bitossi (2)	Felice Gimondi	Enrico Paolini
1972	Felice Gimondi	Franco Bitossi	Michele Dancelli
1973	Enrico Paolini	Marcello Bergamo	Italo Zilioli
1974	Enrico Paolini (2)	Felice Gimondi	Marino Basso
1975	Francesco Moser	Valerio Lualdi	Tino Conti
1976	Franco Bitossi (3)	Francesco Moser	Wladimiro Panizza
1977	Enrico Paolini (3)	Marcello Bergamo	Francesco Moser
1978	Pierino Gavazzi	Francesco Moser	Giuseppe Saronni
1979	Francesco Moser (2)	Giovanni Battaglin	Claudio Bortolotto
1980	Giuseppe Saronni	Giovanni Battaglin	Gianbattista Baronchelli
1981	Francesco Moser (3)	Wladimiro Panizza	Alfredo Chinetti
1982	Pierino Gavazzi (2)	Claudio Torelli	Gianbattista Baronchelli
1983	Moreno Argentin	Giovanni Battaglin	Alessandro Paganessi
1984	Vittorio Algeri	Silvano Contini	Daniele Caroli
1985	Claudio Corti	Stefano Colagè	Stefano Giuliani
1986	Claudio Corti (2)	Roberto Visentini	Massimo Ghirotto
1987	Bruno Leali	Alberto Elli	Emanuele Bombini
1988	Pierino Gavazzi (3)	Giuseppe Saronni	Maurizio Fondriest
1989	Moreno Argentin (2)	Gianni Bugno	Giorgio Furlan
1990	Giorgio Furlan	Roberto Pelliconi	Flavio Giupponi
1991	Gianni Bugno	Franco Chioccioli	Claudio Chiappucci
1992	Marco Giovannetti	Gianni Faresin	Maurizio Fondriest
1993	Massimo Podenzana	Gianni Bugno	Davide Cassani
1994	Massimo Podenzana (2)	Francesco Casagrande	Gianni Faresin
1995	Gianni Bugno (2)	Paolo Lanfranchi	Andrea Tafi
1996	Mario Cipollini	Mario Traversoni	Endrio Leoni
1997	Gianni Faresin	Francesco Casagrande	Valentino Fois
1998	Andrea Tafi	Daniele Nardello	Alberto Elli
1999	Salvatore Commesso	Roberto Petito	Alberto Elli
2000	Michele Bartoli	Gilberto Simoni	Daniele Nardello
2001	Daniele Nardello	Michele Bartoli	Daniele De Paoli
2002	Salvatore Commesso (2)	Dario Frigo	Francesco Casagrande
2003	Paolo Bettini	Filippo Pozzato	Salvatore Commesso
2004	Cristian Moreni	Sergio Marinangeli	Mauro Gerosa
2005	Enrico Gasparotto	Filippo Pozzato	Massimo Giunti
2006	Paolo Bettini (2)	Mirko Celestino	Danilo Di Luca
2007	Giovanni Visconti	Paolo Bossoni	Davide Rebellin
2008	Filippo Simeoni	Giovanni Visconti	Filippo Pozzato
2009	Filippo Pozzato	Damiano Cunego	Luca Paolini
2010	Giovanni Visconti (2)	Ivan Santaromita	Alessandro Ballan
2011	Giovanni Visconti (3)	Mauro Santambrogio	Simone Ponzi
2012	Franco Pellizotti	Danilo Di Luca	Moreno Moser
2013	Ivan Santaromita	Michele Scarponi	Davide Rebellin
2014	Vincenzo Nibali	Davide Formolo	Matteo Rabottini
2015	Vincenzo Nibali (2)	~~Francesco Reda~~	Diego Ulissi
2016	Giacomo Nizzolo	Gianluca Brambilla	Filippo Pozzato
2017	Fabio Aru	Diego Ulissi	Rinaldo Nocentini
2018	Elia Viviani	Giovanni Visconti	Domenico Pozzovivo
2019	Davide Formolo	Sonny Colbrelli	Domenico Pozzovivo
2020	Giacomo Nizzolo (2)	Davide Ballerini	Sonny Colbrelli
2021	Sonny Colbrelli	Fausto Masnada	Samuele Zoccarato
2022	Filippo Zana	Lorenzo Rota	Samuele Battistella
2023	Simone Velasco	Lorenzo Rota	Kristian Sbaragli
2024	Alberto Bettiol	Lorenzo Rota	Edoardo Zambanini
2025	Filippo Conca	Alessandro Covi	Thomas Pesenti

=== U23 ===
Year	Gold	Silver	Bronze
1996	Roberto Fortunato	Pasquale Santoro	Paolo Bettini
1997	Oscar Mason	Cristian Gobbi	Claudio Sironi
1998	Danilo Di Luca	Denis Lunghi	Rinaldo Nocentini
1999	Simone Fadini	Angelo Lopeboselli	Paolo Tiralongo
2000	Nicola Gavazzi	Manuel Bortolotto	Federico Berta
2001	Marco Corsini	Alberto Loddo	Giovanni Brugaletta
2002	Paolo Bailetti	Diego Genovesi	Emanuele Sella
2003	Giovanni Visconti	Aristide Ratti	Stefano Bonini
2004	Riccardo Riccò	Carlo Scognamiglio	Nicola Peccolo
2005	Adriano Angeloni	Alessio Ricciardi	Marco Panchetti
2006	Francesco Gavazzi	Maurizio Girardini	Marco Stefani
2007	Simone Ponzi	Michele Gaia	Mauro Finetto
2008	Damiano Caruso	Alberto Contoli	Stefano Pirazzi
2009	Matteo Rabottini	Alfredo Balloni	Gianluca Brambilla
2010	Stefano Agostini	Stefano Locatelli	Tommaso Salvetti
2011	Matteo Trentin	Fabio Aru	Andrea Fedi
2012	Francesco Manuel Bongiorno	Davide Formolo	Kristian Sbaragli
2013	Andrea Zordan	Davide Villella	Alberto Bettiol
2014	Simone Sterbini	Simone Andreetta	Luca Chirico
2015	Gianni Moscon	Davide Gabburo	Edward Ravasi
2016	Simone Consonni	Vincenzo Albanese	Filippo Rocchetti
2017	Matteo Moschetti	Mirco Sartori	Raffaele Radice
2018	Edoardo Affini	Alberto Dainese	Michele Corradini
2019	Marco Frigo	Nicolas Dalla Valle	Filippo Zana
2020	Giovanni Aleotti	Alessandro Santaromita	Luca Colnaghi
2021	Gabriele Benedetti	Filippo Baroncini	Mattia Petrucci
2022	Lorenzo Germani	Walter Calzoni	Emanuele Ansaloni
2023	Francesco Busatto	Luca Cretti	Dario Igor Belletta
2024	Edoardo Zamperini	Nicola Rossi	Pietro Mattio
2025	Alessandro Borgo	Dario Igor Belletta	Simone Gualdi

== Women ==
Year	Gold	Silver	Bronze
1963	Paola Scotti	Florinda Parenti	Anna Santini
1964	Maria Cressari	Paola Scotti	Elisabetta Maffeis
1965	Florinda Parenti	Elisabetta Maffeis	Anna Santini
1966	Elisabetta Maffeis	Florinda Parenti	Giuditta Longari
1967	Rosa D'Angelo	Morena Tartagni	Ivana Panzi
1968	Maria Cressari	Carla Bosio	Ivana Panzi
1969	Morena Tartagni	Maria Cressari	Carla Bosio
1970	Giuditta Longari	Morena Tartagni	Angela Marchesin
1971	Ivana Panzi	Morena Tartagni	Elisabetta Maffeis
1972	Maria Cressari	Elisabetta Maffeis	Morena Tartagni
1973	Maria Cressari	Morena Tartagni	Gianna Brovedano
1974	Carmen Menegaldo	Giuseppa Micheloni	Emanuela Menuzzo
1975	Luigina Bissoli	Maria Cressari	Morena Tartagni
1976	Bruna Cancelli	Patrizia Cassani	Rita Coden
1977	Luigina Bissoli	Bruna Cancelli	Adalberta Marcucetti
1978	Rossella Galbiati	Francesca Galli	Anna Morlacchi
1979	Francesca Galli	Giuseppa Micheloni	Cristina Minuzzo
1980	Michela Tommasi	Rossella Galbiati	Lorena Moscon
1981	Rosanna Piantoni	Rossella Galbiati	Adalberta Marcuccetti
1982	Maria Canins	Francesca Galli	Adalberta Marcuccetti
1983	Patrizia Spadaccini	Adalberta Marcuccetti	Luisa Seghezzi
1984	Maria Canins	Roberta Bonanomi	Adalberta Marcuccetti
1985	Maria Canins	Mara Mosole	Emanuela Menuzzo
1986	Luisa Seghezzi	Imelda Chiappa	Maria Canins
1987	Maria Canins	Monica Bandini	Imelda Chiappa
1988	Maria Canins	Imelda Chiappa	Monica Bandini
1989	Maria Canins	Elisabetta Fanton	Gabriella Pregnolato
1990	Elisabetta Fanton	Valeria Cappellotto	Imelda Chiappa
1991	Lucia Pizzolotto	Valeria Cappellotto	Nadia Stramigioli
1992	Michela Fanini	Nadia Molteni	Valeria Cappellotto
1993	Imelda Chiappa	Michela Fanini	Sara Felloni
1994	Simona Muzzioli	Alessandra Cappellotto	Lucia Pizzolotto
1995	Roberta Ferrero	Alessandra Cappellotto	Nadia Molteni
1996	Fabiana Luperini	Imelda Chiappa	Alessandra Cappellotto
1997	Imelda Chiappa (2)	Alessandra Cappellotto	Valeria Cappellotto
1998	Lucia Pizzolotto	Roberta Bonanomi	Sara Felloni
1999	Valeria Cappellotto	Sonia Rocca	Lucia Pizzolotto
2000	Gabriella Pregnolato	Greta Zocca	Sara Felloni
2001	Greta Zocca	Katia Longhin	Lisa Gatto
2002	Rosalisa Lapomarda	Katia Longhin	Luisa Tamanini
2003	Alessandra Cappellotto	Alessandra D'Ettorre	Katia Longhin
2004	Fabiana Luperini (2)	Tania Belvederesi	Alessandra Cappellotto
2005	Silvia Parietti	Giuseppina Grassi	Luisa Tamanini
2006	Fabiana Luperini (3)	Gessica Turato	Silvia Parietti
2007	Eva Lechner	Luisa Tamanini	Giorgia Bronzini
2008	Fabiana Luperini (4)	Tatiana Guderzo	Giorgia Bronzini
2009	Monia Baccaille	Laura Bozzolo	Giorgia Bronzini
2010	Monia Baccaille (2)	Alessandra D'Ettorre	Lorena Foresi
2011	Noemi Cantele	Tatiana Guderzo	Silvia Valsecchi
2012	Giada Borgato	Silvia Valsecchi	Marta Bastianelli
2013	Dalia Muccioli	Giorgia Bronzini	Rossella Ratto
2014	Elena Cecchini	Valentina Scandolara	Maria Giulia Confalonieri
2015	Elena Cecchini (2)	Elisa Longo Borghini	Dalia Muccioli
2016	Elena Cecchini (3)	Elisa Longo Borghini	Anna Zita Maria Stricker
2017	Elisa Longo Borghini	Giorgia Bronzini	Soraya Paladin
2018	Marta Cavalli	Sofia Bertizzolo	Giorgia Bronzini
2019	Marta Bastianelli	Elisa Balsamo	Ilaria Sanguineti
2020	Elisa Longo Borghini (2)	Katia Ragusa	Marta Cavalli
2021	Elisa Longo Borghini (3)	Tatiana Guderzo	Ilaria Sanguineti
2022	Elisa Balsamo	Rachele Barbieri	Barbara Guarischi
2023	Elisa Longo Borghini (4)	Silvia Persico	Marta Cavalli
2024	Elisa Longo Borghini (5)	Chiara Consonni	Eleonora Gasparrini
2025	Elisa Longo Borghini (6)	Monica Trinca Colonel	Eleonora Ciabocco

== See also ==
- Italian National Time Trial Championships
- Maglia tricolore
- National road cycling championships
