= Cappellotto =

Cappellotto is an Italian surname. Notable people with the surname include:

- Alessandra Cappellotto (born 1968), Italian cyclist
- Valeria Cappellotto (1970–2015), Italian cyclist, sister of Alessandra
