= Giro del Trentino Alto Adige-Südtirol =

Women's race

Race details
- Date: June
- Region: Italy
- Discipline: Road
- Type: Stage race (until 2013, 2016); One-day race (2014, 2015, 2017)
- Web site: www.girotrentinodonne.it

History
- First edition: 1994
- Editions: 24
- Final edition: 2017
- First winner: Imelda Chiappa (ITA)
- Most wins: Fabiana Luperini (ITA) (6 wins)
- Final winner: Nikola Nosková (CZE)

Giro del Trentino Alto Adige-Südtirol was a women's cycle race held in Italy, between 1994 and 2017. In all but three of its twenty-four editions, the race was held as a stage race.

== Winners ==
Year	Winner	Second	Third
1994	Imelda Chiappa (ITA)	Roberta Bonanomi (ITA)	Fabiana Luperini (ITA)
1995	Fabiana Luperini (ITA)	Roberta Bonanomi (ITA)	Sigrid Corneo (SLO)
1996	Fabiana Luperini (ITA)	Vera Holfer (GER)	Alessandra Cappellotto (ITA)
1997	Pia Sundstedt (FIN)	Fabiana Luperini (ITA)	Barbara Hebb (SUI)
1998	Monica Bandini (ITA)	Fabiana Luperini (ITA)	Joane Somarriba (ESP)
1999	Fabiana Luperini (ITA)	Svetlana Bubnenkova (RUS)	Pia Sundstedt (FIN)
2000	Pia Sundstedt (FIN)	Fabiana Luperini (ITA)	Svetlana Bubnenkova (RUS)
2001	~~Zinaida Stahurskaya (BLR)~~	Fabiana Luperini (ITA)	Rosalisa Lapomarda (ITA)
2002	Fabiana Luperini (ITA)	Nicole Brändli (SUI)	Zinaida Stahurskaya (BLR)
2003	Luisa Tamanini (ITA)	Susanne Ljungskog (SWE)	Jolanta Polikevičiūtė (LTU)
2004	Tina Liebig (GER)	Zinaida Stahurskaya (BLR)	Modesta Vžesniauskaitė (LTU)
2005	Svetlana Bubnenkova (RUS)	Nicole Brändli (SUI)	Judith Arndt (GER)
2006	Svetlana Bubnenkova (RUS)	Nicole Brändli (SUI)	Edita Pučinskaitė (LTU)
2007	Edita Pučinskaitė (LTU)	Fabiana Luperini (ITA)	~~Svetlana Stolbova (RUS)~~
2008	Fabiana Luperini (ITA)	Mara Abbott (USA)	Claudia Häusler (GER)
2009	Nicole Cooke (GBR)	Carla Ryan (AUS)	Svetlana Stolbova (RUS)
2010	Emma Pooley (GBR)	Judith Arndt (GER)	Claudia Häusler (GER)
2011	Judith Arndt (GER)	Emma Johansson (SWE)	Tatiana Guderzo (ITA)
2012	Linda Villumsen (NZL)	Olga Zabelinskaya (RUS)	Emma Pooley (GBR)
2013	Evelyn Stevens (USA)	Tatiana Guderzo (ITA)	Tatiana Antoshina (RUS)
2014	Valentina Scandolara (ITA)	Giorgia Bronzini (ITA)	Rossella Ratto (ITA)
2015	Amanda Spratt (AUS)	Anna Zita Maria Stricker (ITA)	Lara Vieceli (ITA)
2016	Katarzyna Niewiadoma (POL)	Claudia Lichtenberg (GER)	Soraya Paladin (ITA)
2017	Nikola Nosková (CZE)	Hanna Nilsson (SWE)	Sina Frei (SUI)

== Jerseys ==
is worn by the overall leader of the race
is worn by the leader of the mountain classification
is worn by the leader of the points classification
