= La Flèche Wallonne Femmes =

Belgian one-day road cycling race

Race details
- Date: Mid April
- Region: Wallonia, Belgium
- English name: The Walloon Arrow for Women
- Discipline: Road
- Competition: UCI Women's Road Cycling World Cup (1999–2015); UCI Women's World Tour (2016–present)
- Type: One-day race
- Organiser: Amaury Sport Organisation
- Web site: www.la-fleche-wallonne-femmes.be/en/

History
- First edition: 1998
- Editions: 29 (as of 2026)
- First winner: Fabiana Luperini (ITA)
- Most wins: Anna van der Breggen (NED) (7)
- Most recent: Demi Vollering (NED)

La Flèche Wallonne Femmes is a professional women's bicycle road race held each year in Wallonia, Belgium, in April. It is part of the UCI Women's World Tour, cycling's season-long competition of top-tier races, in which it is the second-oldest single-day event after the Trofeo Alfredo Binda in Italy. The event is raced on the same day as La Flèche Wallonne for men.

La Flèche Wallonne Féminine was inaugurated by Tour de France organizers Amaury Sport Organisation (ASO) in 1998 and quickly became a road race classic. From 1999 onwards, the women's Flèche Wallonne was a UCI Women's Road Cycling World Cup event. In 2016, the race became part of the new UCI Women's World Tour. In the late 2010s, the race was rebranded as La Flèche Wallonne Femmes – making it consistent with other women's events run by ASO.

Riders from the Netherlands have dominated the event, winning 15 of the 29 editions held. Dutch rider Anna van der Breggen holds the record for the most wins, with 7 wins in succession from 2015 to 2021.

== Route ==
The race is held in conjunction with the men's race, on much of the same roads but at a shorter distance. The race starts in Huy, taking in a circuit with short and steep climbs, before a finish at the top of the steep Mur de Huy climb. Between 1998 and 2009, the route was under 100 km (62 mi) in length. From 2010 onwards, the length of the race has increased substantially – around 120 km (75 mi) to 140 km (87 mi) in length, with multiple ascents of the Mur de Huy climb. The 2026 edition of the race was the longest yet, a distance of 148.2 kilometres (92.1 mi) with two ascents of the Mur de Huy.

=== Mur de Huy ===
The race finishes at the top of the steep Mur de Huy climb. Measuring 1.3 km (0.81 mi) in length with an average grade of 9.3% and some sections around 17% (up to 26% in one bend), the climb usually decides the winner of the race. Since 2010, the Mur de Huy has been tackled multiple times, with the 2022 and 2023 editions tackling the climb three times.

== Winners ==
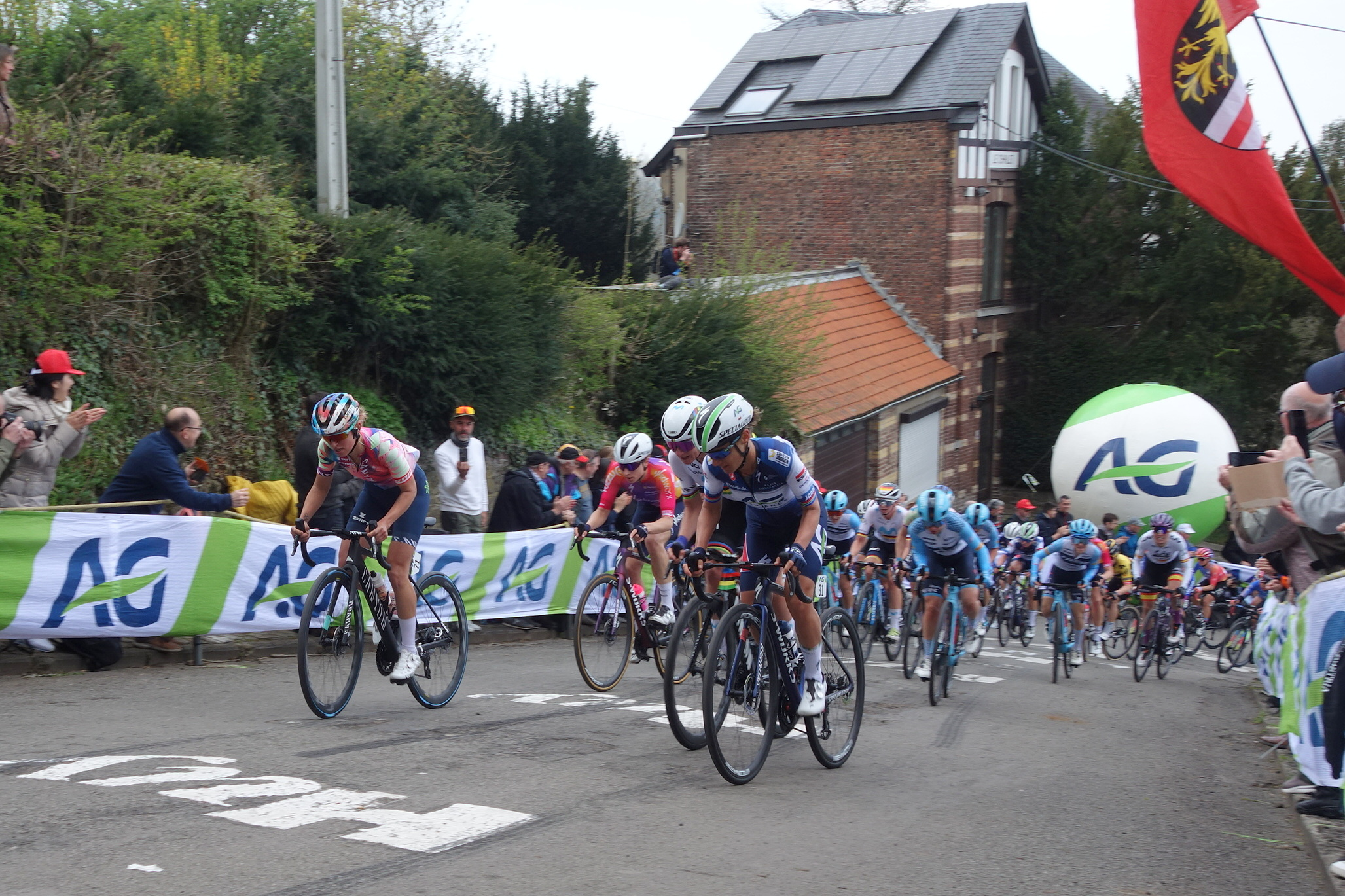
Riders climbing the Mur de Huy during the 2023 La Flèche Wallonne Femmes

Year	First	Second	Third
1998	Fabiana Luperini (ITA)	Pia Sundstedt (FIN)	Catherine Marsal (FRA)
1999	Hanka Kupfernagel (GER)	Edita Pučinskaitė (LTU)	Cindy Pieters (BEL)
2000	Geneviève Jeanson (CAN)	Pia Sundstedt (FIN)	Fany Lecourtois (FRA)
2001	Fabiana Luperini (ITA)	Anna Millward (AUS)	Trixi Worrack (GER)
2002	Fabiana Luperini (ITA)	Lyne Bessette (CAN)	Priska Doppmann (SUI)
2003	Nicole Cooke (GBR)	Susan Palmer-Komar (CAN)	Priska Doppmann (SUI)
2004	Sonia Huguet (FRA)	Hanka Kupfernagel (GER)	Edita Pučinskaitė (LTU)
2005	Nicole Cooke (GBR)	Oenone Wood (AUS)	Judith Arndt (GER)
2006	Nicole Cooke (GBR)	Judith Arndt (GER)	Trixi Worrack (GER)
2007	Marianne Vos (NED)	Nicole Cooke (GBR)	Judith Arndt (GER)
2008	Marianne Vos (NED)	Marta Bastianelli (ITA)	Judith Arndt (GER)
2009	Marianne Vos (NED)	Emma Johansson (SWE)	Claudia Häusler (GER)
2010	Emma Pooley (GBR)	Nicole Cooke (GBR)	Emma Johansson (SWE)
2011	Marianne Vos (NED)	Emma Johansson (SWE)	Judith Arndt (GER)
2012	Evelyn Stevens (USA)	Marianne Vos (NED)	Linda Villumsen (NZL)
2013	Marianne Vos (NED)	Elisa Longo Borghini (ITA)	Ashleigh Moolman (RSA)
2014	Pauline Ferrand-Prévot (FRA)	Lizzie Armitstead (GBR)	Elisa Longo Borghini (ITA)
2015	Anna van der Breggen (NED)	Annemiek van Vleuten (NED)	Megan Guarnier (USA)
2016	Anna van der Breggen (NED)	Evelyn Stevens (USA)	Megan Guarnier (USA)
2017	Anna van der Breggen (NED)	Lizzie Deignan (GBR)	Katarzyna Niewiadoma (POL)
2018	Anna van der Breggen (NED)	Ashleigh Moolman (RSA)	Megan Guarnier (USA)
2019	Anna van der Breggen (NED)	Annemiek van Vleuten (NED)	Annika Langvad (DEN)
2020	Anna van der Breggen (NED)	Cecilie Uttrup Ludwig (DEN)	Demi Vollering (NED)
2021	Anna van der Breggen (NED)	Katarzyna Niewiadoma (POL)	Elisa Longo Borghini (ITA)
2022	Marta Cavalli (ITA)	Annemiek van Vleuten (NED)	Demi Vollering (NED)
2023	Demi Vollering (NED)	Liane Lippert (GER)	Gaia Realini (ITA)
2024	Katarzyna Niewiadoma (POL)	Demi Vollering (NED)	Elisa Longo Borghini (ITA)
2025	Puck Pieterse (NED)	Demi Vollering (NED)	Elisa Longo Borghini (ITA)
2026	Demi Vollering (NED)	Puck Pieterse (NED)	Paula Blasi (ESP)

=== Multiple winners ===
Wins	Rider	Editions
7	Anna van der Breggen (NED)	2015, 2016, 2017, 2018, 2019, 2020, 2021
5	Marianne Vos (NED)	2007, 2008, 2009, 2011, 2013
3	Fabiana Luperini (ITA)	1998, 2001, 2002
3	Nicole Cooke (GBR)	2003, 2005, 2006
2	Demi Vollering (NED)	2023, 2026

=== Wins per country ===
Wins	Country
15	Netherlands
4	United Kingdom, Italy
2	France
1	Canada, Germany, Poland, United States
