= Major achievements in cycling by nation =

This article contains lists of achievements in major cycling competitions according to first-place, second-place and third-place results obtained by cyclists representing different nations. The objective is not to create combined medal tables; the focus is on listing the best positions achieved by cyclists in major international competitions, ranking the nations according to the most podiums accomplished by cyclists of these nations. All major World Championships organized by Union Cycliste Internationale (International Cycling Union, UCI) are covered, as well as cycling events at the Olympic Games.

== Results ==
For the making of the list, results from major senior-level international UCI World Championships and the cycling events at the Summer Olympics were consulted. Junior and under-23 events at the UCI World Championships were not taken into account. Results obtained by amateur athletes, or in amateur events, were considered for the list.

The conventions used on this table are:

- Road for road events at the Summer Olympics and the UCI Road World Championships
- Track for track events at the Summer Olympics and the UCI Track Cycling World Championships
- MTB for mountain bike events at the Summer Olympics
- BMX for BMX events at the Summer Olympics and the UCI BMX World Championships
- MTB&T for mountain bike events at the UCI Mountain Bike World Championships and the UCI Trials World Championships
- XCM for events held at the UCI Mountain Bike Marathon World Championships
- Urban for events held at the UCI Urban Cycling World Championships
- Cross for events held at the UCI Cyclo-cross World Championships
- Indoor for events held at the UCI Indoor Cycling World Championships

Events held at the UCI Motor-paced World Championships were counted as part of road events. Four-cross events were counted as part of the Mountain Bike and Trials World Championships (MTB&T). Indoor results comprise all artistic events as well as cycle ball events.

The following World Championships were not considered for this list:

- UCI B World Championships
- UCI Juniors World Championships
  - UCI Junior Road World Championships
  - UCI Junior Track World Championships
- UCI Para-cycling Track World Championships
- UCI Para-cycling Road World Championships

The table is pre-sorted by total number of first-place results, second-place results and third-place results, respectively. When equal ranks are given, nations are listed in alphabetical order. Defunct National Olympic Committees (NOCs) or historical teams are shown in italics.

Also, official documents from UCI credit a medal at the 1984 UCI Track Cycling World Championships to Zhou Suying as a medal for North Korea, while in reality Syuing represented China. Cyclists from North Korea have never earned medals at the UCI World Championships, and this is reflected on this list.

Last updated: August 30, 2026
		Olympic Games				UCI World Championships								Number of			
Rk.	Nation	Road	Track	MTB	BMX	Road	Track	MTB&T	XCM	BMX	Urban	Cross	Indoor	1st place, gold medalist(s)	2nd place, silver medalist(s)	3rd place, bronze medalist(s)	Total
1	France	1st place, gold medalist(s)	1st place, gold medalist(s)	1st place, gold medalist(s)	1st place, gold medalist(s)	1st place, gold medalist(s)	1st place, gold medalist(s)	1st place, gold medalist(s)	1st place, gold medalist(s)	1st place, gold medalist(s)	1st place, gold medalist(s)	1st place, gold medalist(s)	2nd place, silver medalist(s)	11	1	0	12
2	Switzerland	1st place, gold medalist(s)	1st place, gold medalist(s)	1st place, gold medalist(s)	3rd place, bronze medalist(s)	1st place, gold medalist(s)	1st place, gold medalist(s)	1st place, gold medalist(s)	1st place, gold medalist(s)	1st place, gold medalist(s)	1st place, gold medalist(s)	1st place, gold medalist(s)	1st place, gold medalist(s)	11	0	1	12
3	Great Britain	1st place, gold medalist(s)	1st place, gold medalist(s)	1st place, gold medalist(s)	1st place, gold medalist(s)	1st place, gold medalist(s)	1st place, gold medalist(s)	1st place, gold medalist(s)	2nd place, silver medalist(s)	1st place, gold medalist(s)	1st place, gold medalist(s)	1st place, gold medalist(s)		10	1	0	11
4	Germany	1st place, gold medalist(s)	1st place, gold medalist(s)	1st place, gold medalist(s)		1st place, gold medalist(s)	1st place, gold medalist(s)	1st place, gold medalist(s)	1st place, gold medalist(s)	3rd place, bronze medalist(s)	1st place, gold medalist(s)	1st place, gold medalist(s)	1st place, gold medalist(s)	10	0	1	11
5	United States	1st place, gold medalist(s)	1st place, gold medalist(s)	2nd place, silver medalist(s)	1st place, gold medalist(s)	1st place, gold medalist(s)	1st place, gold medalist(s)	1st place, gold medalist(s)	1st place, gold medalist(s)	1st place, gold medalist(s)	1st place, gold medalist(s)	2nd place, silver medalist(s)		9	2	0	11
6	Belgium	1st place, gold medalist(s)	1st place, gold medalist(s)	2nd place, silver medalist(s)		1st place, gold medalist(s)	1st place, gold medalist(s)	1st place, gold medalist(s)	1st place, gold medalist(s)	2nd place, silver medalist(s)	3rd place, bronze medalist(s)	1st place, gold medalist(s)	3rd place, bronze medalist(s)	7	2	2	11
7	Netherlands	1st place, gold medalist(s)	1st place, gold medalist(s)	1st place, gold medalist(s)	1st place, gold medalist(s)	1st place, gold medalist(s)	1st place, gold medalist(s)	1st place, gold medalist(s)	2nd place, silver medalist(s)	1st place, gold medalist(s)		1st place, gold medalist(s)		9	1	0	10
8	Spain	1st place, gold medalist(s)	1st place, gold medalist(s)	3rd place, bronze medalist(s)		1st place, gold medalist(s)	1st place, gold medalist(s)	1st place, gold medalist(s)	3rd place, bronze medalist(s)		1st place, gold medalist(s)	2nd place, silver medalist(s)	1st place, gold medalist(s)	7	1	2	10
9	Italy	1st place, gold medalist(s)	1st place, gold medalist(s)	1st place, gold medalist(s)		1st place, gold medalist(s)	1st place, gold medalist(s)	1st place, gold medalist(s)	1st place, gold medalist(s)	2nd place, silver medalist(s)		1st place, gold medalist(s)		8	1	0	9
10	Czech Republic			1st place, gold medalist(s)		3rd place, bronze medalist(s)	1st place, gold medalist(s)	1st place, gold medalist(s)	1st place, gold medalist(s)	2nd place, silver medalist(s)	1st place, gold medalist(s)	1st place, gold medalist(s)	1st place, gold medalist(s)	7	1	1	9
11	Canada	2nd place, silver medalist(s)	1st place, gold medalist(s)	2nd place, silver medalist(s)		1st place, gold medalist(s)	1st place, gold medalist(s)	1st place, gold medalist(s)		2nd place, silver medalist(s)	2nd place, silver medalist(s)			4	5	0	9
12	Australia	1st place, gold medalist(s)	1st place, gold medalist(s)		1st place, gold medalist(s)	1st place, gold medalist(s)	1st place, gold medalist(s)	1st place, gold medalist(s)		1st place, gold medalist(s)	1st place, gold medalist(s)			8	0	0	8
13	Austria	1st place, gold medalist(s)	1st place, gold medalist(s)			2nd place, silver medalist(s)	1st place, gold medalist(s)	1st place, gold medalist(s)	1st place, gold medalist(s)		1st place, gold medalist(s)		1st place, gold medalist(s)	7	1	0	8
14	Denmark	1st place, gold medalist(s)	1st place, gold medalist(s)			1st place, gold medalist(s)	1st place, gold medalist(s)	1st place, gold medalist(s)	1st place, gold medalist(s)	3rd place, bronze medalist(s)		1st place, gold medalist(s)		7	0	1	8
14	Norway	3rd place, bronze medalist(s)	1st place, gold medalist(s)	1st place, gold medalist(s)		1st place, gold medalist(s)	1st place, gold medalist(s)	1st place, gold medalist(s)	1st place, gold medalist(s)	1st place, gold medalist(s)				7	0	1	8
16	Colombia	2nd place, silver medalist(s)	3rd place, bronze medalist(s)		1st place, gold medalist(s)	1st place, gold medalist(s)	1st place, gold medalist(s)	2nd place, silver medalist(s)	1st place, gold medalist(s)	1st place, gold medalist(s)				5	2	1	8
17	Poland	2nd place, silver medalist(s)	2nd place, silver medalist(s)	2nd place, silver medalist(s)		1st place, gold medalist(s)	1st place, gold medalist(s)	1st place, gold medalist(s)	1st place, gold medalist(s)			2nd place, silver medalist(s)		4	4	0	8
18	New Zealand		1st place, gold medalist(s)		2nd place, silver medalist(s)	1st place, gold medalist(s)	1st place, gold medalist(s)	1st place, gold medalist(s)	1st place, gold medalist(s)	1st place, gold medalist(s)				6	1	0	7
19	Russia	1st place, gold medalist(s)	1st place, gold medalist(s)	3rd place, bronze medalist(s)		1st place, gold medalist(s)	1st place, gold medalist(s)	1st place, gold medalist(s)	2nd place, silver medalist(s)					5	1	1	7
20	South Africa	2nd place, silver medalist(s)	2nd place, silver medalist(s)	3rd place, bronze medalist(s)			1st place, gold medalist(s)	1st place, gold medalist(s)	2nd place, silver medalist(s)	2nd place, silver medalist(s)				2	4	1	7
21	Portugal	2nd place, silver medalist(s)	1st place, gold medalist(s)			1st place, gold medalist(s)	1st place, gold medalist(s)		1st place, gold medalist(s)				1st place, gold medalist(s)	5	1	0	6
21	West Germany	2nd place, silver medalist(s)	1st place, gold medalist(s)			1st place, gold medalist(s)	1st place, gold medalist(s)					1st place, gold medalist(s)	1st place, gold medalist(s)	5	1	0	6
		Olympic Games				UCI World Championships								Number of			
Rk.	Nation	Road	Track	MTB	BMX	Road	Track	MTB&T	XCM	BMX	Urban	Cross	Indoor	1st place, gold medalist(s)	2nd place, silver medalist(s)	3rd place, bronze medalist(s)	Total
23	Czechoslovakia	3rd place, bronze medalist(s)	1st place, gold medalist(s)			2nd place, silver medalist(s)	1st place, gold medalist(s)					1st place, gold medalist(s)	1st place, gold medalist(s)	4	1	1	6
23	Sweden	1st place, gold medalist(s)		1st place, gold medalist(s)		1st place, gold medalist(s)	3rd place, bronze medalist(s)	1st place, gold medalist(s)			2nd place, silver medalist(s)			4	1	1	6
25	East Germany	1st place, gold medalist(s)	1st place, gold medalist(s)			1st place, gold medalist(s)	1st place, gold medalist(s)						1st place, gold medalist(s)	5	0	0	5
26	Argentina		1st place, gold medalist(s)		1st place, gold medalist(s)		1st place, gold medalist(s)	3rd place, bronze medalist(s)		1st place, gold medalist(s)				4	0	1	5
26	China		1st place, gold medalist(s)		1st place, gold medalist(s)		1st place, gold medalist(s)	3rd place, bronze medalist(s)			1st place, gold medalist(s)			4	0	1	5
28	Latvia	3rd place, bronze medalist(s)			1st place, gold medalist(s)	1st place, gold medalist(s)	2nd place, silver medalist(s)			1st place, gold medalist(s)				3	1	1	5
29	Brazil					2nd place, silver medalist(s)		2nd place, silver medalist(s)	1st place, gold medalist(s)	1st place, gold medalist(s)	2nd place, silver medalist(s)			2	3	0	5
29	Japan		2nd place, silver medalist(s)				1st place, gold medalist(s)	2nd place, silver medalist(s)			1st place, gold medalist(s)		2nd place, silver medalist(s)	2	3	0	5
31	Ukraine		2nd place, silver medalist(s)			1st place, gold medalist(s)	1st place, gold medalist(s)	3rd place, bronze medalist(s)			2nd place, silver medalist(s)			2	2	1	5
32	Soviet Union	1st place, gold medalist(s)	1st place, gold medalist(s)			1st place, gold medalist(s)	1st place, gold medalist(s)							4	0	0	4
33	Slovenia	1st place, gold medalist(s)				1st place, gold medalist(s)		1st place, gold medalist(s)	2nd place, silver medalist(s)					3	1	0	4
34	Greece	1st place, gold medalist(s)	2nd place, silver medalist(s)				2nd place, silver medalist(s)		1st place, gold medalist(s)					2	2	0	4
34	Slovakia					1st place, gold medalist(s)		1st place, gold medalist(s)		2nd place, silver medalist(s)			2nd place, silver medalist(s)	2	2	0	4
36	Lithuania	3rd place, bronze medalist(s)				1st place, gold medalist(s)	1st place, gold medalist(s)			3rd place, bronze medalist(s)				2	0	2	4
37	Belarus		3rd place, bronze medalist(s)			1st place, gold medalist(s)	1st place, gold medalist(s)							2	0	1	3
37	Ireland					1st place, gold medalist(s)	1st place, gold medalist(s)	3rd place, bronze medalist(s)						2	0	1	3
39	Hong Kong		3rd place, bronze medalist(s)				1st place, gold medalist(s)						2nd place, silver medalist(s)	1	1	1	3
39	Luxembourg					1st place, gold medalist(s)	2nd place, silver medalist(s)					3rd place, bronze medalist(s)		1	1	1	3
41	Kazakhstan	1st place, gold medalist(s)				3rd place, bronze medalist(s)	3rd place, bronze medalist(s)							1	0	2	3
		Olympic Games				UCI World Championships								Number of			
Rk.	Nation	Road	Track	MTB	BMX	Road	Track	MTB&T	XCM	BMX	Urban	Cross	Indoor	1st place, gold medalist(s)	2nd place, silver medalist(s)	3rd place, bronze medalist(s)	Total
42	Hungary					2nd place, silver medalist(s)					2nd place, silver medalist(s)		3rd place, bronze medalist(s)	0	2	1	3
42	Uruguay		2nd place, silver medalist(s)			3rd place, bronze medalist(s)	2nd place, silver medalist(s)							0	2	1	3
44	Finland					3rd place, bronze medalist(s)		2nd place, silver medalist(s)	3rd place, bronze medalist(s)					0	1	2	3
45	Cuba		2nd place, silver medalist(s)				1st place, gold medalist(s)							1	1	0	2
45	Malaysia		2nd place, silver medalist(s)				1st place, gold medalist(s)							1	1	0	2
45	Mexico		2nd place, silver medalist(s)				1st place, gold medalist(s)							1	1	0	2
45	(Germany) United Team	2nd place, silver medalist(s)	1st place, gold medalist(s)											1	1	0	2
45	Venezuela				2nd place, silver medalist(s)					1st place, gold medalist(s)				1	1	0	2
50	Estonia		1st place, gold medalist(s)				3rd place, bronze medalist(s)							1	0	1	2
51	Chile							2nd place, silver medalist(s)			2nd place, silver medalist(s)			0	2	0	2
52	Ecuador	1st place, gold medalist(s)												1	0	0	1
52	Individual Neutral Athletes						1st place, gold medalist(s)							1	0	0	1
54	Barbados						2nd place, silver medalist(s)							0	1	0	1
54	Bohemia						2nd place, silver medalist(s)							0	1	0	1
54	Costa Rica										2nd place, silver medalist(s)			0	1	0	1
54	Israel						2nd place, silver medalist(s)							0	1	0	1
54	Namibia							2nd place, silver medalist(s)						0	1	0	1
54	South Korea						2nd place, silver medalist(s)							0	1	0	1
54	Russian Cycling Federation						2nd place, silver medalist(s)							0	1	0	1
54	Trinidad and Tobago						2nd place, silver medalist(s)							0	1	0	1
62	Bolivia							3rd place, bronze medalist(s)						0	0	1	1
62	Croatia										3rd place, bronze medalist(s)			0	0	1	1
62	Jamaica		3rd place, bronze medalist(s)											0	0	1	1
62	Liechtenstein						3rd place, bronze medalist(s)							0	0	1	1
62	Macau												3rd place, bronze medalist(s)	0	0	1	1
62	ROC		3rd place, bronze medalist(s)											0	0	1	1
