= Elizabeth Tabor =

Elizabeth Tabor may refer to:

- Beth Tabor (born 1964), Canadian cyclist
- Baby Doe Tabor (Elizabeth McCourt Tabor, 1854–1935), second wife of Colorado pioneer businessman Horace Tabor
