= Cycling at the 1988 Summer Olympics – Women's sprint =

Women's cycling sprint at the Games of the XXIV Olympiad
- Venue: Seoul Olympic Velodrome
- Date: 21–24 September 1988
- Competitors: 12 from 12 nations

Medalists
| 1st place, gold medalist(s) | | Erika Salumäe | Soviet Union |
| 2nd place, silver medalist(s) | | Christa Luding-Rothenburger | East Germany |
| 3rd place, bronze medalist(s) | | Connie Paraskevin | United States |

The women's track cycling sprint competition at the 1988 Summer Olympics was held from 21 to 24 September. Estonian rider competing for the USSR Erika Salumäe won gold, while East Germany's Christa Luding-Rothenburger won silver and Connie Paraskevin-Young of the United States won bronze.

== Competition format ==
The competition was held as a knock-out tournament, preceded by a qualifying round.

The qualifying round had all participants complete one timed individual sprint, with their times deciding seeding in the eighth-finals. No cyclists were eliminated.

In the knock-out stages, the winners of each sprint progressed to the next round. The eighth-finals were held as four sprints with three cyclists in each, with following repechages for the second and third placed. The quarter-finals, semi-finals and finals were contested head-to-head, best of three sprints. In addition, a one-off four-cyclist sprint was held to decide fifth to eighth places.

== Schedule ==
| Date | Round |
|---|---|
| 21 September | Qualification |
| 21 September | 1/8 finals |
| 21 September | 1/8 repechage |
| 22 September | 1/4 finals |
| 23 September | Semi-finals |
| 23 September | Final (5th–8th places) |
| 24 September | Final |

== Results ==
=== Qualification ===
| Rank | Name | Time |
|---|---|---|
| 1 | Erika Salumäe (URS) | 11.527 OR |
| 2 | Isabelle Gautheron (FRA) | 11.611 |
| 3 | Christa Luding-Rothenburger (GDR) | 11.692 |
| 4 | Connie Paraskevin-Young (USA) | 11.845 |
| 5 | Julie Speight (AUS) | 11.955 |
| 6 | Louise Jones (GBR) | 12.287 |
| 7 | Elisabetta Fanton (ITA) | 12.303 |
| 8 | Yang Hsiu-chen (TPE) | 12.374 |
| 9 | Kim Jin-yeong (KOR) | 12.416 |
| 10 | Seiko Hashimoto (JPN) | 12.425 |
| 11 | Zhou Suying (CHN) | 12.477 |
| 12 | Beth Tabor (CAN) | 12.588 |

=== Eighth-finals ===
Heat 1
| Rank | Name | Time | Note |
|---|---|---|---|
| 1 | Erika Salumäe (URS) | 12.83 | Q |
| 2 | Yang Hsiu-chen (TPE) | | R |
| 3 | Kim Jin-yeong (KOR) | | R |

Heat 2
| Rank | Name | Time | Note |
|---|---|---|---|
| 1 | Isabelle Gautheron (FRA) | 12.22 | Q |
| 2 | Seiko Hashimoto (JPN) | | R |
| 3 | Elisabetta Fanton (ITA) | | R |

Heat 3
| Rank | Name | Time | Note |
|---|---|---|---|
| 1 | Christa Luding-Rothenburger (GDR) | 12.24 | Q |
| 2 | Zhou Suying (CHN) | | R |
| 3 | Louise Jones (GBR) | | R |

Heat 4
| Rank | Name | Time | Note |
|---|---|---|---|
| 1 | Connie Paraskevin-Young (USA) | 12.11 | Q |
| 2 | Julie Speight (AUS) | | R |
| 3 | Beth Tabor (CAN) | | R |

Q
Qualified for next round
R
Qualified for repechage

==== Repechages ====
Heat 1
| Name | Time | Note |
|---|---|---|
| Yang Hsiu-chen (TPE) | 12.80 | Q |
| Beth Tabor (CAN) | | |

Heat 2
| Name | Time | Note |
|---|---|---|
| Seiko Hashimoto (JPN) | | |
| Louise Jones (GBR) | 12.36 | Q |

Heat 3
| Name | Time | Note |
|---|---|---|
| Zhou Suying (CHN) | 12.65 | Q |
| Elisabetta Fanton (ITA) | | |

Heat 4
| Name | Time | Note |
|---|---|---|
| Julie Speight (AUS) | 13.04 | Q |
| Kim Jin-yeong (KOR) | | |

Q
Qualified for next round

=== Quarter-finals ===
Heat 1
| Name | Time 1 | Time 2 | Time 3 | Note |
|---|---|---|---|---|
| Erika Salumäe (URS) | 12.34 | 11.81 | – | Q |
| Louise Jones (GBR) | | | – | |

Heat 2
| Name | Time 1 | Time 2 | Time 3 | Note |
|---|---|---|---|---|
| Isabelle Gautheron (FRA) | 12.13 | 11.90 | – | Q |
| Yang Hsiu-chen (TPE) | | | – | |

Heat 3
| Name | Time 1 | Time 2 | Time 3 | Note |
|---|---|---|---|---|
| Christa Luding-Rothenburger (GDR) | 11.80 | 11.63 | – | Q |
| Julie Speight (AUS) | | | – | |

Heat 4
| Name | Time 1 | Time 2 | Time 3 | Note |
|---|---|---|---|---|
| Connie Paraskevin-Young (USA) | 12.85 | 12.94 | – | Q |
| Zhou Suying (CHN) | | | – | |

Q
Qualified for next round

=== Semi-finals ===
Heat 1
| Name | Time 1 | Time 2 | Time 3 | Note |
|---|---|---|---|---|
| Erika Salumäe (URS) | 12.38 | 12.22 | – | Q |
| Connie Paraskevin-Young (USA) | | | – | |

Heat 2
| Name | Time 1 | Time 2 | Time 3 | Note |
|---|---|---|---|---|
| Isabelle Gautheron (FRA) | | 11.79 | | |
| Christa Luding-Rothenburger (GDR) | 11.92 | | 11.89 | Q |

Q
Qualified for next round

=== Finals ===
Fifth to eighth places
| Rank | Name | Time | Note |
|---|---|---|---|
| 5 | Julie Speight (AUS) | 12.56 | |
| 6 | Zhou Suying (CHN) | | |
| 7 | Louise Jones (GBR) | | |
| 8 | Yang Hsiu-chen (TPE) | | |

Bronze medal final
| Rank | Name | Time 1 | Time 2 | Time 3 | Note |
|---|---|---|---|---|---|
| 3rd place, bronze medalist(s) | Connie Paraskevin-Young (USA) | 14.07 | 12.41 | – | |
| 4 | Isabelle Gautheron (FRA) | | | – | |

Gold medal final
| Rank | Name | Time 1 | Time 2 | Time 3 | Note |
|---|---|---|---|---|---|
| 1st place, gold medalist(s) | Erika Salumäe (URS) | | 12.00 | 12.58 | |
| 2nd place, silver medalist(s) | Christa Luding-Rothenburger (GDR) | 11.68 | | | |
