= Isabelle Gautheron =

French cyclist

Personal information
- Born: 3 December 1963 (age 62) Villeneuve-Saint-Georges, France

Cycling career
- Sport: Cycling

Isabelle Gautheron (born 3 December 1963) is a French former cyclist. She competed in the women's sprint event at the 1988 Summer Olympics.
