= 2024 Ronde van Drenthe (women's race) =

Cycling race

2024 UCI Women's World Tour, race 6 of 27
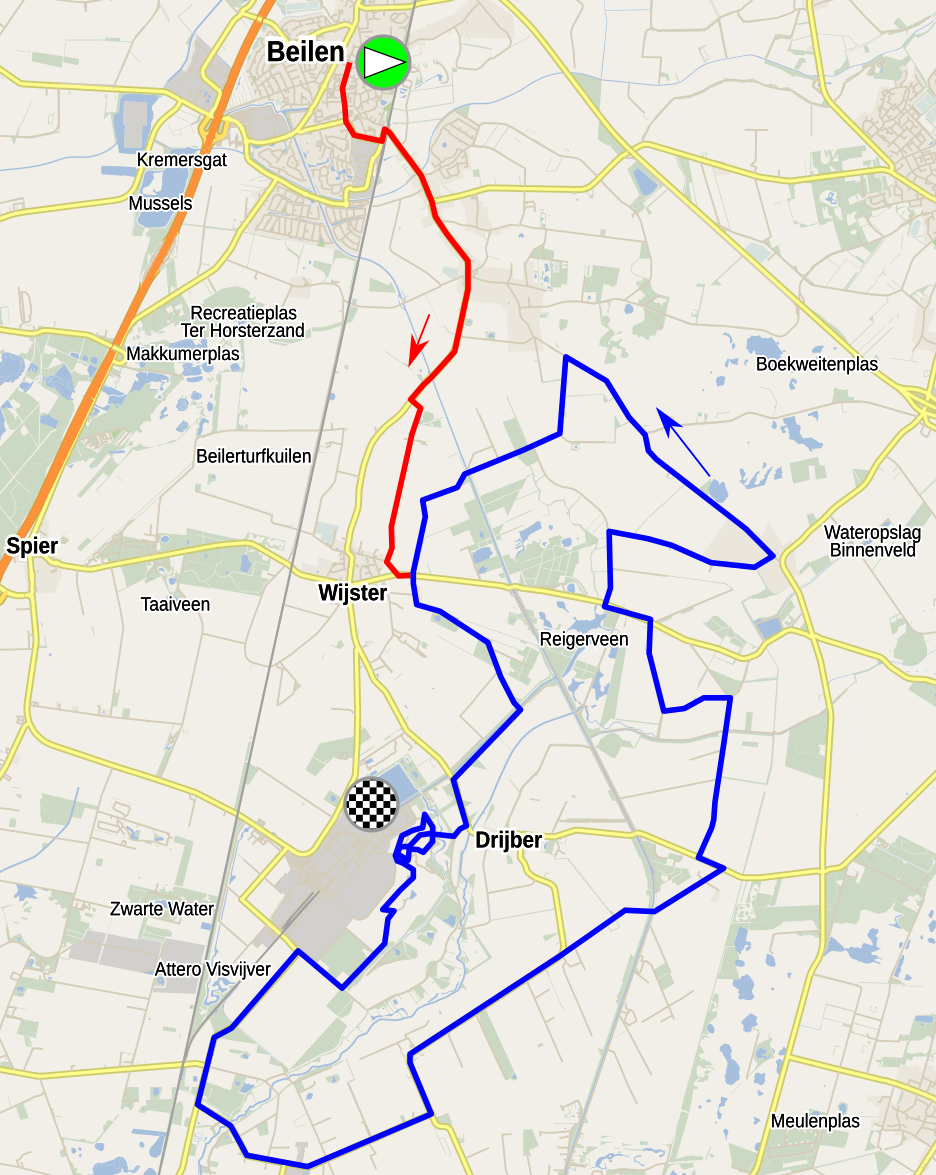

Race details
- Dates: 10 March 2024
- Stages: 1
- Distance: 158.1 km (98.24 mi)
- Winning time: 4h 09' 09"

Results
	Winner	Lorena Wiebes (NED)	(Team SD Worx–Protime)
	Second	Elisa Balsamo (ITA)	(Lidl–Trek)
	Third	Puck Pieterse (NED)	(Fenix–Deceuninck)

The 2024 Ronde van Drenthe was a Dutch road cycling one-day race on 10 March. It was the 17th edition of Ronde van Drenthe and the 6th event of the 2024 UCI Women's World Tour. The race was won by Dutch rider Lorena Wiebes of Team SD Worx–Protime.

== Route ==
The race uses generally flat roads in the Drenthe region of the Netherlands, with the challenge being multiple ascents of the VAMberg – a hill built on a landfill site. The climb is 750m in length with an average gradient of 4.2% and a maximum gradient of 20%. Other difficulties are cobbled sections on the route. Unlike prior editions of the race which finished in Hoogeveen, the 2024 race finished at the VAMberg itself, after six circuits of 29 kilometres (18 mi).

== Teams ==
Nineteen teams participated, including thirteen UCI Women's WorldTeams and eleven Women's continental teams.

UCI Women's WorldTeams

- AG Insurance–Soudal
- Canyon–SRAM
- Ceratizit–WNT Pro Cycling
- FDJ–Suez
- Fenix–Deceuninck
- Human Powered Health
- Lidl–Trek
- Liv AlUla Jayco
- Team SD Worx–Protime
- Team dsm–firmenich PostNL
- UAE Team ADQ
- Uno-X Mobility

UCI Women's Continental Teams

- Cofidis
- GT Krush Rebellease
- Hess Cycling Team
- Lifeplus Wahoo
- Lotto–Dstny Ladies
- Proximus-Cyclis CT
- VolkerWessels Women Cyclingteam

== Result ==
Result
Rank	Rider	Team	Time
1	Lorena Wiebes (NED)	Team SD Worx–Protime	4h 09' 09"
2	Elisa Balsamo (ITA)	Lidl–Trek	+ 2"
3	Puck Pieterse (NED)	Fenix–Deceuninck	+ 4"
4	Letizia Paternoster (ITA)	Liv AlUla Jayco	+ 4"
5	Victoire Berteau (FRA)	Cofidis	+ 4"
6	Vittoria Guazzini (ITA)	FDJ–Suez	+ 4"
7	Christina Schweinberger (AUT)	Fenix–Deceuninck	+ 4"
8	Maria Giulia Confalonieri (ITA)	Uno-X Mobility	+ 8"
9	Christine Majerus (LUX)	Team SD Worx–Protime	+ 11"
10	Pfeiffer Georgi (GBR)	Team dsm–firmenich PostNL	+ 12"
