= Silvia Parietti =

Italian cyclist (born 1978)

Personal information
- Born: 19 March 1978 (age 48) Italy

Cycling career
- Sport: Cycling
- Discipline: Road cycling

Professional teams
- 2005: Nobili Rubinetterie-menikini Cogeas
- 2006: Safi-Pasta Zara-Manhattan
- 2007: A.S. Team FRW
- 2008: Gauss Rdz Ormu
- 2008: Team Cmax Dila (from 25 June)

Silvia Parietti (born 19 March 1978) is a road cyclist from Italy. She represented her nation at the 2001, 2003 and 2004 UCI Road World Championships. In 2005, she won the Italian National Road Race Championships.
