= Julie Speight =

Australian cyclist

Personal information
- Full name: Julie Robyn Speight
- Born: 1 October 1966 (age 60) Sydney, New South Wales, Australia

Cycling career
- Sport: Cycling
- Disciplines: Track Sprint; Criterium
- Role: Rider
- Rider type: Sprint, Track

Amateur teams
- 1985 Coors Classic: McDonalds/Dia-Compe/Suntour
- 1993-1994: Fuji World Team
Medal record
Trcak cycling]]
Representing Australia
Commonwealth Games
Silver medal – second place	1990 Auckland	Women's Sprint

Julie Robyn Speight (born 1 October 1966) is an Australian former cyclist, eight time National champion, and Australia's first female Olympic and Commonwealth Games track cyclist, competing in the women's sprint event at the 1988 Seoul Summer Olympics and winning a silver medal in the 1990 Auckland Commonwealth Games. At the time, she was described as 'a class above any other female rider in the country.'

== Biography ==
Speight is the only Australian to have held both the national Road Race title and the national Track Sprint title in the same year (1983).

Also in 1983, Speight- along with Michelle Robbins, Elizabeth Battle, and Paula Verral- initiated 'the first organized Australian women's tour of Europe, culminating in the 1983 World road title in Switzerland.' The women self-funded their tour, with the assistance of their respective cycling clubs, as the Australian Cycling Federation refused to support any international women's racing.

In 1984 Speight qualified for the inaugural Women's Road Race at the 1984 Los Angeles Summer Olympics. Australian cycling officials, however, later reneged by electing not to send a women's team to Los Angeles. Instead, Speight was sent to the Yu King Cup Road Race in China, where she became the first Australian female cyclist to win an international race, beating several of her international opponents who went on to race in the Los Angeles Olympics later that year- the very event in which the Australian Cycling Federation disallowed Speight's entry.

When Speight started competing in the early 1980s there were only two national track events in which women could enter - the Sprint, and the Scratch Race. During her career, Speight lobbied for more women's events to be added as state and national titles, and was successful in her campaign to have a Points Race included in the 1990 Australian National Track Championships.

Speight was coached by Ken Smith (1981-1984) and John Crouchley (1986-).

In 2017 Speight was recognized for her trailblazing contribution to Australian women's cycling through her induction into the Cycling Australia Hall of Fame.

Speight lives in Hobart, Tasmania, where she is on the Executive of the Tasmanian Olympic Council and also works to raise awareness of concussion related injuries, namely Chronic traumatic encephalopathy (CTE) in athletes.

== Honours ==
In 1983, Speight was awarded the Bradley Matthews Memorial Award from Randwick City Council. In 1984 she received the Sydney Girls' High School Old Girls' Union's "Centenary Prize for Excellence", for meritorious completion of her Year 12 studies while simultaneously embarking on an international cycling career.

In 1988 she was nominated for Australian Female Athlete of the Year by the Confederation of Australian Sports. In 1989, Speight was crowned Rider of the Year at T-Town Velodrome, Trexlertown, Pennsylvania, United States, the track from which she would eventually announce her retirement from racing in 1997.

In 1994, Speight was inducted into the Randwick Sporting Hall of Fame. In 2017, Speight was the first female track sprinter to be inducted into the Cycling Australia Hall of Fame.

== Major results ==
1983
1st Sprint, Australian National Track Championships
1st Road Race, Australian National Road Championships
3rd Scratch Race, Australian National Track Championships
DNF Road Race, World Road Championships, Altenrhein Switzerland

1984
1st Road Race, Yu King Cup Road Race, Taiyuan, China

1985
1st Scratch Race, Australian National Track Championships
1st Points Race, Australia Games
3rd Individual Pursuit, Australian National Track Championships
82nd Road Race, World Track Championships, Giavera del Montello, Italy
2 x Stage wins, Niagara Classic Stage Race (known from 2016 as the Steve Bauer Classic), Ontario, Canada
2nd Wheat Thins/Mayor's Cup Series, Pittsburgh, United States

1986
3rd Scratch Race, Australian National Track Championships

1988
1st Sprint, Australian National Track Championships
1st Scratch Race, Australian National Track Championships
5th Sprint, Olympic Games, Seoul

1989
8th Points Race, World Track Championships, Lyon, France

1990
1st Points Race, Australian National Track Championships
2nd Sprint, (silver) 1990 Commonwealth Games, Auckland
3rd Sprint, Australian National Track Championships
6th Points Race, World Track Championships, Maebashi, Japan

1991
1st Sprint, Australian National Track Championships

3rd Points Race, Australian National Track Championships

3rd Mixed (Men & Women) Turkey Chase Madison, with Paul Pearson, Trexlertown, Pennsylvania, United States

1992
1st Harlem Skyscraper Classic, New York, United States
2nd Tour of Somerville, New Jersey, United States
1st Points Race, Australian National Track Championships
2nd Sprint, Australian National Track Championships
2nd Scratch Race, Australian National Track Championships
15th Points Race, World Track Championships, Valencia, Spain

1996
3rd 500m Time Trial, Australian National Track Championships
