= Puck Pieterse =

Dutch cyclist (born 2002)

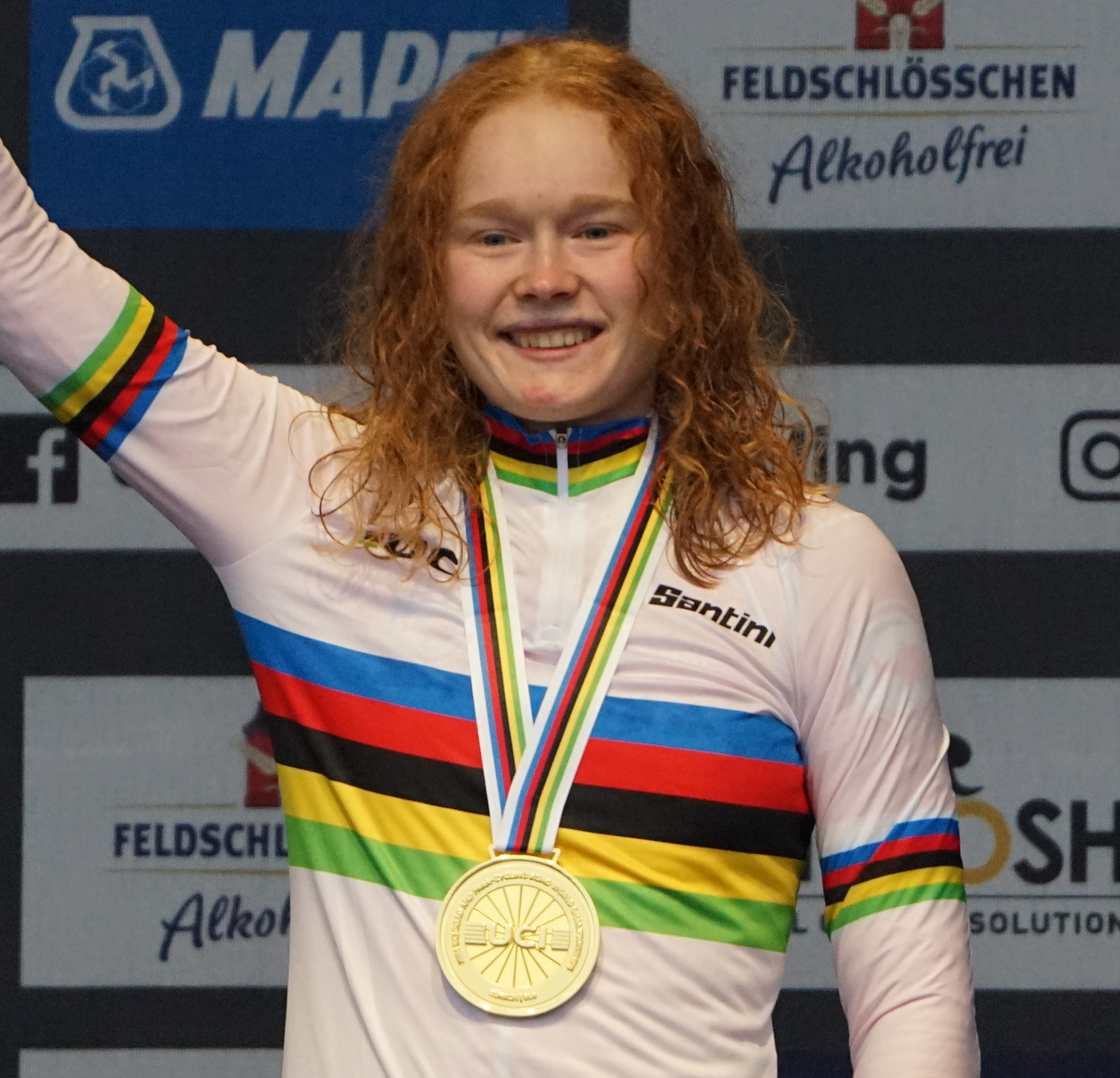
- Pieterse with her gold under-23 medal at the 2024 UCI Road World Championships

Personal information
- Born: 13 May 2002 (age 24) Amersfoort, Netherlands

Cycling career
- Sport: Cycling
- Current team: Fenix–Premier Tech
- Disciplines: Cyclo-cross; Road; Mountain bike
- Role: Rider

Professional teams
- 2020–: Alpecin–Fenix (CX, MTB)
- 2021–: Fenix–Premier Tech (Road)

Major wins
- Cyclo-cross National Championships (2023, 2025) World Cup 9 individual wins (2022–23, 2023–24, 2025–26) Mountain bike World XC Championships (2024) European XC Championships (2023, 2024) National XC Championships (2023) XC World Cup (2023) 6 individual wins (2023, 2024, 2025) Road Major Tours Tour de France Mountains classification (2026) Young rider classification (2024) 1 individual stage (2024) One-day races and Classics La Flèche Wallonne (2025)
Medal record
Representing Netherlands
Women's cyclo-cross
World Championships
Gold medal – first place	2022 Fayetteville	Under-23
Silver medal – second place	2020 Dübendorf	Junior
Silver medal – second place	2023 Hoogerheide	Elite
Bronze medal – third place	2024 Tabór	Elite
Bronze medal – third place	2025 Liévin	Elite
Bronze medal – third place	2026 Hulst	Elite
European Championships
Gold medal – first place	2019 Silvelle di Trebaseleghe	Junior
Gold medal – first place	2020 Rosmalen	Under-23
Gold medal – first place	2022 Namur	Under-23
Silver medal – second place	2021 Wijster	Under-23
Women's mountain bike racing
World Championships
Gold medal – first place	2024 Vallnord	Cross country
Silver medal – second place	2022 Les Gets	U23 Cross-country
European Games
Gold medal – first place	2023 Kraków-Małopolska	Cross-country
European Championships
Gold medal – first place	2022 Anadia	U23 Cross-country
Gold medal – first place	2022 Anadia	Mixed relay
Gold medal – first place	2023 Krynica-Zdrój	Cross-country
Gold medal – first place	2024 Cheile Grădiștei	Cross-country
Silver medal – second place	2021 Novi Sad	U23 Cross-country
Silver medal – second place	2024 Cheile Grădiștei	Cross-country short track
Bronze medal – third place	2020 Monteceneri	Junior Cross-country
Women's road bicycle racing
World Championships
Gold medal – first place	2024 Zurich	Under-23 road race

Puck Pieterse (pronounced [pʏk ˈpitərsə]; born 13 May 2002) is a Dutch cyclist specializing in road, cyclo-cross and mountain biking. She currently rides for Fenix–Premier Tech. In 2024 as under 23 world champion in the road race. Pieterse is known for her ability to bunny hop the plank barriers in cyclo-cross races.

== Life and career ==
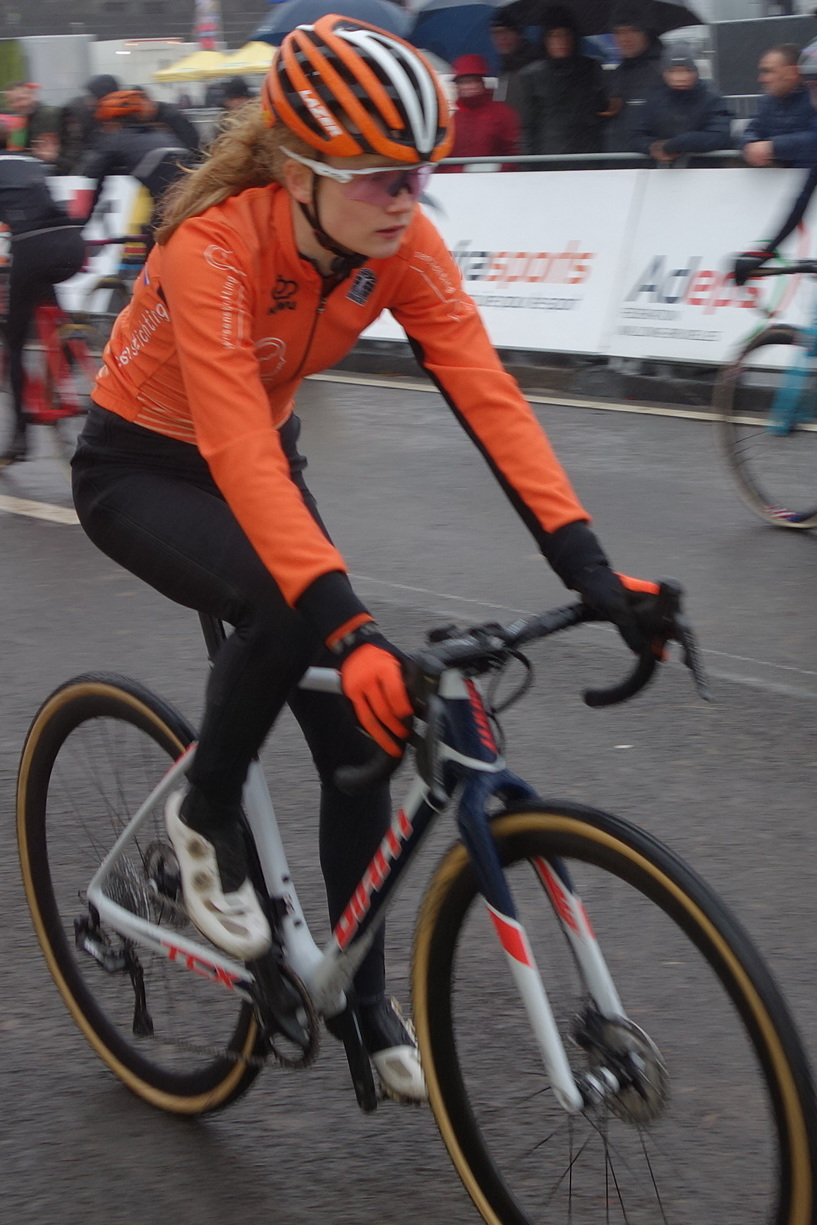
Pieterse at the 2019 Namur cyclocross World Cup

Puck Pieterse was born in Amersfoort, Netherlands. Mountain biking and cyclo-cross have been the biggest passions in her life since she was ten years old, with the support of her parents who would take her to every race she attended. In March 2020, Pieterse signed with Alpecin–Fenix with the initial focus being on cyclo-cross and mountain biking. She became the U23European cyclo-cross champion in 2020, and won the Elite Women's National Cyclocross Champion of the Netherlands in 2023 and 2024.

In 2024, she won the world mountain bike championship in the Cross-country Olympic category. At the 2024 Tour de France Femmes, Pieterse won stage 4 and took the white jersey of the young rider classification. At the 2024 UCI Road World Championships, she became under 23 world champion after finishing 13th overall. In 2025, Pieterse won her first UCI Women's World Tour event, winning La Flèche Wallonne Femmes.

Pieterse secured her first victory of the 2025–26 UCI Cyclo-cross World Cup season at the Cyclo-cross Maasmechelen event ahead of teammate Ceylin del Carmen Alvarado. Continuing her success, she completed the weekend with her win at Hoogerheide, clinching to her second World Cup win of the season.

== Major results ==
=== Cyclo-cross ===
2018–2019
1st National Junior Championships
1st Leudelange
2nd Contern
3rd Pétange
5th UEC European Under-23 Championships
2019–2020
1st UEC European Junior Championships
2nd UCI World Junior Championships
2nd National Junior Championships
2020–2021
1st UEC European Under-23 Championships
2021–2022
1st UCI World Under-23 Championships
2nd UEC European Under-23 Championships
3rd Overall UCI World Cup

1st Under-23 classification
2nd Overijse
2nd Tábor
2nd Hulst
2nd Flamanville
3rd Namur
3rd Hoogerheide
4th Zonhoven
5th Iowa City
5th Fayetteville
5th Besançon
5th Rucphen

Ethias Cross

3rd Bredene

3rd National Under-23 Championships
2022–2023
1st UEC European Under-23 Championships
1st National Championships
1st Oisterwijk
2nd Overall UCI World Cup

1st Overijse
1st Hulst
1st Val di Sole
1st Besançon
2nd Tábor
2nd Maasmechelen
2nd Antwerpen
2nd Dublin
2nd Zonhoven
2nd Benidorm
3rd Beekse Bergen
3rd Gavere

Superprestige

1st Diegem

X²O Badkamers Trophy

1st Herentals

2nd UCI World Championships
3rd Woerden
2023–2024
2nd Overall UCI World Cup

1st Gavere
1st Hulst
1st Zonhoven
2nd Waterloo
2nd Namur
2nd Troyes
2nd Benidorm
3rd Val di Sole
3rd Antwerpen

Superprestige

1st Diegem
2nd Boom

2nd National Championships
3rd UCI World Championships
X²O Badkamers Trophy

3rd Kortrijk

2024–2025
1st National Championships
X²O Badkamers Trophy

1st Koksijde
3rd Baal

UCI World Cup

2nd Dendermonde
3rd Namur
3rd Hulst
3rd Gavere
3rd Hoogerheide
4th Maasmechelen
5th Zonhoven

3rd UCI World Championships
2025–2026
UCI World Cup

1st Maasmechelen
1st Hoogerheide
2nd Dendermonde
3rd Gavere
3rd Zonhoven
4th Namur
4th Antwerpen
5th Koksijde

Superprestige

1st Diegem

2nd National Championships
X²O Badkamers Trophy

2nd Baal

3rd UCI World Championships

==== UCI World Cup results ====
Season	1	2	3	4	5	6	7	8	9	10	11	12	13	14	15	16	Rank	Points
2018–2019	WAT —	IOW —	BER —	TAB —	KOK —	NAM; 32	ZOL; 27	PON —	HOO; 24								47	70
2019–2020	IOW —	WAT —	BER; 30	TAB; 9	KOK; 20	NAM; 22	ZOL; 13	NOM —	HOO; 16								24	198
2020–2021	WAT; NH	DUB; NH	ZON; NH	KOK; NH	BES; NH	TAB; 6	ANT; NH	NAM; 11	DIE; NH	DEN; 23	HUL; 7	VIL; NH	HOO; NH	OVE; 17			9	66
2021–2022	WAT; 8	FAY; 5	IOW; 5	ZON; 4	OVE; 2	TAB; 2	KOK; 7	ANT —	BES; 5	VAL; 9	RUC; 5	NAM; 3	DEN; 6	HUL; 2	FLA; 2	HOO; 3	3	350
2022–2023	WAT —	FAY —	TAB; 2	MAA; 2	BER; 3	OVE; 1	HUL; 1	ANT; 2	DUB; 2	VAL; 1	GAV; 3	ZON; 2	BEN; 2	BES; 1			2	390
2023–2024	WAT; 2	MAA —	DEN —	TRO; 2	DUB —	FLA —	VAL; 3	NAM; 2	ANT; 3	GAV; 1	HUL; 1	ZON; 1	BEN; 2	HOO; 8			2	308
2024–2025	ANT —	DUB —	CAB; NH	NAM; 3	HUL; 3	ZON; 5	GAV; 3	BES —	DEN; 2	BEN —	MAA; 4	HOO; 3					8	173
2025–2026	TAB —	FLA —	TER —	NAM; 4	ANT; 4	KOK; 5	GAV; 3	DEN; 2	ZON; 3	BEN —	MAA; 1	HOO; 1					5	225

=== Mountain bike ===
2019
5th Cross-country, UEC European Junior Championships
2020
1st Cross-country, National Junior Championships
3rd Cross-country, UEC European Junior Championships
2021
3 Nations Cup

1st Wijster
1st Spaarnwoude
2nd Beringen

2nd Cross-country, UEC European Under-23 Championships
2022
1st Cross-country, UEC European Under-23 Championships
UCI Under-23 XCO World Cup

1st Leogang
2nd Albstadt
2nd Nové Město
3rd Lenzerheide

3 Nations Cup

1st Houffalize
2nd Wijster

2nd Cross-country, UCI World Under-23 Championships
2nd Cross-country, National Under-23 Championships
International MTB Bundesliga

2nd Heubach

2023
1st Cross-country, UEC European Championships
1st Cross-country, National Championships
1st Overall UCI XCO World Cup

1st Nové Město
1st Leogang
1st Val di Sole
2nd Les Gets
3rd Mont-Sainte-Anne

1st Overall UCI XCC World Cup

1st Les Gets
2nd Leogang
2nd Val di Sole
2nd Snowshoe
3rd Vallnord

3 Nations Cup

1st Wijster

2nd Short track, UCI World Championships
2024
1st Cross-country, UCI World Championships
UEC European Championships

1st Cross-country
2nd Short track

UCI XCO World Cup

1st Les Gets
2nd Val di Sole
3rd Crans-Montana
4th Nové Město

UCI XCC World Cup

1st Val di Sole
1st Crans-Montana
2nd Les Gets

1st Eupen
4th Cross-country, Olympic Games
2025
1st Short track, National Championships
UCI XCO World Cup

1st Leogang
1st Val di Sole

UCI XCC World Cup

1st Nové Město
1st Leogang
1st Val di Sole

International MTB Bundesliga

1st Heubach

2026
UCI XCC World Cup

1st Nové Město

4th Cross-country, UCI World Championships

==== UCI World Cup results ====
Season	1	2	3	4	5	6	7	8	9	10	Rank	Points
2023	NOV; 1	LEN; 5	LEO; 1	VAL; 1	AND; 7	LES; 2	SNO; 6	MON; 3			1	1939
2024	MAI —	ARA —	NOV; 4	VAL; 2	CRA; 3	LES; 1	LAK —	MON —			9	1023
2025	ARA —	ARA —	NOV; 13	LEO; 1	VAL; 1	AND; 10	LES; 10	LEN; DNF	LAK —	MON —	12	1115

=== Road ===
2023
5th Strade Bianche
2024 (1 pro win)
1st Road race, UCI World Under-23 Championships
Tour de France

1st Young rider classification
1st Stage 4
Held after Stages 4–5

3rd Ronde van Drenthe
3rd Trofeo Alfredo Binda
5th Dwars door Vlaanderen
6th Tour of Flanders
7th Gent–Wevelgem
8th Omloop Het Nieuwsblad
10th Omloop van het Hageland
2025 (1)
1st La Flèche Wallonne
2nd Liège–Bastogne–Liège
3rd Amstel Gold Race
4th Omloop Het Nieuwsblad
4th Omloop van het Hageland
4th Dwars door Vlaanderen
7th Strade Bianche
7th Trofeo Alfredo Binda
9th Tour of Flanders
10th Milan–San Remo
2026
1st Mountains classification, Tour de France
2nd Road race, UEC European Championships
2nd Liège–Bastogne–Liège
2nd La Flèche Wallonne
3rd Tour of Flanders
4th Milan–San Remo
5th Trofeo Oro in Euro
6th Road race, UCI World Championships
10th Amstel Gold Race

==== Classics results timeline ====
Monument	2023	2024	2025	2026
Milan–San Remo	Not held		10	4
Tour of Flanders	—	—	9	3
Paris–Roubaix	—	—	—	—
Liège–Bastogne–Liège	—	—	2	2
Classic	2023	2024	2025	2026
Omloop Het Nieuwsblad	—	8	4	—
Strade Bianche	5	13	7	6
Ronde van Drenthe	—	3	Not held	
Trofeo Alfredo Binda	—	3	7	12
Gent–Wevelgem	—	7	—	—
Dwars door Vlaanderen	—	5	—	17
Amstel Gold Race	—	—	3	10
La Flèche Wallonne	—	—	1	2
