= Giuseppe Loretz =

Italian cyclist

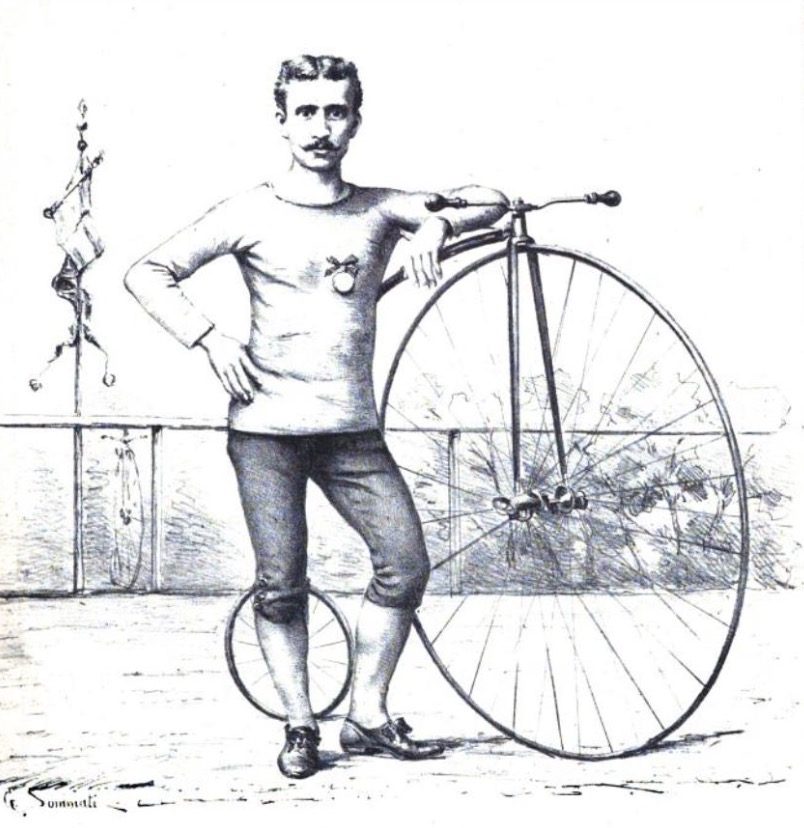

Personal information
- Full name: Giuseppe Loretz
- Born: 4 May 1860 Milan, Kingdom of Sardinia
- Died: 14 January 1944 (aged 83) Rubiana, Italy

Cycling career
- Sport: Cycling
- Discipline: Road
- Role: Rider

Major wins
- Road One-day races and Classics National Road Race Championships (1885) Milano–Pavia–Lodi–Milano (1881) Track Sprint, National Championships (1884)

Giuseppe Loretz (4 May 1860 – 14 January 1944) was an Italian cyclist. He was the first winner of the Italian National Road Race Championships in 1885, and finished second in 1886.

== Biography ==
Loretz was born in 1860. He trained as a land surveyor at the Royal Technical Institute of Milan. Loretz started riding in 1878. In 1882, he graduated from the institute with a diploma with distinction in 1882.

Loretz won a number of races between 1878 and 1883. In 1878, he won at Bergamo; in 1879, at Asti and Voghera. In 1880, he won at Lonigo and Pavia; in 1881 at Asti, Milan, Racconigi, and Alba. In 1882, he won at Brescia, and Cremona; in 1883, at Asti and Venaria Reale.

In 1884, Loretz also won a national race at Venaria Reale for which he was presented with a certificate, which was on display as part of the exhibiition for Giro d’Italia 2024.

In 1885, he won the Italian National Road Race Championships. For the win, he was presented with a bronze cup by Prince Amedeo of Savoy-Aosta.
