= Kim Jin-yeong (cyclist) =

South Korean cyclist

Personal information
- Born: 2 September 1970 (age 56)

Cycling career
- Sport: Cycling

- Kim Jin-yeong
- Hangul: 김진영
- Hanja: 金鎭榮
- RR: Gim Jinyeong
- MR: Kim Chinyŏng

Kim Jin-yeong (born 2 September 1970) is a South Korean former cyclist. She won a silver medal in the women's sprint event at the 1987 Asian Cycling Championships. She competed in the women's sprint event at the 1988 Summer Olympics. She was also part of the South Korean delegation at the 1990 Asian Games.
