= Zinaida Stahurskaya =

Belarusian cyclist (1971–2009)

- Stahurskaya as world champion in 2000

Personal information
- Full name: Zinaida Vladimirovna Stahurskaya
- Born: 9 February 1971 Vitebsk, Belarusian SSR, Soviet Union
- Died: 25 June 2009 (aged 38) Vitebsk, Belarus

Cycling career
- Sport: Cycling
- Discipline: Road
- Role: Rider

Professional teams
- 1999: Acca Due O
- 2000: SC Michela Fanini Record Rox
- 2001: Gas Sport Team
- 2002–2003: USC Chirio
- 2005: SS Lazio Ciclismo Team Ladispoli
- 2006: USC Chirio Forno d'Asolo
Medal record
Representing Belarus
Women's road cycling
World Championships
Gold medal – first place	2000 Plouay	Road race

Zinaida Vladimirovna Stahurskaya (original name: Зинаида Владимировна Стагурская; also written as Zinaida Stagurskaya, Zinaida Stahurskaia or Zinaida Stagourskaya; 9 February 1971 – 25 June 2009) was a Belarusian racing cyclist who was the world champion in 2000. Stahurskaya was born in Vitebsk. She rode at the 1992 Summer Olympics for the Unified Team and at the 1996 Summer Olympics and the 2004 Summer Olympics for Belarus.

== Doping ==
In 2006 Stahurskaya was banned for two years for a drugs test that she failed in 2005 at a number of European races. One positive test for the anabolic steroid stanozolol at the GP Carnevale Europa and twice for the hormone testosterone at the Giro di San Marino and Sparkassen Giro Bochum.

Stahurskaya had earlier been suspended for a positive test for a banned diuretic at the 2001 Giro d'Italia Femminile and a positive test for ephedrine at the 2003 Circuito di Massarosa. She was subsequently banned for four months and for two months respectively.

== Death ==
Stahurskaya died in 2009 after being struck by a car while training.

== Major results ==
1994
1st Overall Tour de Feminin-O cenu Českého Švýcarska
1st Overall GP Presov & Pravda
1st Stage 4 Essen Etappenfahrt
1st Stage 7 Tour du Finistère

1997
9th UCI Road World Championships – Women's time trial

1999
1st Stage 3 Giro d'Italia Femminile
2nd Tjejtrampet
6th Trofeo Alfredo Binda - Comune di Cittiglio

2000
1st UCI Road World Championships Road Race
1st Overall Giro della Toscana
1st Stage 11 Giro d'Italia Femminile
8th UCI Road World Championships – Women's time trial

2001
1st Overall Giro del Trentino Alto Adige - Südtirol
1st Stages 2a, 4 & 9 Giro d'Italia Femminile
2nd Overall Giro della Toscana
2nd Overall Tour de Snowy
2nd GP Carnevale d'Europa

2002
2nd Overall Giro d'Italia Femminile

1st Stages 2 & 8

2nd Overall Giro della Toscana

1st Stage 2

2nd Trofeo Alfredo Binda - Comune di Cittiglio
3rd Overall Emakumeen Bira
3rd Overall Giro del Trentino Alto Adige - Südtirol

2003
1st Trofeo Riviera Della Versilia
1st Stage 2 Giro d'Italia Femminile

2004
2nd Overall Giro del Trentino Alto Adige - Südtirol

1st Stages 2 & 4

2005
1st Overall Tour Féminin en Limousin

1st Stages 1, 3 & 4

1st Overall Giro di San Marino

1st Stage 2

1st Cento
1st GP Città di Castenaso
3rd Trofeo Riviera Della Versilia

2008
2nd National Road Race Championships

== See also ==
- List of racing cyclists and pacemakers with a cycling-related death
