= 2025 La Flèche Wallonne Femmes =

Cycling race

2025 UCI Women's World Tour, race 13 of 27
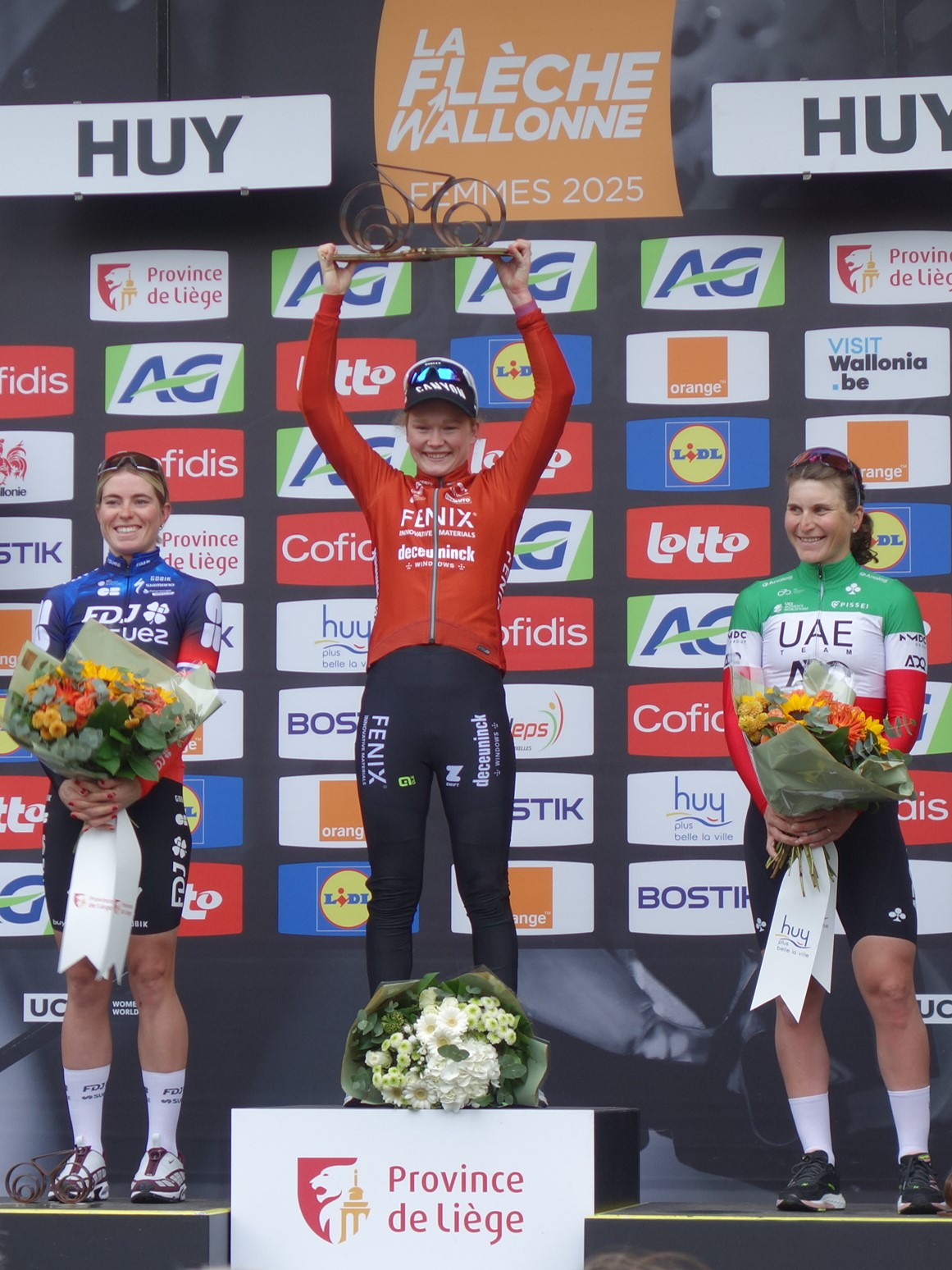
- Winner Puck Pieterse on the podium

Race details
- Dates: 23 April 2025
- Stages: 1
- Distance: 140.7 km (87.4 mi)

Results
	Winner	Puck Pieterse (NED)	(Fenix–Deceuninck)
	Second	Demi Vollering (NED)	(FDJ–Suez)
	Third	Elisa Longo Borghini (ITA)	(UAE Team ADQ)

The 2025 La Flèche Wallonne Femmes was a road cycling one-day race that took place on 23 April 2025 from the Belgian city of Huy. It was the 28th edition of La Flèche Wallonne Femmes and the 13th event of the 2025 UCI Women's World Tour.

The race was won by Dutch rider Puck Pieterse of Fenix–Deceuninck for the first time, after attacking on the final climb with 150 metres remaining.

== Course ==
The 140.7 kilometres (87.4 mi) course started and finished in Huy, with the finish line on the top of the final ascent of the Mur de Huy. The final half of the course was two laps of a 37.2 kilometres (23.1 mi) circuit (identical to the men's race), taking the ascents of Ereffe, Cherave and Huy twice.

The race featured 7 categorised climbs:

- 10 km: Côte de Bohissau
- 58 km: Côte de Petite Somme
- 85 km: Côte d'Ereffe – 2.1 km climb at 5%
- 98 km: Côte de Cherave – 1.3 km climb at 8%
- 103 km: Mur de Huy – 1.3 km climb at 9.6%
- 122 km: Côte d'Ereffe – 2.1 km climb at 5%
- 135 km: Côte de Cherave – 1.3 km climb at 8%
- 140 km: Mur de Huy – 1.3 km climb at 9.6%

== Teams ==
Twenty-four teams took part in the race.

UCI Women's WorldTeams

- AG Insurance–Soudal
- Canyon//SRAM zondacrypto
- Ceratizit Pro Cycling
- FDJ–Suez
- Fenix–Deceuninck
- Lidl–Trek
- Liv AlUla Jayco
- Movistar Team
- Roland
- Team Picnic–PostNL
- Team SD Worx–Protime
- UAE Team ADQ
- Uno-X Mobility
- Visma–Lease a Bike

UCI Women's ProTeams

- Arkéa–B&B Hotels Women
- Cofidis
- EF Education–Oatly
- Laboral Kutxa–Fundación Euskadi
- St. Michel–Preference Home–Auber93
- VolkerWessels Cycling Team
- Winspace Orange Seal

UCI Women's Continental Teams

- DD Group Pro Cycling Team
- Lotto Ladies
- Team Coop–Repsol

== Result ==
Result
Rank	Rider	Team	Time
1	Puck Pieterse (NED)	Fenix–Deceuninck	3h 53' 25"
2	Demi Vollering (NED)	FDJ–Suez	+ 2"
3	Elisa Longo Borghini (ITA)	UAE Team ADQ	+ 6"
4	Katarzyna Niewiadoma (POL)	Canyon//SRAM zondacrypto	+ 6"
5	Liane Lippert (GER)	Movistar Team	+ 11"
6	Kimberley Le Court (MRI)	AG Insurance–Soudal	+ 14"
7	Juliette Labous (FRA)	FDJ–Suez	+ 14"
8	Nienke Vinke (NED)	Team Picnic–PostNL	+ 14"
9	Niamh Fisher-Black (NZL)	Lidl–Trek	+ 20"
10	Mijntje Geurts (NED)	Visma–Lease a Bike	+ 20"
