= Rossella Galbiati =

Italian racing cyclist (born 1958)

Rosa Rossella Galbiati (born 11 October 1958) is an Italian former racing cyclist.

Galbiati was born on 11 October 1958 in Milan.

She won the Italian National Road Race Championships in 1978, and came second in 1980 and 1981.
