= Giro di San Marino =

Race details
- Region: San Marino
- Discipline: Road Race
- Competition: UCI 2.2 (2005); UCI 2.1 (2006–2007)
- Type: Stage race

History
- First edition: 2005
- Editions: 3
- Final edition: 2007
- First winner: Zinaida Stahurskaya (BLR)
- Most wins: No repeat winners
- Final winner: Marianne Vos (NED)

The Giro di San Marino was an event on the women's elite cycle racing calendar.

== Winners ==
Year	Country	Rider	Team
2005	Belarus	Zinaida Stahurskaya	
2006	Russia	Svetlana Bubnenkova	
2007	Netherlands	Marianne Vos	
