= Zhou Suying =

Chinese cyclist

Personal information
- Born: 8 December 1960 (age 65)

Cycling career
- Sport: Cycling

Zhou Suying (born 8 December 1960) is a Chinese former cyclist. She competed in the women's sprint event at the 1988 Summer Olympics.
