= Luisa Seghezzi =

Italian cyclist

Personal information
- Full name: Luisa Seghezzi
- Born: 6 December 1965 (age 60) Bergamo, Italy
- Height: 1.53 m (5 ft 0 in)
- Weight: 51 kg (112 lb; 8 st 0 lb)

Cycling career
- Sport: Cycling
- Discipline: Road
Medal record
Representing Italy
Women's road cycling
World Championships
Bronze medal – third place	1990 Utsunomiya	Road race

Luisa Seghezzi (born 6 December 1965) is an Italian former cyclist. She competed in the women's road race event at the 1984 Summer Olympics.

== Major results ==
1984
9th Olympic Road race
1987
8th UCI World Championship Road race
1988
10th Overall Tour de France féminin
1990
3rd UCI World Championship Road race
