= Maglia tricolore =

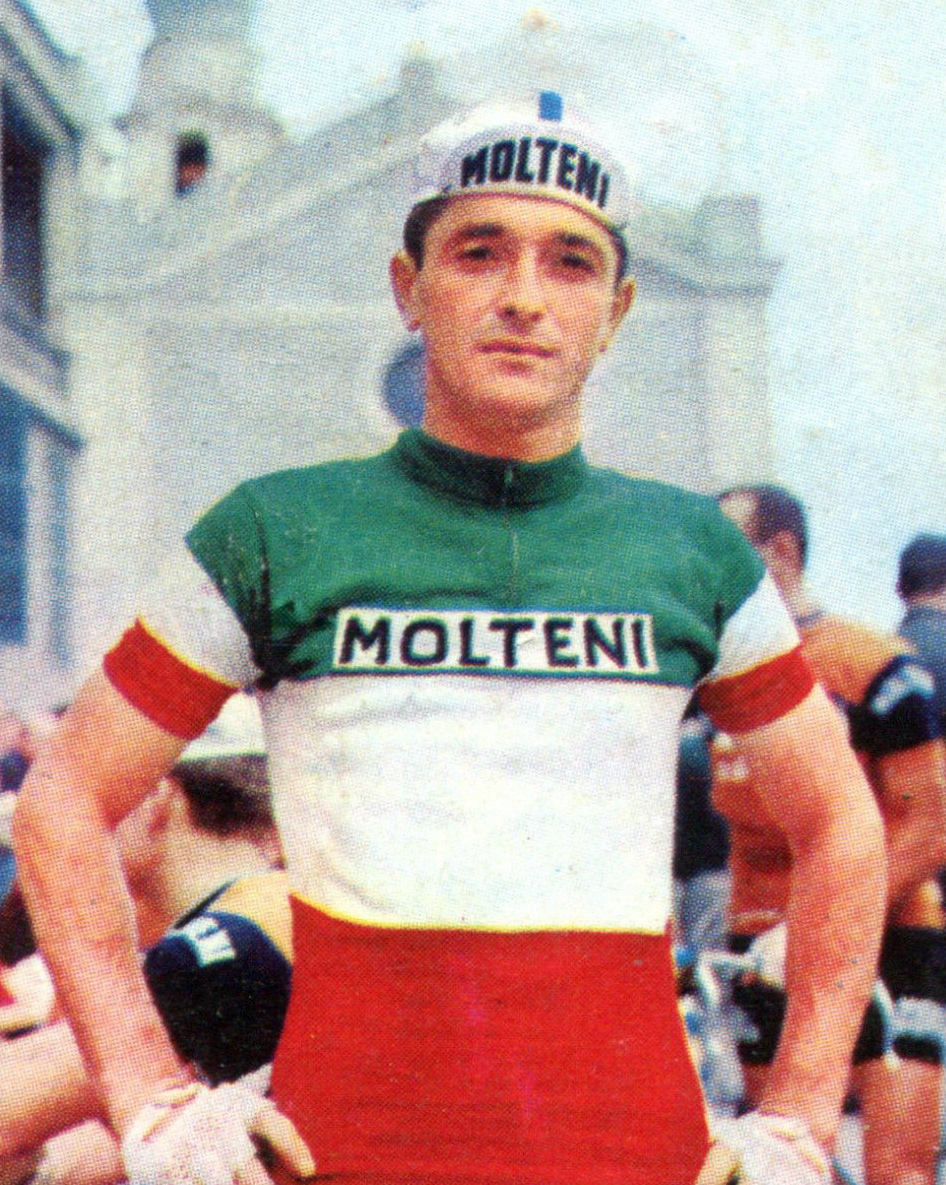
Michele Dancelli with the tri-colour jersey in 1966

The Maglia tricolore (tri-colour jersey) is the distinctive jersey worn by the "Champion of Italy" in a particular discipline of cycling. The mesh is composed of three horizontal coloured bands around the chest. From top to bottom the colours are: green, white and red.

Other popular jerseys are the distinctive yellow jersey, worn by the leader of the Tour de France, the pink jersey, worn by the leader of the Giro d'Italia, and the red jersey worn by the leader of the Vuelta a España. These jerseys are worn but only during the relevant competition, while the national champion of a discipline wears the champion's jersey in all races in that discipline.
