= Yang Hsiu-chen =

Taiwanese cyclist

Personal information
- Full name: 楊 秀珍 (Pinyin: Yáng Xiù-zhēn)
- Born: 27 May 1968 (age 58)

Cycling career
- Sport: Cycling

Yang Hsiu-chen (born 27 May 1968) is a Taiwanese former cyclist. She competed in two events at the 1988 Summer Olympics.
