= Fabiana Luperini =

Italian cyclist

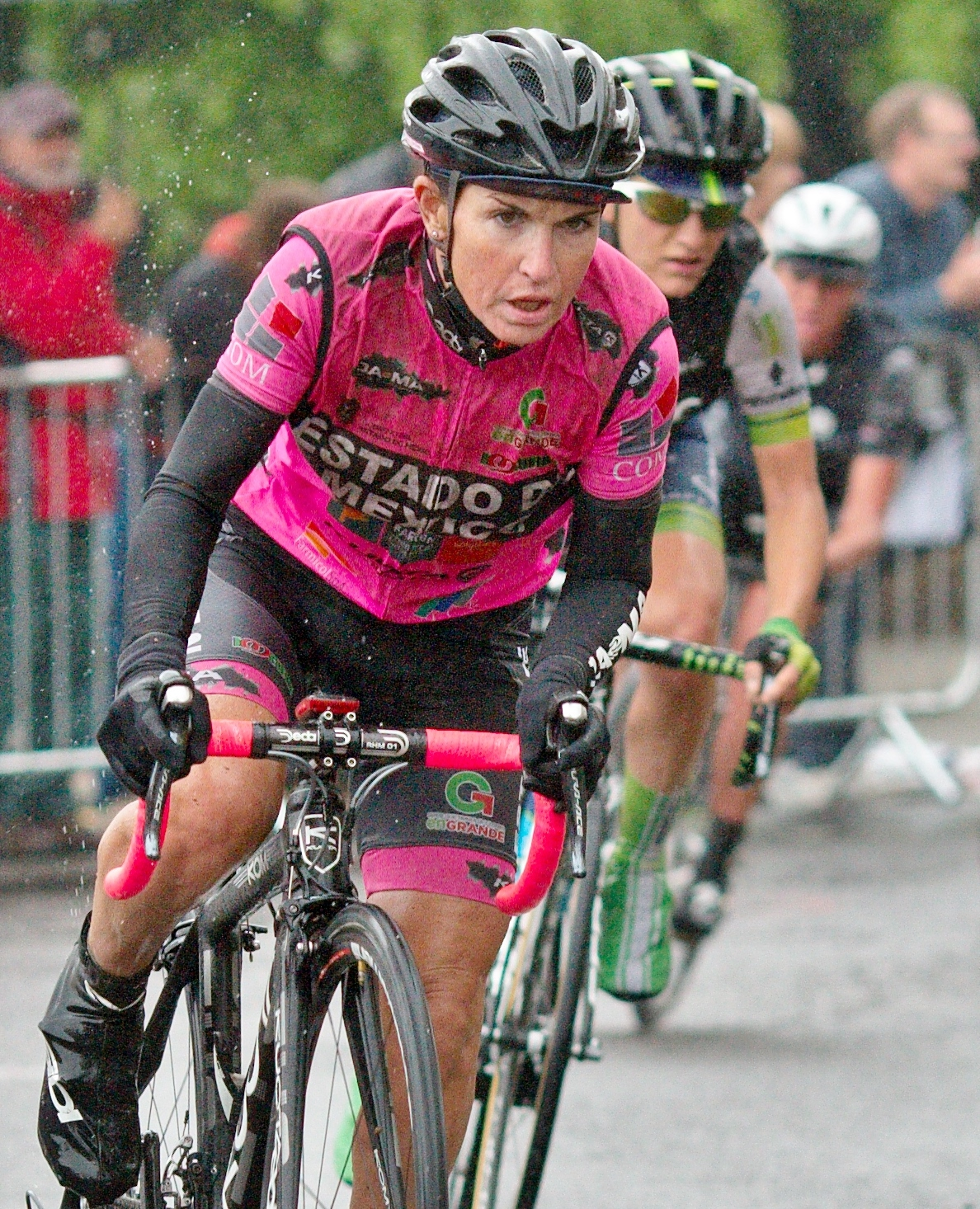
- Luperini during stage two of the Women's Tour 2014

Personal information
- Full name: Fabiana Luperini
- Nickname: Pantanina
- Born: 14 January 1974 (age 52) Pontedera, Italy

Cycling career
- Sport: Cycling
- Discipline: Road
- Role: Rider
- Rider type: Climber

Professional teams
- 2000: Gas Sport Team
- 2001–2002: Edil Savino
- 2003: Team 2002 Aurora RSM
- 2004: Team Let's Go
- 2005: A.S. Team FRW
- 2006: Top Girls Fassa Bortolo Raxy Line
- 2007–2009: Menikini - Selle Italia - Gysko
- 2011: MCipollini-Giambenini
- 2012: Faren-Honda
- 2013: Faren-Kuota

Major wins
- Grand Tours Giro d'Italia Femminile (1995, 1996, 1997, 1998, 2008) Tour Cycliste Féminin (1995, 1996, 1997) Stage races Giro del Trentino Alto Adige-Südtirol (1995, 1996, 1999, 2002, 2008) One day races & Classics National Road Race Champion (1996, 2004, 2006, 2008)

Fabiana Luperini (born 14 January 1974) is an Italian professional cyclist. She was born in Pontedera, Italy. Luperini has won the Giro d'Italia Femminile a record five times, with four consecutive victories in 1995–1998 and a fifth ten years later, in 2008. She has won the Grande Boucle Féminine Internationale three times consecutively, from 1995 to 1997. In 1998, she won the Tour de l'Aude Cycliste Féminin, and in 2006 she won the Iurreta-Emakumeen Bira. She retired at the end of the 2014 season.

== Major results ==
1993
1st Vertemate con Minoprio
1st Tour de Okinawa

1994
1st Trofeo Alfredo Binda-Comune di Cittiglio
1st Stages 3 & 4 Gracia–Orlová
3rd Overall Giro del Trentino Alto Adige-Südtirol

1995
1st Overall Giro d'Italia Femminile
1st Overall Grande Boucle Féminine Internationale
1st Overall Giro del Trentino Alto Adige-Südtirol
2nd Overall Giro della Toscana Int. Femminile

1996
1st National Road Race Championships
1st Overall Giro d'Italia Femminile
1st Overall Grande Boucle Féminine Internationale
1st Overall Giro del Trentino Alto Adige-Südtirol

1997
1st Overall Giro d'Italia Femminile
1st Overall Grande Boucle Féminine Internationale

1998
1st Overall Giro d'Italia Femminile
1st Overall Tour de l'Aude Cycliste Féminin
1st La Flèche Wallonne
2nd Overall Giro del Trentino Alto Adige-Südtirol
2nd Overall Grande Boucle Féminine Internationale

1999
1st Overall Giro del Trentino Alto Adige-Südtirol
2nd Overall Giro della Toscana Int. Femminile

2000
1st Trofeo Alfredo Binda-Comune di Cittiglio
2nd Overall Giro del Trentino Alto Adige-Südtirol
2nd Coupe du Monde Cycliste Féminine de Montréal
2nd Embrach
3rd Overall Giro della Toscana Int. Femminile

2001
1st La Flèche Wallonne
2nd Overall Giro del Trentino Alto Adige-Südtirol
2nd GP Suisse Féminin

2002
1st Overall Giro del Trentino Alto Adige-Südtirol
1st La Flèche Wallonne
2nd National Road Race Championships
3rd Brest - Pont-de-Buis

2003
1st Stage 6 Tour de l'Aude Cycliste Féminin

2004
1st National Road Race Championships
1st Tour de Berne
2nd Overall Giro d'Italia Femminile

1st Stage 5

3rd Overall Emakumeen Bira

2005
1st Stage 2 Gracia–Orlová
1st Stage 3a Emakumeen Bira
1st Stage 1 Giro di San Marino

2006
1st National Road Race Championships
1st Overall Emakumeen Bira

1st Stage 3a

1st Giro del Lago Maggiore
1st Gran Premio della Costa Etruschi
1st Giro del Friuli Donne

2007
1st Coupe du Monde Cycliste Féminine de Montréal
1st Stage 5 Tour de l'Aude Cycliste Féminin
2nd Overall Giro del Trentino Alto Adige-Südtirol

1st Stage 1

2nd Overall Tour de l'Ardèche

1st Stage 4 & 5

2008
1st National Road Race Championships
1st Overall Giro d'Italia Femminile

1st Stages 4 & 7

1st Overall Giro del Trentino Alto Adige-Südtirol

1st Stage 2

1st GP Varazze Citta Delle Donne
1st GP Ouest France

2009
1st Stage 6 Thüringen Rundfahrt der Frauen
2nd Overall Gracia–Orlová

1st Stage 2

2012
1st Stage 2a Giro del Trentino Alto Adige-Südtirol

=== Major Tour results timeline ===
Grand Tour general classification results timeline
| Grand Tour | 1993 | 1994 | 1995 | 1996 | 1997 | 1998 | 1999 | 2000 | 2001 | 2002 | 2003 | 2004 | 2005 | 2006 | 2007 | 2008 | 2009 | 2010 | 2011 | 2012 | 2013 | 2014 |
| Giro d'Italia Femminile | — | — | 1 | 1 | 1 | 1 | — | — | — | — | — | 2 | — | — | — | 1 | — | — | — | — | — | 16 |
| Tour Cycliste Féminin | — | — | 1 | 1 | 1 | — | — | — | — | — | — | — | — | — | — | — | — | Race cancelled | | | | |
Stage race results timeline
| Stage race | 1993 | 1994 | 1995 | 1996 | 1997 | 1998 | 1999 | 2000 | 2001 | 2002 | 2003 | 2004 | 2005 | 2006 | 2007 | 2008 | 2009 | 2010 | 2011 | 2012 | 2013 | 2014 |
| Grand Prix Elsy Jacobs | — | — | — | — | — | — | — | — | — | — | — | — | — | — | — | — | — | — | — | 31 | — | — |
| Emakumeen Euskal Bira | — | — | — | — | — | — | — | — | — | — | — | 2 | — | 1 | — | 6 | 6 | — | — | — | 9 | 7 |
| Giro del Trentino Alto Adige-Südtirol | — | 3 | 1 | 1 | — | 2 | 1 | 2 | 2 | 1 | — | — | — | — | 2 | 1 | 9 | — | 16 | 11 | — | — |
| Giro della Toscana Int. Femminile | — | — | 2 | — | — | — | 2 | 3 | — | — | — | — | — | — | — | — | 17 | — | 24 | 10 | DNF | 30 |
| The Women's Tour | Race did not exist | | | | | | | | | | | | | | | | | | | | | 57 |
| Thüringen Rundfahrt der Frauen | — | — | — | — | — | — | — | — | — | — | — | — | — | — | — | — | 15 | — | 10 | — | — | — |
| Boels Rental Ladies Tour | — | — | — | — | — | — | — | — | — | — | — | — | — | — | — | — | — | — | — | — | — | — |
