= Beth Tabor =

Canadian cyclist

Personal information
- Born: 21 February 1964 (age 62) Toronto, Ontario, Canada

Cycling career
- Sport: Cycling

Beth Tabor (born 21 February 1964) is a Canadian former cyclist. She competed in the women's sprint event at the 1988 Summer Olympics.
