= Emanuela Menuzzo =

Italian cyclist

Personal information
- Born: 1 August 1956 (age 70) Milan, Italy

Cycling career
- Sport: Cycling

Emanuela Menuzzo (born 1 August 1956) is an Italian former cyclist. She competed in the women's road race event at the 1984 Summer Olympics.
