= Imelda Chiappa =

Italian cyclist (born 1966)

Personal information
- Full name: Imelda Chiappa
- Born: 10 May 1966 (age 60) Sotto il Monte, Italy
- Height: 1.68 m (5 ft 6 in)
- Weight: 60 kg (132 lb)

Cycling career
- Sport: Cycling
- Current team: Retired

Major wins
- (silver) Summer Olympics (1996); National Road Champion (1993, 1997); National Time Trial Champion (1995)

Imelda Chiappa (born 10 May 1966) is a retired female racing cyclist from Italy. She represented her native country at two Summer Olympics: 1988 and 1996. Her most significant achievement was winning the silver medal in the women's individual road race at the 1996 Summer Olympics in Atlanta, Georgia.

== Major results ==
1994
9th UCI Road World Championships – Women's time trial
