= Elisabetta Fanton =

Italian cyclist

Personal information
- Born: 26 December 1968 (age 57) Treviso, Italy

Cycling career
- Sport: Cycling

Elisabetta Fanton (born 26 December 1968) is an Italian former cyclist. She competed in the women's sprint event at the 1988 Summer Olympics.
