= Valeria Cappellotto =

Italian racing cyclist

Personal information
- Full name: Valeria Cappellotto
- Born: 28 January 1970 Noventa Vicentina, Italy
- Died: 17 September 2015 (aged 45) Marano Vicentino, Italy
- Height: 1.62 m (5 ft 4 in)
- Weight: 48 kg (106 lb)

Cycling career
- Sport: Cycling

Major wins
- National Road Champion (1999)

Valeria Cappellotto (28 January 1970 – 17 September 2015) was an Italian racing cyclist. She represented her native country at two Summer Olympics: 1992 and 2000. Alessandra Cappellotto was her sister.

Cappellotto died on the morning of 17 September 2015 in Marano Vicentino from an incurable illness at the age of 45.
