= Alessandra Cappellotto =

Italian cyclist

Personal information
- Full name: Alessandra Cappellotto
- Born: 27 August 1968 (age 58) Sarcedo, Italy
- Height: 1.73 m (5 ft 8 in)
- Weight: 60 kg (132 lb)

Cycling career
- Sport: Cycling

Professional teams
- 1999–2001: Gas Sport Team
- 2002: Power Plate-Bik
- 2004: USC Chirio Forno d'Asolo

Major wins
- Road World Champion (1997); National Road Champion (2003)

Alessandra Cappellotto (born 27 August 1968) is a retired racing cyclist from Italy. She represented her native country at two consecutive Summer Olympics: 1996, and 2000. She won the world title in the women's individual road race at the 1997 UCI Road World Championships in San Sebastian, Spain. Valeria Cappellotto, who died in 2015, was her sister.

She helped five Afghan cyclists to escape their country and settle in Italy, following the 2021 Taliban offensive.

== Major results ==
1996
3rd UCI Road World Championships – Women's time trial
1997
10th UCI Road World Championships – Women's time trial
