= 2004 UCI Road World Championships – Women's road race =

Women's Individual Road Race
2004 UCI Road World Championships
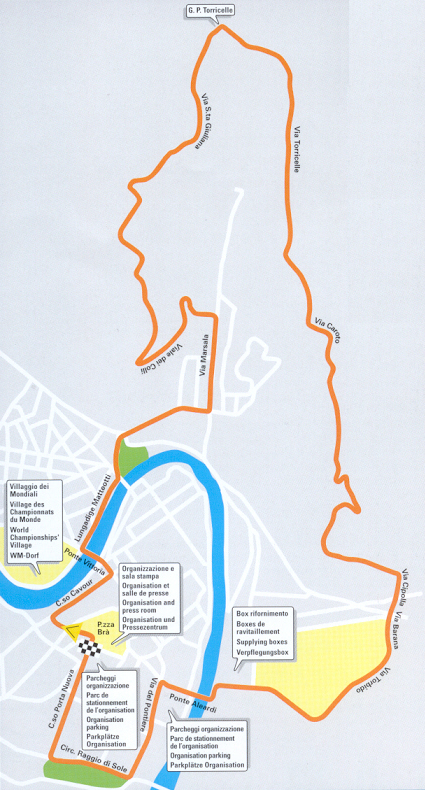

Race details
- Dates: 2004-10-02
- Stages: 1 in (Italy) Verona (ITA)
- Distance: 132.75 km (82.49 mi)
- Winning time: 03h 44' 38"

Results
	Winner	(Germany) Judith Arndt (GER)
	Second	(Italy) Tatiana Guderzo (ITA)
	Third	(Norway) Anita Valen (NOR)

The women's road race of the 2004 UCI Road World Championships cycling event took place on 2 October in Verona, Italy. Starting at 13:30 CEST, the race was 132.75 km long, which constituted of 9 laps of a circuit around Torricelle, including the 3.4 km Torricelle climb, with an average gradient of approximately 4%, 7% at the steepest point. The course was almost identical to the one used for the 1999 UCI Road World Championships when Edita Pučinskaitė won the women's championship.

The race was won by the German rider Judith Arndt.

== Final classification ==
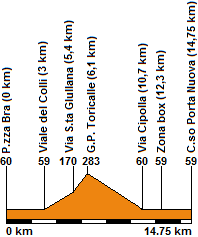
Race profile of the 14.75 km long circuit

Rank	Rider	Time
1st place, gold medalist(s)	Judith Arndt (GER)	03h 44'38"
2nd place, silver medalist(s)	Tatiana Guderzo (ITA)	at 10"
3rd place, bronze medalist(s)	Anita Valen (NOR)	at 12"
4	Trixi Worrack (GER)	s.t.
5	Modesta Vžesniauskaitė (LTU)	s.t.
6	Nicole Brändli (SUI)	s.t.
7	Joane Somarriba (ESP)	s.t.
8	Svetlana Bubnenkova (RUS)	s.t.
9	Mirjam Melchers (NED)	s.t.
10	Edita Pučinskaitė (LTU)	s.t.
11	Valentina Polkhanova (RUS)	s.t.
12	Zoulfia Zabirova (RUS)	s.t.
13	Oenone Wood (AUS)	at 41"
14	Lyne Bessette (CAN)	s.t.
15	Eneritz Iturriaga (ESP)	s.t.
16	Deirdre Demet-Barry (USA)	s.t.
17	Rasa Polikevičiūtė (LTU)	s.t.
18	Susan Palmer-Komar (CAN)	s.t.
19	Jolanta Polikevičiūtė (LTU)	s.t.
20	Christine Thorburn (USA)	s.t.
21	Jeannie Longo-Ciprelli (FRA)	at 1'07"
22	Annette Beutler (SUI)	s.t.
23	Edwige Pitel (FRA)	s.t.
24	Nicole Cooke (GBR)	s.t.
25	Linda Villumsen Serup (DEN)	s.t.
26	Susanne Ljungskog (SWE)	at 1'11"
27	Noemi Cantele (ITA)	at 2'08"
28	Lene Byberg (NOR)	at 2'36"
29	Magali Le Floc'h (FRA)	at 3'30"
30	Chantal Beltman (NED)	s.t.
31	Theresa Senff (GER)	at 3'38"
32	Barbara Heeb (SUI)	s.t.
33	Lada Kozlíková (CZE)	at 6'09"
34	Amy Moore (CAN)	s.t.
35	Miho Oki (JPN)	s.t.
36	Bogumiła Matusiak (POL)	s.t.
37	Rachel Heal (GBR)	s.t.
38	Clemilda Fernandes (BRA)	s.t.
39	Christiane Soeder (AUT)	s.t.
40	Evy Van Damme (BEL)	s.t.
41	Tatiana Shishkova (MDA)	s.t.
42	Anna Zugno (ITA)	s.t.
43	Corine Hierckens (BEL)	s.t.
44	Elisabeth Brunel (FRA)	s.t.
45	Trine Hansen (DEN)	s.t.
46	Amber Neben (USA)	s.t.
47	Zinaida Stahurskaya (BLR)	s.t.
48	Sarah Grab (SUI)	s.t.
49	Margaret Hemsley (AUS)	s.t.
50	Kimberly Bruckner (USA)	s.t.
51	Manon Jutras (CAN)	s.t.
52	Maribel Moreno (ESP)	s.t.
53	Sonia Huguet (FRA)	s.t.
54	Erinne Willock (CAN)	s.t.
55	Dori Ruano (ESP)	s.t.
56	Elsbeth Vink (NED)	s.t.
57	Olivia Gollan (AUS)	s.t.
58	Tina Liebig (GER)	at 6'13"
59	Kristin Armstrong (USA)	at 11'12"
60	Ghita Beltman (NED)	s.t.
61	Malgorzata Wysocka (POL)	at 11'23"
62	Rosane Kirch (BRA)	s.t.
63	Natalya Kachalka (UKR)	s.t.
64	Veerle Ingels (BEL)	at 12'14"
65	Oxana Kashchyshyna (UKR)	at 20'52"
66	Grete Treier (EST)	at 21'21"
67	Valentina Karpenko (UKR)	s.t.
68	Tina Pic (USA)	at 21'23"
69	Camilla Larsson (SWE)	at 22'51"
70	Natalia Boyarskaya (RUS)	s.t.
71	Lise Christensen (DEN)	s.t.
72	Marina Jaunâtre (FRA)	s.t.
73	Andrea Graus (AUT)	s.t.
74	Ana Madrínan (COL)	at 23'32"
75	Paulina Brzeźna (POL)	at 28'08"
DID NOT FINISH
	Madeleine Sandig (GER)	
Daniela Fusar Poli (ITA)
Silvia Parietti (ITA)
Hayley Rutherford (AUS)
Sofie Goor (BEL)
Veronika Jeger (HUN)
Arenda Grimberg (NED)
Edita Kubelskienė (LTU)
Zita Urbonaitė (LTU)
Olga Slyusareva (RUS)
Regina Schleicher (GER)
Tania Belvederesi (ITA)
Nathalie Bates (AUS)
Sereina Trachsel (SUI)
Iona Wynter (JAM)
Noelia Fernández (ARG)
Charlotte Goldsmith (GBR)
Frances Newstead (GBR)
Julia Martissova (RUS)
Aleksandra Zabrocka (POL)
Nicole Demars (CAN)
Cristina Alcalde (ESP)
Anna Ramírez Bauxel (ESP)
Irene Hostettler (SUI)
Verónica Leal (MEX)
Volha Hayeva (BLR)
Tatsiana Sharakova (BLR)
Tiina Nieminen (FIN)
Colette Swift (IRL)
Madeleine Lindberg (SWE)
Loes Gunnewijk (NED)
Alison Wright (AUS)
Iryna Chuzhynova (UKR)
Louise Moriarty (IRL)
Uenia Fernandes (BRA)
Cindy Pieters (BEL)
Sharon Vandromme (BEL)
Maria Silva (BRA)
Mónika Király (HUN)
Monica Holler (SWE)
Linn Torp (NOR)
Janildes Fernandes (BRA)
Dianne Emery (RSA)
