= 2009 Ster Zeeuwsche Eilanden =

2009 Rabo Ster Zeeuwsche Eilanden
Race details
- Dates: 18–20 June 2009
- Stages: 3
- Winning time: 6h 26' 54"

Results
Jersey awarded to the overall winner	Winner	Ina-Yoko Teutenberg (GER)	(Team Columbia–HTC Women)
	Second	Chantal Beltman (NED)	(Team Columbia–HTC Women)
	Third	Linda Villumsen (NZL)	(Team Columbia–HTC Women)

The 2009 Rabo Ster Zeeuwsche Eilanden was the 12th edition of the Ster Zeeuwsche Eilanden, a women's cycling stage race in the Netherlands. It was part of the 2009 women's road cycling season. It was rated by the UCI as a category 2.2 race and was held between 20 and 22 June 2009.

== Stages ==
=== Stage 1 ===
18 June – Vlissingen to Vlissingen, 7.1 km (4.4 mi) (Individual time trial)

Stage 1 result

Result
Rank	Rider	Team	Time
1	Linda Villumsen (NZL)	Team Columbia–HTC Women	9m 05.45s
2	Loes Gunnewijk (NED)	Team Flexpoint	+ 05.56s
3	Charlotte Becker (GER)	Equipe Nürnberger Versicherung	+ 09.28s
4	Ina-Yoko Teutenberg (GER)	Team Columbia–HTC Women	+ 09.56s
5	Chantal Beltman (NED)	Team Columbia–HTC Women	+ 10.09s
6	Mirjam Melchers-van Poppel (NED)	Team Flexpoint	+ 10.41s
7	Ellen van Dijk (NED)	Team Columbia–HTC Women	+ 12.06s
8	Iris Slappendel (NED)	Team Flexpoint	+ 15.96s
9	Liesbet De Vocht (BEL)	DSB Bank - Nederland bloeit	+ 21.00s
10	Nikki Harris (GBR)	Team Flexpoint	+ 22.68s

General Classification after Stage 1

Result
Rank	Rider	Team	Time
1	Linda Villumsen (NZL)	Team Columbia–HTC Women	9' 05"
2	Loes Gunnewijk (NED)	Team Flexpoint	+ 6"
3	Charlotte Becker (GER)	Equipe Nürnberger Versicherung	+ 9"
4	Ina-Yoko Teutenberg (GER)	Team Columbia–HTC Women	+ 10"
5	Chantal Beltman (NED)	Team Columbia–HTC Women	+ 10"
6	Mirjam Melchers-van Poppel (NED)	Team Flexpoint	+ 10"
7	Ellen van Dijk (NED)	Team Columbia–HTC Women	+ 12"
8	Iris Slappendel (NED)	Team Flexpoint	+ 16"
9	Liesbet De Vocht (BEL)	DSB Bank - Nederland bloeit	+ 21"
10	Nikki Harris (GBR)	Team Flexpoint	+ 23"

=== Stage 2 ===
19 June – Middelburg to Vlissingen, 113.9 km (70.8 mi)

Stage 2 result

Result
Rank	Rider	Team	Time
1	Suzanne de Goede (NED)	Equipe Nürnberger Versicherung	2h 53m 58s
2	Ina-Yoko Teutenberg (GER)	Team Columbia–HTC Women	s.t.
3	Chloe Hosking (AUS)	Movingladies–WeijersHako	s.t.
4	Loes Gunnewijk (NED)	Team Flexpoint	s.t.
5	Monique van de Ree (NED)	Leontien.nl	s.t.
6	Liesbet De Vocht (BEL)	DSB Bank - Nederland bloeit	s.t.
7	Lizzie Armitstead (GBR)	Lotto–Belisol Ladiesteam	s.t.
8	Charlotte Becker (GER)	Equipe Nürnberger Versicherung	s.t.
9	Loes Markerink (NED)	Team Flexpoint	s.t.
10	Emma Mackie (AUS)	Lotto–Belisol Ladiesteam	s.t.

General Classification after Stage 2

Result
Rank	Rider	Team	Time
1	Ina-Yoko Teutenberg (GER)	Team Columbia–HTC Women	3h 03m 02s
2	Linda Villumsen (NZL)	Team Columbia–HTC Women	+ 1s
3	Loes Gunnewijk (NED)	Team Flexpoint	+ 6s
4	Charlotte Becker (GER)	Equipe Nürnberger Versicherung	+ 7s
5	Chantal Beltman (NED)	Team Columbia–HTC Women	+ 9s
6	Mirjam Melchers-van Poppel (NED)	Team Flexpoint	+ 11s
7	Ellen van Dijk (NED)	Team Columbia–HTC Women	+ 13s
8	Iris Slappendel (NED)	Team Flexpoint	+ 17s
9	Suzanne de Goede (NED)	Equipe Nürnberger Versicherung	+ 21s
10	Liesbet De Vocht (BEL)	DSB Bank - Nederland bloeit	+ 22s

=== Stage 3 ===
20 June – Westkapelle to Westkapelle, 134.7 km (83.7 mi)

Stage 3 result

Result
Rank	Rider	Team
1	Andrea Bosman (NED)	
2	Nikki Harris (GBR)	Team Flexpoint
3	Chantal Beltman (NED)	Team Columbia–HTC Women
4	Vera Koedooder (NED)	Lotto–Belisol Ladiesteam
5	Liesbet De Vocht (BEL)	DSB Bank - Nederland bloeit
6	Ina-Yoko Teutenberg (GER)	Team Columbia–HTC Women
7	Suzanne de Goede (NED)	Equipe Nürnberger Versicherung
8	Loes Gunnewijk (NED)	Team Flexpoint
9	Linda Villumsen (NZL)	Team Columbia–HTC Women
10	Charlotte Becker (GER)	Equipe Nürnberger Versicherung

General Classification after Stage 3

Result
Rank	Rider	Team	Time
1	Ina-Yoko Teutenberg (GER)	Team Columbia–HTC Women	6h 26m 54s
2	Chantal Beltman (NED)	Team Columbia–HTC Women	+ 03s
3	Linda Villumsen (NZL)	Team Columbia–HTC Women	+ 11s
4	Loes Gunnewijk (NED)	Team Flexpoint	+ 13s
5	Nikki Harris (GBR)	Team Flexpoint	+ 16s
6	Charlotte Becker (GER)	Equipe Nürnberger Versicherung	+ 18s
7	Liesbet De Vocht (BEL)	DSB Bank - Nederland bloeit	+ 26s
8	Vera Koedooder (NED)	Lotto–Belisol Ladiesteam	+ 26s
9	Mirjam Melchers-van Poppel (NED)	Team Flexpoint	+ 30s
10	Suzanne de Goede (NED)	Equipe Nürnberger Versicherung	+ 32s

== General classification ==
Result
Rank	Rider	Team	Time
1	Ina-Yoko Teutenberg (GER)	Team Columbia–HTC Women	6h 26m 54s
2	Chantal Beltman (NED)	Team Columbia–HTC Women	+ 03s
3	Linda Villumsen (NZL)	Team Columbia–HTC Women	+ 11s
4	Loes Gunnewijk (NED)	Team Flexpoint	+ 13s
5	Nikki Harris (GBR)	Team Flexpoint	+ 16s
6	Charlotte Becker (GER)	Equipe Nürnberger Versicherung	+ 18s
7	Liesbet De Vocht (BEL)	DSB Bank - Nederland bloeit	+ 26s
8	Vera Koedooder (NED)	Lotto–Belisol Ladiesteam	+ 26s
9	Mirjam Melchers-van Poppel (NED)	Team Flexpoint	+ 30s
10	Suzanne de Goede (NED)	Equipe Nürnberger Versicherung	+ 32s

== See also ==
- 2009 in women's road cycling
