= Cycling at the 2006 Commonwealth Games – Women's road race =

Cycling – Women's road race at the 2006 Commonwealth Games
- Venue: Royal Botanic Gardens
- Location: Melbourne, Australia
- Date: 26 March 2006
- Competitors: 30 from 10 nations
- Winning time: 2:56:08

Medalists
| gold medal | Natalie Bates | Australia |
| silver medal | Oenone Wood | Australia |
| bronze medal | Nicole Cooke | Wales |

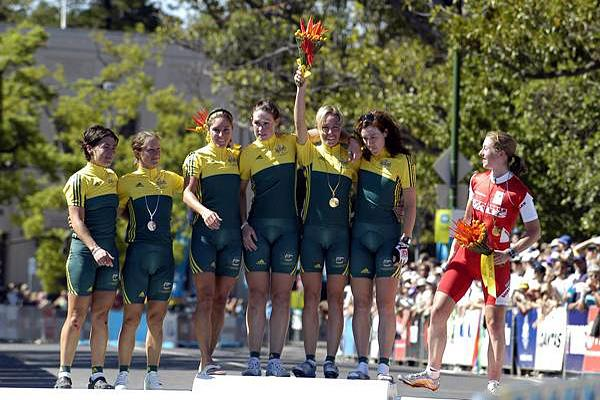
Australia celebrate winning the gold and silver medals

The women's cycling road race was one of the road cycling events at the 2006 Commonwealth Games and took place on 26 March 2006 in Melbourne, Australia, on a route through the Royal Botanic Gardens.

The course was 11.1 kilometres (6.9 mi), with nine laps raced. The total race length was 100 kilometres (62 mi). Natalie Bates from Australia won the gold medal in the race, with Oenone Wood winning the silver medal. Reigning champion Nicole Cooke, who was the only Welsh cyclist in the race, won the bronze medal.

Melissa Holt from New Zealand was the only cyclist who did not finish the race due to an injury. During the sixth lap of the race, Holt crashed into Olivia Gollan. Gollan, who lost concentration, clipped Nicole Cooke's wheel, and hit the tarmac, with Holt ploughing into Gollan and going over the handlebars. Holt was taken to the hospital with a collarbone fracture.

== Results ==
The notation "s.t." indicates that the rider crossed the finish line in the same group as the one receiving the time above her, and was therefore credited with the same finishing time. The notation "DNF" indicates that the rider did not finish the race.

| Rank | Rider | Time |
|---|---|---|
| 1st place, gold medalist(s) | Natalie Bates (AUS) | 2:56:08 |
| 2nd place, silver medalist(s) | Oenone Wood (AUS) | 2:59:13 |
| 3rd place, bronze medalist(s) | Nicole Cooke (WAL) | s.t. |
| 4 | Gina Grain (CAN) | s.t. |
| 5 | Rachel Heal (ENG) | s.t. |
| 6 | Joanne Kiesanowski (NZL) | 2:59:15 |
| 7 | Sara Carrigan (AUS) | 2:59:27 |
| 8 | Amy Hunt (ENG) | 2:59:29 |
| 9 | Olivia Gollan (AUS) | s.t. |
| 10 | Rochelle Gilmore (AUS) | 2:59:32 |
| 11 | Erinne Willock (CAN) | s.t. |
| 12 | Charlotte Goldsmith (ENG) | s.t. |
| 13 | Nikki Harris (ENG) | s.t. |
| 14 | Wendy Houvenaghel (ENG) | s.t. |
| 15 | Amy Moore (CAN) | s.t. |
| 16 | Toni Bradshaw (NZL) | 2:59:35 |
| 17 | Sarah Ulmer (NZL) | 2:59:39 |
| 18 | Katherine Bates (AUS) | s.t. |
| 19 | Susan Janne Palmer-Komar (CAN) | 3:00:09 |
| 20 | Noor Azian Binti Alias (MAS) | s.t. |
| 21 | Emma Jones (ENG) | 3:01:40 |
| 22 | Mandy Poitras (CAN) | 3:01:51 |
| 23 | Michelle Hyland (NZL) | 3:02:11 |
| 24 | Iona Parks (JAM) | 3:03:17 |
| 25 | Julia Lesley Hawley (BER) | 3:03:27 |
| 26 | Susie Wood (NZL) | s.t. |
| 27 | Audrey Lemieux (CAN) | 3:05:03 |
| 28 | Stephania Magri (MLT) | 3:09:28 |
| 29 | Norizan Binti Musa (MAS) | 3:11:50 |
| | Melissa Holt (NZL) | DNF |
