= 1999 UCI Road World Championships – Women's road race =

Women's Individual Road Race
1999 UCI Road World Championships
- Rainbow jersey

Race details
- Dates: 1999-10-09
- Stages: 1 in (Italy) Verona (ITA)
- Distance: 113.75 km (70.68 mi)
- Winning time: 02h 59' 49"

Results
	Winner	(Lithuania) Edita Pučinskaitė (LTU)
	Second	(Australia) Anna Wilson (AUS)
	Third	(Lithuania) Diana Žiliūtė (LTU)

The Women's Road Race at the 1999 UCI Road World Championships was held on Saturday October 9, 1999, in Verona, Italy, over a total distance of 113,75 kilometres (seven laps). There were a total of 119 starters, with 93 cyclists finishing the race.

== Final classification ==
Rank	Rider	Time
1st place, gold medalist(s)	Edita Pučinskaitė (LTU)	02:59:49
2nd place, silver medalist(s)	Anna Wilson (AUS)	+ 00.18
3rd place, bronze medalist(s)	Diana Žiliūtė (LTU)	—
4.	Tetyana Styazhkina (UKR)	—
5.	Valeria Cappellotto (ITA)	—
6.	Zulfiya Zabirova (RUS)	—
7.	Joane Somarriba (ESP)	—
8.	Daniela Veronesi (SMR)	—
9.	Jeannie Longo (FRA)	—
10.	Nicole Brändli (SUI)	—
11.	Géraldine Löwenguth (FRA)	—
12.	Rasa Polikevičiūtė (LTU)	—
13.	Lyne Bessette (CAN)	—
14.	Jolanta Polikevičiūtė (LTU)	+ 00.43
15.	Alessandra Cappellotto (ITA)	+ 01.28
16.	Susy Pryde (NZL)	+ 04.33
17.	Chantal Beltman (NED)	—
18.	Goulnara Ivanova (RUS)	—
19.	Alison Sydor (CAN)	—
20.	Heidi Van De Vijver (BEL)	—
21.	Elsbeth Vink (NED)	—
22.	Anke Erlank (RSA)	—
23.	Roberta Bonanomi (ITA)	—
24.	Susanne Ljungskog (SWE)	—
25.	Barbara Heeb (SUI)	—
26.	Elisabeth Brunel (FRA)	—
27.	Lenka Ilavská (SVK)	—
28.	Cindy Pieters (BEL)	—
29.	Annie Gariepy (CAN)	—
30.	Fátima Blázquez (ESP)	—
31.	Valentina Polkhanova (RUS)	—
32.	Yvonne Schnorf (SUI)	+ 06.46
33.	Karen Kurreck (USA)	—
34.	Tracey Gaudry (AUS)	—
35.	Valentyna Karpenko (UKR)	—
36.	Valentina Gerasimova (RUS)	—
37.	Leigh Hobson (CAN)	—
38.	Ragnhild Kostøl (NOR)	—
39.	Juanita Feldhahn (AUS)	—
40.	Bogumiła Matusiak (POL)	—
41.	Chantal Daucourt (SUI)	—
42.	Sigrid Corneo (ITA)	—
43.	Wenche Stensvold (NOR)	—
44.	Mirjam Melchers (NED)	—
45.	Kimberly Smith (USA)	—
46.	Fabiana Luperini (ITA)	—
47.	Oksana Saprykina (UKR)	+ 09.19
48.	Rosa María Bravo (ESP)	+ 12.50
49.	Svitlana Hihilyeva (UKR)	—
50.	Marie Höljer (SWE)	—
51.	Marion Brauen (SUI)	—
52.	Zinaida Stahurskaya (BLR)	—
53.	Miluse Flaskova (CZE)	—
54.	Solrun Flataas (NOR)	—
55.	Vanja Vonckx (BEL)	—
56.	Lucia Pizzolotto (ITA)	—
57.	Alexandra Koliasseva (RUS)	—
58.	Natalya Kishchuk (UKR)	—
59.	Zita Urbonaitė (LTU)	—
60.	Sanna Lehtimäki (FIN)	—
61.	Séverine Desbouys (FRA)	—
62.	Tina Liebig (GER)	+ 16.29
63.	Sara Symington (GBR)	+ 18.35
64.	Laurence Restoin (FRA)	—
65.	Arenda Grimberg (NED)	—
66.	Erica Green Groenewald (RSA)	—
67.	Susan Carter (GBR)	+ 20.13
68.	Magali LeFloch (FRA)	+ 20.28
69.	Yuliya Murenka (UKR)	—
70.	Madeleine Lindberg (SWE)	—
71.	Sara Carrigan (AUS)	—
72.	Larysa Chuyenka (BLR)	—
73.	Vanessa Cheatley (NZL)	—
74.	Tatsiana Makeyeva (BLR)	—
75.	Kim Shirley (AUS)	—
76.	Irina Chuzhynova (UKR)	—
77.	Ioulya Razenkova (RUS)	—
78.	Rosalind Reekie-May (NZL)	—
79.	Priska Doppmann (SUI)	—
80.	Montserrat Alonso (ESP)	—
81.	Lensy Debboudt (BEL)	+ 22.27
82.	Ghita Beltman (NED)	—
83.	Ulrike Baumgartner (AUT)	—
84.	Kerstin Scheitle (GER)	+ 22.44
85.	Alison Wright (AUS)	+ 25.00
86.	Dorota Czynszak (POL)	—
87.	Karla Polivková (CZE)	+ 28.05
88.	Miho Oki (JPN)	—
89.	Lisbeth Simper (DEN)	+ 29.42
90.	Karen Dunne (USA)	+ 30.48
91.	Rikke Sandhøj-Olsen (DEN)	—
92.	Ruth Martínez (ESP)	—
93.	Gabriela González (MEX)	—
