= 2004 UCI Road World Championships – Women's time trial =

Women's time trial
2004 UCI Road World Championships
- Rainbow jersey

Race details
- Dates: 28 September 2004 in Verona, Italy
- Stages: 1
- Distance: 24.05 km (14.94 mi)
- Winning time: 30' 53"

Medalists
	Gold	Karin Thürig (SUI)
	Silver	Judith Arndt (GER)
	Bronze	Zulfiya Zabirova (RUS)

The Women's time trial at the 2004 UCI Road World Championships took place over a distance of 24.05 kilometres (14.9 miles) in Verona, Bardolino, Italy on 28 September 2004.

== Final classification ==
Rank	Rider	Country	Time
1st place, gold medalist(s)	Karin Thürig	Switzerland	30' 53"
2nd place, silver medalist(s)	Judith Arndt	Germany	+ 51"
3rd place, bronze medalist(s)	Zulfiya Zabirova	Russia	+ 56"
4	Joane Somarriba	Spain	+ 1' 15"
5	Edita Pučinskaitė	Lithuania	+ 1' 32"
6	Mirjam Melchers	Netherlands	+ 1' 41"
7	Christine Thorburn	United States	+ 1' 44"
8	Priska Doppmann	Switzerland	+ 1' 54"
9	Oenone Wood	Australia	+ 2' 07"
10	Tatiana Guderzo	Italy	+ 2' 11"
11	Anita Valen de Vries	Norway	+ 2' 16"
12	Svetlana Boubnenkova	Russia	+ 2' 16"
13	Trixi Worrack	Germany	+ 2' 16"
14	Deirdre Demet-Barry	United States	+ 2' 17"
15	Jeannie Longo	France	+ 2' 29"
16	Olivia Gollan	Australia	+ 2' 38"
17	Bogumiła Matusiak	Poland	+ 2' 44"
18	Dori Ruano Sanchon	Spain	+ 2' 49"
19	Anna Zugno	Italy	+ 3' 02"
20	Edwige Pitel	France	+ 3' 03"
21	Susan Palmer-Komar	Canada	+ 3' 15"
22	Blaža Klemenčič	Slovenia	+ 3' 16"
23	Tatiana Shishkova	Moldova	+ 3' 31"
24	Natacha Maes	Belgium	+ 3' 34"
25	Jolanta Polikevičiūtė	Lithuania	+ 3' 41"
26	Evy Van Damme	Belgium	+ 3' 42"
27	Ana Paola Madrinan Villegas	Colombia	+ 3' 46"
28	Malgorzata Wysocka	Poland	+ 3' 57"
29	Natalya Kachalka	Ukraine	+ 4' 02"
30	Maria Cagigas	Spain	+ 4' 04"
31	Loes Gunnewijk	Netherlands	+ 4' 26"
32	Tiina Nieminen	Finland	+ 4' 31"
33	Amy Moore	Canada	+ 5' 09"
34	Verónica Leal	Mexico	+ 7' 20"
DNS	Christiane Soeder	Austria	-
