= Gouden Pijl =

Annual cycling race in the Netherlands

Race details
- Date: 3rd tuesday after the Tour de France
- Region: Emmen, Netherlands
- Discipline: Road race
- Type: criterium
- Organiser: Foundation De Nieuwe Pijl
- Web site: www.goudenpijl.nl

History
- First edition: Men: 1976; Women: 2003
- Editions: Men: 36 (as of 2013); Women: 11 (as of 2013)
- First winner: Men; Gerben Karstens (NED); Women; Chantal Beltman (NED)
- Most recent: Men; Pieter Weening (NED); Women; Marianne Vos (NED)

Gouden Pijl (English: Golden Arrow), is an elite men's and women's professional road bicycle racing criterium held annually in Emmen, the Netherlands. The first edition was in 1976 and since 2003 the event also includes a women's race.

== Honours ==
=== Men's ===
Year	Winner	Second	Third
2013	Pieter Weening (NED)	Laurens ten Dam (NED)	Marcel Kittel (GER)
2012	Luis León Sánchez (ESP)	Alexander Vinokourov (KAZ)	Peter Sagan (SVK)
2011	~~Alberto Contador (ESP)~~	Addy Engels (NED)	Pieter Weening (NED)
2010	Samuel Sánchez (ESP)	Lars Boom (NED)	Cadel Evans (AUS)
2009	Andy Schleck (LUX)	Robert Gesink (NED)	Albert Timmer (NED)
2008	Óscar Freire (ESP)	Steven de Jongh (NED)	Servais Knaven (NED)
2007	Danilo Di Luca (ITA)	Karsten Kroon (NED)	Cadel Evans (AUS)
2006	Fränk Schleck (LUX)	Michael Boogerd (NED)	Addy Engels (NED)
2005	Ivan Basso (ITA)	Karsten Kroon (NED)	Bart Voskamp (NED)
2004	Robbie McEwen (AUS)	Bram de Groot (NED)	Ivan Basso (ITA)
2003	Léon van Bon (NED)	Alexander Vinokourov (KAZ)	Michael Boogerd (NED)
2002	Michael Boogerd (NED)	Rudie Kemna (NED)	Léon van Bon (NED)
2001	Stuart O'Grady (AUS)	Jans Koerts (NED)	Marc Wauters (BEL)
2000	Erik Dekker (NED)	Tristan Hoffman (NED)	Michael Boogerd (NED)
1999	Peter Van Petegem (BEL)	Kurt Van De Wouwer (BEL)	Erik Dekker (NED)
1998	Servais Knaven (NED)	Léon van Bon (NED)	Mario Cipollini (ITA)
1997	Jan Ullrich (GER)	Léon van Bon (NED)	Servais Knaven (NED)
1996	Wiebren Veenstra (NED)	Jeroen Blijlevens (NED)	Jan Ullrich (GER)
1993	Frans Maassen (NED)	Wiebren Veenstra (NED)	Gert Jakobs (NED)
1992	Claudio Chiappucci (ITA)	Rob Harmeling (NED)	Miguel Induráin (ESP)
1991	Gert-Jan Theunisse (NED)	Olaf Ludwig (GER)	Gert Jakobs (NED)
1990	Jelle Nijdam (NED)	Jan Siemons (NED)	Raúl Alcalá (MEX)
1989	Greg LeMond (USA)	Claude Criquielion (BEL)	Gert Jakobs (NED)
1988	Phil Anderson (AUS)	Adri van der Poel (NED)	Erik Breukink (NED)
1987	Laurent Fignon (FRA)	Jos Lammertink (NED)	Joop Zoetemelk (NED)
1986	Guido Bontempi (ITA)	Theo Smit (NED)	Johan van der Velde (NED)
1985	Seán Kelly (IRL)	Adri van der Poel (NED)	Nico Verhoeven (NED)
1984	Gerard Veldscholten (NED)	Leo van Vliet (NED)	Greg LeMond (USA)
1983	Peter Winnen (NED)	Lucien Van Impe (BEL)	Gerard Veldscholten (NED)
1982	Leo van Vliet (NED)	Gregor Braun (GER)	Jos Lammertink (NED)
1981	Jan Raas (NED)	Jos Lammertink (NED)	Walter Planckaert (BEL)
1980	Joop Zoetemelk (NED)	Michel Pollentier (BEL)	Rudy Pevenage (BEL)
1979	Hennie Kuiper (NED)	Géry Verlinden (BEL)	Walter Godefroot (BEL)
1978	Gerrie Knetemann (NED)	Marc Demeyer (BEL)	Jan Raas (NED)
1977	Michel Pollentier (BEL)	Wilfried Wesemael (BEL)	Gerard Vianen (NED)
1976	Gerben Karstens (NED)	Albert Hulzebosch (NED)	José De Cauwer (BEL)

=== Women's ===
Year	Winner	Second	Third
2013	Marianne Vos (NED)	Ellen van Dijk (NED)	Lucinda Brand (NED)
2012	Marianne Vos (NED)	Iris Slappendel (NED)	Roxane Knetemann (NED)
2011	Janneke Ensing (NED)	Andrea Bosman (NED)	Roxane Knetemann (NED)
2010	Andrea Bosman (NED)	Janneke Ensing (NED)	Arenda Grimberg (NED)
2009	Loes Gunnewijk (NED)	Janneke Ensing (NED)	Arenda Grimberg (NED)
2008	Loes Gunnewijk (NED)	Lucinda Brand (NED)	Ellen van Dijk (NED)
2007	Christine Mos (NED)	Josephine Groenveld (NED)	Marianne Vos (NED)
2006	Suzanne de Goede (NED)	Marianne Vos (NED)	Sissy van Alebeek (NED)
2005	Suzanne de Goede (NED)	Bertine Spijkerman (NED)	Christine Mos (NED)
2004	Chantal Beltman (NED)	Christine Mos (NED)	Renate Groenewold (NED)
2003	Chantal Beltman (NED)	Josephine Groenveld (NED)	Vera Koedooder (NED)
