= 2006 Giro della Toscana Int. Femminile – Memorial Michela Fanini =

Race details
- Dates: 12–17 September 2006
- Stages: 8 (counted 4 half stages as 4 stages)
- Winning time: 15h 20' 29"

Results
	Winner	Svetlana Bubnenkova (RUS)	(Fenixs–Colnago)
	Second	Marianne Vos (NED)	(Netherlands national team)
	Third	Suzanne de Goede (NED)	(AA-Drink Cycling Team)

The 2006 Giro della Toscana Int. Femminile – Memorial Michela Fanini was the 13th edition of the Giro della Toscana Int. Femminile – Memorial Michela Fanini, a women's cycling stage race in Italy. It was rated by the UCI as category 2.1 race, and was held between 12 and 17 September 2006.

== Stages ==
=== Stage 1 ===
12 September 2006 – Viareggio to Viareggio, 8.2 km (5.1 mi), Team time trial

Stage 1 Result

	Team	Riders	Time
1	Netherlands national team	Ellen van Dijk (NED); Iris Slappendel (NED); Marianne Vos (NED); Chantal Beltman (NED); Irene van den Broek (NED); Loes Markerink (NED); Elisabeth Braam (NED)	6' 37"
2	AA Drink Cycling Team	Suzanne de Goede (NED); Adrie Visser (NED); Theresa Senff (GER); Kirsten Wild (NED); Nathalie Bates (AUS); Josephine Groenveld (NED); Corine Hierckens (BEL)	+ 5"
3	Buitenpoort - Flexpoint Team	Amber Neben (AUS); Madeleine Sandig (GER); Linda Villumsen (DEN); Annette Beutler (SUI); Luise Keller (GER)	+7"

General Classification after Stage 1

	Rider	Team	Time
1	Ellen van Dijk (NED)	Netherlands national team	6' 37"
2	Marianne Vos (NED)	Netherlands national team	+ 0"
3	Chantal Beltman (NED)	Netherlands national team	+ 0"
4	Iris Slappendel (NED)	Netherlands national team	+ 0"
5	Irene van den Broek (NED)	Netherlands national team	+ 0"

=== Stage 2a ===
13 September 2006 – Porcari to Montecarlo, 57.2 km (35.5 mi)

Stage 2a Result

	Rider	Team	Time
1	Noemi Cantele (ITA)	Bigla Cycling Team	1h 31' 00"
2	Judith Arndt (GER)	Team T-Mobile Women	s.t.
3	Marianne Vos (NED)	Netherlands national team	s.t.
4	Giorgia Bronzini (ITA)	A.S. Team F.R.W	s.t.
5	Theresa Senff (GER)	AA-Drink Cycling Team	s.t.

General Classification after Stage 2a

	Rider	Team	Time
1	Marianne Vos (NED)	Netherlands national team	1h 37' 35"
2	Noemi Cantele (ITA)	Bigla Cycling Team	+0"
3	Chantal Beltman (GER)	Netherlands national team	+2"
4	Theresa Senff (GER)	AA-Drink Cycling Team	+7"
5	Suzanne de Goede (NED)	AA-Drink Cycling Team	+7"

=== Stage 2b ===
13 September 2006 – Altopascio to Altopascio, 67.9 km (42.2 mi)

Stage 2b Result

	Rider	Team	Time
1	Giorgia Bronzini (ITA)	A.S. Team F.R.W	1h 36' 41"
2	Marianne Vos (NED)	Netherlands national team	s.t.
3	Suzanne de Goede (NED)	AA-Drink Cycling Team	s.t.
4	Ina-Yoko Teutenberg (GER)	Team T-Mobile Women	s.t.
5	Angela Brodtka (GER)	Germany national team	s.t.

General Classification after Stage 2b

	Rider	Team	Time
1	Marianne Vos (NED)	Netherlands national team	3h 14' 09"
2	Noemi Cantele (ITA)	Bigla Cycling Team	+7"
3	Chantal Beltman (GER)	Netherlands national team	+8"
4	Suzanne de Goede (NED)	AA-Drink Cycling Team	+12"
5	Theresa Senff (GER)	AA-Drink Cycling Team	+14"

=== Stage 3 ===
14 September 2006 – Lari to Volterra, 121.6 km (75.6 mi)

Stage 3 Result

	Rider	Team	Time
1	Nicole Brändli (SUI)	Bigla Cycling Team	3h 36' 40"
2	Svetlana Bubnenkova (RUS)	Fenixs–Colnago	+ 4"
3	Judith Arndt (GER)	Team T-Mobile Women	+ 29"
4	Claudia Häusler (GER)	Equipe Nürnberger Versicherung	+ 29"
5	Marianne Vos (NED)	Netherlands national team	+ 34"

General Classification after Stage 3

	Rider	Team	Time
1	Nicole Brändli (SUI)	Bigla Cycling Team	6h 50' 53"
2	Marianne Vos (NED)	Netherlands national team	+ 30"
3	Svetlana Bubnenkova (RUS)	Fenixs–Colnago	+ 31"
4	Judith Arndt (GER)	Team T-Mobile Women	+ 43"
5	Suzanne de Goede (NED)	AA-Drink Cycling Team	+46"

=== Stage 4a ===
15 September 2006 – Castelfranco Di Sotto to Castelfranco Di Sotto, 70.2 km (43.6 mi)

Stage 4a Result

	Rider	Team	Time
1	Noemi Cantele (ITA)	Bigla Cycling Team	1h 43' 56"
2	Kimberly Anderson (USA)	Team T-Mobile Women	s.t.
3	Daniela Fusas Poli (ITA)	Safi–Pasta Zara–Manhattan	s.t.
4	Svetlana Bubnenkova (RUS)	Fenixs–Colnago	s.t.
5	Suzanne de Goede (NED)	AA-Drink Cycling Team	s.t.

General Classification after Stage 4a

	Rider	Team	Time
1	Nicole Brändli (SUI)	Bigla Cycling Team	8h 35' 03"
2	Svetlana Bubnenkova (RUS)	Fenixs–Colnago	+ 17"
3	Marianne Vos (NED)	Netherlands national team	+ 30"
4	Judith Arndt (GER)	Team T-Mobile Women	+ 43"
5	Suzanne de Goede (NED)	AA-Drink Cycling Team	+46"

=== Stage 4b ===
15 September 2006 – Campi Bisenzio to Campi Bisenzio,

Stage 4b Result

	Rider	Team	Time
1	Ina-Yoko Teutenberg (GER)	Team T-Mobile Women	1h 16' 49"
2	Suzanne de Goede (NED)	AA-Drink Cycling Team	
3	Giorgia Bronzini (ITA)	A.S. Team F.R.W	
4	Angela Brodtka (GER)	Germany national team	
5	Ludivine Henrion (BEL)	Lotto-Belisol Ladies Team	

General Classification after Stage 4b

	Rider	Team	Time
1	Svetlana Bubnenkova (RUS)	Fenixs–Colnago	

=== Stage 5 ===
16 September 2006 – Segromigno in Piano to Capannori, 109.2 km (67.9 mi)

Stage 5 Result

	Rider	Team	Time
1	Svetlana Bubnenkova (RUS)	Fenixs–Colnago	2h 51' 13"
2	Suzanne de Goede (NED)	AA-Drink Cycling Team	+ 41"
3	Marianne Vos (NED)	Netherlands national team	+ 41"
4	Mette Fischer Andreasen (DEN)	Bianchi Aliverti Kookai	+ 41"
5	Clemilda Fernandes Silva (BRA)	Fanini System Data	+ 41"

General Classification after Stage 5

	Rider	Team	Time
1	Svetlana Bubnenkova (RUS)	Fenixs–Colnago	12h 43' 09"
2	Marianne Vos (NED)	Netherlands national team	+ 58"
3	Suzanne de Goede (NED)	AA-Drink Cycling Team	+ 1' 13"
4	Claudia Häusler (GER)	Equipe Nürnberger Versicherung	+ 1' 54"
5	Theresa Senff (GER)	AA-Drink Cycling Team	2' 02"

=== Stage 6 ===
17 September 2006 – Quarrata to Florence, 106.9 km (66.4 mi)

Stage 6 Result

	Rider	Team	Time
1	Noemi Cantele (ITA)	Fenixs–Colnago	1h 43' 53"
2	Kimberly Anderson (USA)	Team T-Mobile Women	s.t.
3	Daniela Fusar Poli (ITA)	Netherlands national team	s.t.
4	Svetlana Bubnenkova (RUS)	Fenixs–Colnago	s.t.
5	Suzanne de Goede (NED)	AA-Drink Cycling Team	+ 14"

General Classification after Stage 6

	Rider	Team	Time
1	Svetlana Bubnenkova (RUS)	Fenixs–Colnago	15h 20' 29"
2	Marianne Vos (NED)	Netherlands national team	
3	Suzanne de Goede (NED)	AA-Drink Cycling Team	
4	Claudia Häusler (GER)	Equipe Nürnberger Versicherung	
5	Theresa Senff (GER)	AA-Drink Cycling Team	

== Final classification ==
	Rider	Team	Time
1	Svetlana Bubnenkova (RUS)	Fenixs–Colnago	15h 20' 29"
2	Marianne Vos (NED)	Netherlands national team	
3	Suzanne de Goede (NED)	AA-Drink Cycling Team	
4	Claudia Häusler (GER)	Equipe Nürnberger Versicherung	
5	Theresa Senff (GER)	AA-Drink Cycling Team	
6	Clemilda Fernandes Silva (BRA)	Fanini System Data	
7	Natalia Boyarskaya (RUS)	Fenixs–Colnago	
8	Andrea Graus (AUT)	Bigla Cycling Team	
9	Fabiana Luperini (ITA)	Top Girls Fassa Bortolo Raxy Line	
10	Dorte Rasmussen (DEN)	Bianchi Aliverti Kookai	

== See also ==
- 2006 in women's road cycling
