= 2009 Dutch National Road Race Championships – Women's road race =

Women's road race
2009 Dutch National Road Race Championships

Race details
- Dates: 27 June 2009
- Stages: 1
- Distance: 117 km (72.70 mi)
- Winning time: 3h 24' 28"

Medalists
	Gold	Marianne Vos	(DSB Bank–LTO)
	Silver	Chantal Blaak	(Leontien.nl)
	Bronze	Andrea Bosman	(Leontien.nl)

The Women's road race of the 2009 Dutch National Road Race Championships cycling event took place on 27 June 2009. The race started in the province Limburg in Heerlen and finished in Landgraaf, the Netherlands. The competition was run over a 117 km course. 64 women's finished the race.

== Final results (top 10) ==
Rank	Rider	Team	Time
1	Marianne Vos	DSB Bank–LTO	3h 24' 28"
2	Chantal Blaak	Leontien.nl	+ 1’ 01"
3	Andrea Bosman	Leontien.nl	+ 1' 47"
4	Adrie Visser	DSB Bank–LTO	+ 1' 47"
5	Kirsten Wild	Cervélo Test Team	+ 1' 47"
6	Suzanne de Goede	Equipe Nürnberger Versicherung	+ 1' 47"
7	Annemiek van Vleuten	DSB Bank–LTO	+ 1' 47"
8	Martine Bras	Selle Italia–Ghezzi	+ 1' 47"
9	Ellen van Dijk	Team Columbia–High Road Women	+ 1' 47"
10	Mascha Pijnenborg	Red Sun Cycling Team	+ 1' 47"

== See also ==
- 2009 Dutch National Time Trial Championships – Women's time trial
