= Maria Silva =

Maria Silva may refer to:

- Maria Lucilene Silva, road cyclist from Brazil
- Maria Cavaco Silva (born 1938), First Lady of Portugal from 2006 until 2016
- Maria Paula Silva (born 1962), Brazilian basketball player
- Maria Silva Cruz (1915–1936), Spanish anarchist executed during the Casas Viejas incident
- María Silva (actress) (born 1941), Spanish film and television actress
- Maria José Silva (born 1983), Nicaraguan racing cyclist
- María Fernanda Silva (born 1965), Argentine diplomat
- María Eleonora Silva Silva (1930–2016), Peruvian politician
- María Inés Silva Vila (1927–1991), Uruguayan writer

== See also ==
- Maria Sílvia (1944–2009), Brazilian film, stage, and television actress
