= Jutras =

Jutras may have several meanings :

- Claude Jutra: an award-winning French Canadian filmmaker
  - Jutra Award: Film awards formerly given in the Canadian province of Quebec, named after the filmmaker and now known as Prix Iris
  - The Claude Jutra Award: An award formerly given by the Canadian Genie Awards for a director's first feature film and now known as the Canadian Screen Award for Best First Feature
- Benoît Jutras, composer
- Normand Jutras, a politician
- René Jutras, a politician
- Manon Jutras, an athlete
- Paul Jutras, a Canadian film editor
