= 2009 Omloop Het Nieuwsblad (women's race) =

Race details
- Dates: 28 February 2009
- Stages: 1
- Distance: 128.2 km (79.7 mi)
- Winning time: 3h 33' 28"

Results
	Winner	Suzanne de Goede (NED)	(Equipe Nürnberger Versicherung)
	Second	Noemi Cantele (ITA)	(Bigla Cycling Team)
	Third	Kelly Druyts (BEL)	(Topsport Vlaanderen–Thompson Ladies Team)

The 2009 Omloop Het Nieuwsblad was the 4th edition of the women's Omloop Het Nieuwsblad road cycling one-day race, which was held on 28 February.

The race was won by Dutch rider Suzanne de Goede in a bunch sprint.

== Results ==
Final general classification
Rank	Rider	Team	Time
1	Suzanne de Goede (NED)	Equipe Nürnberger Versicherung	3h 33' 28"
2	Noemi Cantele (ITA)	Bigla Cycling Team	+ 0"
3	Kelly Druyts (BEL)	Topsport Vlaanderen–Thompson Ladies Team	+ 0"
4	Chantal van den Broek-Blaak (NED)	leontien.nl	+ 0"
5	Sophie Creux (FRA)	ESGL 93 - GSD Gestion	+ 0"
6	Adrie Visser (NED)	DSB Bank - Nederland bloeit	+ 0"
7	Mirjam Melchers-Van Poppel (NED)	Team Flexpoint	+ 0"
8	Andrea Bosman (NED)	leontien.nl	+ 0"
9	Ludivine Henrion (BEL)	-	+ 0"
10	Monique van de Ree (NED)	leontien.nl	+ 0"
