= Noelia Fernández =

Noelia Fernández may refer to:

- Noelia Fernández (cyclist) (born 1978), Argentinian former road cyclist
- Noelia Fernández (gymnast) (born 1976), Spanish former rhythmic gymnast and coach
