= Cristina Alcalde =

Spanish cyclist

Personal information
- Born: 3 March 1980 (age 46) Spain

Cycling career
- Sport: Cycling
- Discipline: Road cycling

Professional team
- 2009–2013: Bizkaia–Durango

Cristina Alcalde (born 3 March 1980) is a road cyclist from Spain. She represented her nation at the 2004 UCI Road World Championships.
