= Dianne Emery =

South African cyclist

Personal information
- Born: 4 January 1984 (age 42) South Africa

Cycling career
- Sport: Cycling
- Discipline: Road cycling

Professional team
- 2009: MTN Ladies Team

Dianne Emery (born 4 January 1984) is a road cyclist from South Africa. She represented her nation at the 2004 UCI Road World Championships.
