= 2009 Team Columbia–HTC Women season =

2009 Team Columbia–High Road Women
- UCI Team ranking: 2nd
- Manager: Bob Stapleton

Season victories
- One-day races
- Stage race overall
- Best ranked rider: Judith Arndt (5th)

The 2009 season was the eighth for the Team Columbia–High Road Women cycling team, which began as the T-Mobile team in 2003. The main new riders for the team were the European Time Trial Champion Ellen van Dijk and the Canadian national champion Alex Wrubleski. Alexis Rhodes and Madeleine Sandig left the team and Anke Wichmann and Oenone Wood both retired.

== Roster ==
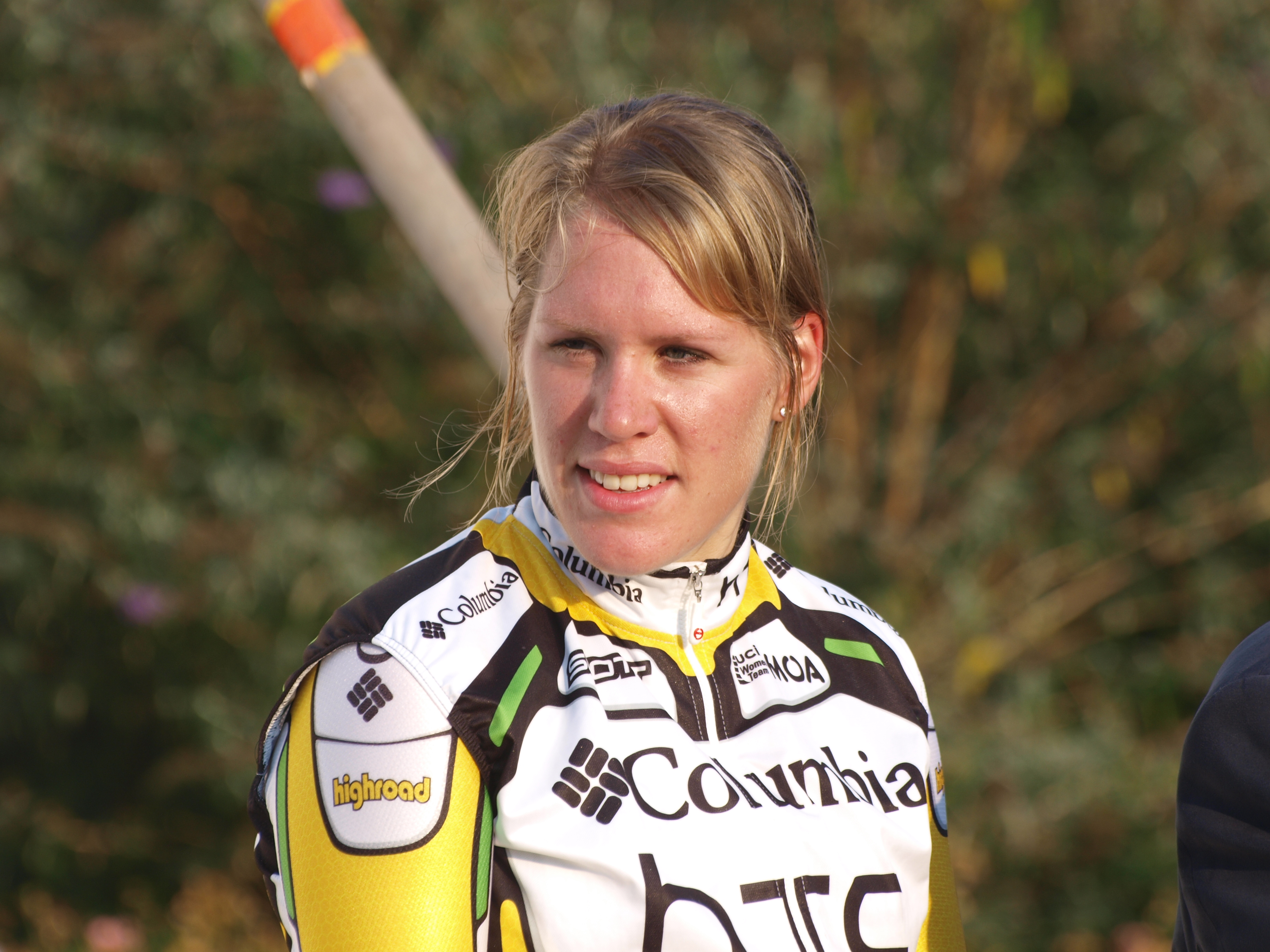
Ellen van Dijk, the main new rider

The team was presented together with the males team on 11 January 2009 in Mallorca.

The main new rider for the team was Ellen van Dijk, 21 years old, a time trial specialist and the European Time Trial Champion (under-23). The Canadian Alex Wrubleski, national champion and the winner of the Redlands Bicycle Classic also joined the team.

The contract of Alexis Rhodes ended and she moved to Webcor on the recommendation of Scrymgeour. Madeleine Sandig moved to Equipe Nürnberger Versicherung and Anke Wichmann and Oenone Wood retired.

Ages as of 1 January 2009.

Rider	Date of birth
Mara Abbott (USA)	November 14, 1985 (aged 23)
Kim Anderson (USA)	January 28, 1968 (aged 40)
Judith Arndt (GER)	July 23, 1976 (aged 32)
Kate Bates (AUS)	May 18, 1982 (aged 26)
Chantal Beltman (NED)	August 26, 1976 (aged 32)
Ellen van Dijk (NED)	February 11, 1987 (aged 21)

Rider	Date of birth
Emilia Fahlin (SWE)	October 24, 1988 (aged 20)
Luise Keller (GER)	March 8, 1984 (aged 24)
Maria Mendel (GER)	September 30, 1987 (aged 21)
Ina-Yoko Teutenberg (GER)	October 28, 1974 (aged 34)
Linda Villumsen Serup (DEN)	April 9, 1985 (aged 23)
Alexandra Wrubleski (CAN)	May 31, 1984 (aged 24)

Riders who joined the team for the 2009 season

Rider	2008 team
Ellen van Dijk (NED)	Vrienden van het Platteland
Maria Mendel (GER)	
Alexandra Wrubleski (GER)	Webcor Builders Cycling Team

Riders who left the team during or after the 2008 season

Rider	2009 team
Alexis Rhodes (AUS)	Webcor
Madeleine Sandig (GER)	Equipe Nürnberger Versicherung
Anke Wichmann (GER)	Retired
Oenone Wood (GER)	Retired

== Season ==
=== February ===
The season started for the team with the Ladies Tour of Qatar in February. Ellen van Dijk secured the Best Young Rider prize, with consistency after taking the jersey on the first day when she made it into the front group of 21 riders and finished third. The last hour of the last stage was a tense affair for the Dutchwoman, when she was caught on the wrong side of a split. She had to get past seven groups and finally crossed the line in sixth place, in the same time as stage winner, and won the overall Best Young Rider's classification.

== Results ==
=== Season victories ===
Single day and stage races 2009
Date	Nation	Race	Cat.	Winner
10 February	Qatar	Youth classification Ladies Tour of Qatar	2.1	(Netherlands) Ellen van Dijk
5 April	Belgium	Tour of Flanders for Women	CDM	(Germany) Ina-Yoko Teutenberg
10 April	Netherlands	Drentse 8 van Dwingeloo	1.1	(Germany) Ina-Yoko Teutenberg
18 April	Netherlands	Ronde van Gelderland	1.2	(Germany) Ina-Yoko Teutenberg
2 May	Czech Republic	Stage 4 Gracia–Orlová	2.2	(Germany) Ina-Yoko Teutenberg
15 May	France	Prologue Tour de l'Aude Cycliste Féminin	2.1	(Denmark) Linda Villumsen
16 May	France	Stage 1 Tour de l'Aude Cycliste Féminin	2.1	(Germany) Ina-Yoko Teutenberg
18 May	France	Stage 3 Tour de l'Aude Cycliste Féminin	2.1	(Germany) Ina-Yoko Teutenberg
24 May	France	Stage 9 Tour de l'Aude Cycliste Féminin	2.1	(Germany) Ina-Yoko Teutenberg
7 June	United States	Liberty Classic	1.1	(Germany) Ina-Yoko Teutenberg
11 June	Spain	Stage 1 Emakumeen Euskal Bira	2.1	(Germany) Judith Arndt
13 June	Spain	Stage 3 Emakumeen Euskal Bira	2.1	(Germany) Judith Arndt
14 June	Spain	Stage 4 Emakumeen Euskal Bira	2.1	(Germany) Judith Arndt
14 June	Spain	General classification Emakumeen Euskal Bira	2.1	(Germany) Judith Arndt
18 June	Netherlands	Stage 1 Ster Zeeuwsche Eilanden	2.2	(Denmark) Linda Villumsen
20 June	Netherlands	General classification Ster Zeeuwsche Eilanden	2.2	(Germany) Ina-Yoko Teutenberg
6 July	Italy	Stage 3 Giro d'Italia Femminile	2.1	(United States) Mara Abbott
7 July	Italy	Stage 4 Giro d'Italia Femminile	2.1	(Germany) Ina-Yoko Teutenberg
9 July	Italy	Stage 6 Giro d'Italia Femminile	2.1	(Germany) Judith Arndt
23 July	Germany	Stage 3 Thüringen Rundfahrt der Frauen	2.1	(Denmark) Linda Villumsen
26 July	Germany	General classification Thüringen Rundfahrt der Frauen	2.1	(Denmark) Linda Villumsen
10 August	France	Stage 1 Route de France Féminine	2.1	(Germany) Ina-Yoko Teutenberg
12 August	France	Stage 3 Route de France Féminine	2.1	(Germany) Ina-Yoko Teutenberg
14 August	France	General classification Route de France Féminine	2.1	(United States) Kimberly Anderson
28 August	Netherlands	Profronde van Almelo		(Netherlands) Chantal Beltman
2 September	Netherlands	Stage 2 Holland Ladies Tour	2.2	(Netherlands) Ellen van Dijk
5 September	Netherlands	Stage 5 Holland Ladies Tour	2.2	(Germany) Ina-Yoko Teutenberg
19 September	Italy	Stage 5 Giro della Toscana Int. Femminile – Memorial Michela Fanini	2.1	(Germany) Ina-Yoko Teutenberg
13 November	Australia	Prologue Tour de Perth		(Netherlands) Ellen van Dijk

National, Continental and World champions 2009
Date	Discipline	Jersey	Winner
25 June	Danish National Time Trial Championships		Linda Villumsen
27 June	Danish National Road Race Championships		Linda Villumsen
25 June	Swedish National Time Trial Championships		Emilia Fahlin
25 June	German National Road Race Championships		Ina-Yoko Teutenberg
1 July	European Road Championships – Time Trial		(Netherlands) Ellen van Dijk

== Results in major races ==
=== Women's World Cup 2009 ===
Judith Arndt finished 4th in the individual and the team finished 5th in the teams overall standing.

Results at the World Cup races
Date	#	Race	Best rider	Place
29 March	1	Trofeo Alfredo Binda-Comune di Cittiglio	(Denmark) Linda Villumsen	14
5 April	2	Tour of Flanders for Women	(Germany) Ina-Yoko Teutenberg	1
13 April	3	Ronde van Drenthe	(Germany) Ina-Yoko Teutenberg	7
22 April	4	La Flèche Wallonne Féminine	(United States) Mara Abbott	7
10 May	5	Tour de Berne	(Denmark) Linda Villumsen	8
30 May	6	Coupe du Monde Cycliste Féminine de Montréal	(United States) Mara Abbott	11
31 July	7	Open de Suède Vårgårda TTT	Team Columbia–HTC Women	2
2 August	8	Open de Suède Vårgårda	(Denmark) Linda Villumsen	12
22 August	9	Grand Prix de Plouay	-	-
13 September	10	Rund um die Nürnberger Altstadt	(Germany) Ina-Yoko Teutenberg	3

=== Grand Tours ===
Results of the team in the grand tours
Grand tour	Giro d'Italia Femminile
Rider (classification)	Mara Abbott (2nd)
Victories	3 stage wins

== UCI World Ranking ==
The team finished second in the UCI ranking for teams, behind Cervélo TestTeam (women).

Individual UCI World Ranking
Rank	Rider	Points
5	(Germany) Ina-Yoko Teutenberg	582.45
10	(Germany) Judith Arndt	431.25
15	(Denmark) Linda Villumsen	365.2
29	(United States) Mara Abbott	202
38	(United States) Kim Anderson	152.5
52	(Netherlands) Ellen van Dijk	96.75
81	(Sweden) Emilia Fahlin	54.25
82	(Netherlands) Chantal Beltman	53.2
288	(Canada) Alexandra Wrubleski	6
381	(Germany) Luise Keller	1.7
