= Hayley Rutherford =

Australian road cyclist

Personal information
- Born: 17 July 1980 (44 years) Australia

Cycling career
- Sport: Cycling
- Discipline: Road cycling

Professional teams
- 2003: Road Runner Guerciotti
- 2004: S.C. Michela Fanini Record Rox
- 2005: Team Bianchi-Aliverti

Hayley Anne Rutherford, born on 17 July, is a road cyclist from Australia. She is known for her performances in both national and international competitions. She is particularly known for her consistent performances in time trials and road races. She represented her nation at the 2000, 2001, 2002 and 2004 UCI Road World Championships. She took second place in the National championships Australia WE - Road race in 2002 and then again in Geelong Tour in 2003.

Her all-time ranking overall is currently at 629, Her most recent participation being in 2006 in the New Zealand World Championship (CDM).
