= 2012 Durango-Durango Emakumeen Saria =

Race details
- Dates: 5 June 2012
- Stages: 1
- Distance: 113 km (70.21 mi)
- Winning time: 2h 51' 35"

Results
	Winner	Emma Pooley (Great Britain)	(AA Drink–leontien.nl)
	Second	Charlotte Becker (Germany)	(Team Specialized–lululemon)
	Third	Judith Arndt (Germany)	(Orica–AIS)

The 2012 Durango-Durango Emakumeen Saria was the eleventh running of the Durango-Durango Emakumeen Saria, a women's bicycle race in Spain. It was held on 5 June 2012 over a distance of 113 kilometres (70.2 miles). It was rated by the UCI as a 1.2 category race.

== Results ==
	Cyclist	Team	Time
1	Emma Pooley (GBR)	AA Drink–leontien.nl	2h 51' 35"
2	Charlotte Becker (GER)	Team Specialized–lululemon	+ 54"
3	Judith Arndt (GER)	Orica–AIS	+ 54"
4	Elizabeth Armitstead (GBR)	AA Drink–leontien.nl	+ 54"
5	Annemiek van Vleuten (NED)	Rabobank Women Cycling Team	+ 54"
6	Alena Amialiusik (BLR)	BePink	+ 54"
7	Emma Johansson (SWE)	Hitec Products–Mistral Home Cycling Team	+ 54"
8	Sharon Laws (GBR)	AA Drink–leontien.nl	+ 54"
9	Lucinda Brand (NED)	AA Drink–leontien.nl	+ 54"
10	Ellen van Dijk (NED)	Team Specialized–lululemon	+ 54"
