= Nicole Demars =

Personal information
- Born: 17 August 1970 (age 56) Canada

Cycling career
- Sport: Cycling
- Discipline: Road cycling

Professional teams
- 2001: 800.COM
- 2003–2004: Victory Brewing Cycling Team

Nicole Demars (born 17 August 1970) is a road cyclist from Canada. She represented her nation at the 2004 UCI Road World Championships.
