= Irene Hostettler =

Swiss cyclist

Cycling career
- Sport: Cycling
- Discipline: Road cycling

Professional team
- 2003–2004: Team Next 125

Irene Hostettler is a road cyclist from Switzerland. She represented her nation at the 2003 and 2004 UCI Road World Championships.
