= Christine Mos =

Dutch bicycle racer (born 1972)

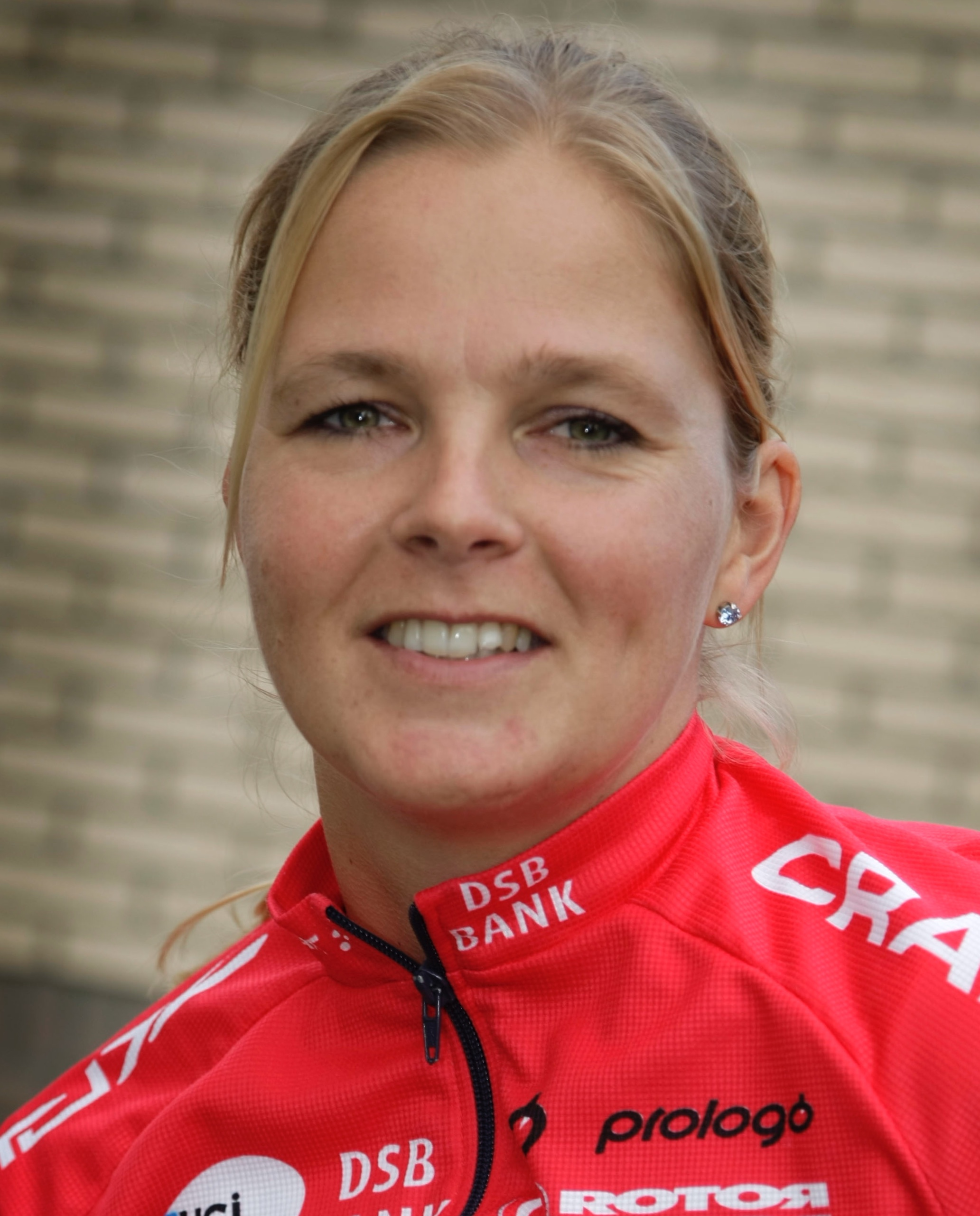
- Christine Mos

Personal information
- Born: 14 July 1972 (age 54) De Wijk, the Netherlands

Cycling career
- Sport: Cycling
- Current team: Retired
- Discipline: Road
- Role: Rider

Professional teams
- 1998: Hartol
- 1999: Hartol - Farm Frites
- 2000: Toscany - Ahoy
- 2001: Bik - Toscany Sport
- 2002: Power Plate - Bik
- 2003: Bik Powerplate
- 2004-2005: Therme Skin Care
- 2006: DSB - Ballast Nedam
- 2007: DSB Bank

Christine Mos (De Wijk, July 14, 1972 ) is a former Dutch cyclist. In 2003 Mos achieved second place in the Dutch road cycling championship. Her top results include 9th in the Rotterdam Tour and 5th in the Ronde van Gelderland.

== Key results ==
2001

- 12th, (Netherlands) Dutch National Road Race Championships

2002

- 9th, Rotterdam Tour
- 7th, (Netherlands) Dutch National Road Race Championships

2003

- 2nd, (Netherlands) Dutch National Road Race Championships
- 5th, Ronde van Gelderland

2004

- 31st, Holland Ladies Tour
- 7th, Ronde van Gelderland

2005

- 15th, Sparkassen Giro Bochum
- 21st, (Netherlands) Dutch National Road Race Championships

2006

- 39th, Holland Ladies Tour
- 31st, RaboSter Zeeuwsche Eilanden
- 11th, Omloop Het Volk

2007

- 50th, Tour de Bretagne Féminin
- 16th, (Netherlands) Dutch National Road Race Championships
- 18th, Omloop door Middag-Humsterland
- 9th, Ronde van Gelderland
