= 1996 UCI Road World Championships – Women's road race =

Women's Individual Road Race
1996 UCI Road World Championships

Race details
- Dates: October 1996
- Stages: 1 in (Switzerland) Lugano (SUI)
- Distance: 100.8 km (62.6 mi)
- Winning time: 02h 53' 05"

Medalists
| | Gold | (Switzerland) Barbara Heeb (SUI) |
| | Silver | (Lithuania) Rasa Polikevičiūtė (LTU) |
| | Bronze | (Canada) Linda Jackson (CAN) |

The Women's Individual Road Race at the 1996 UCI Road World Championships was held in October 1996 in Lugano, Switzerland, over a total distance of 100.8 kilometres.

== Final classification ==
| Rank | Rider | Time |
|---|---|---|
| 1st place, gold medalist(s) | Barbara Heeb (SUI) | 02:53:05 |
| 2nd place, silver medalist(s) | Rasa Polikevičiūtė (LTU) | + 00.17 |
| 3rd place, bronze medalist(s) | Linda Jackson (CAN) | + 00.37 |
| 4 | Laura Charameda (USA) | + 01:51 |
| 5 | Jolanta Polikevičiūtė (LTU) | — |
| 6 | Alessandra Cappellotto (ITA) | — |
| 7 | Jeannie Longo (FRA) | — |
| 8 | Edita Pučinskaitė (LTU) | — |
| 9 | Alexandra Koliasseva (RUS) | — |
| 10 | Catherine Marsal (FRA) | — |
| 11 | Zulfiya Zabirova (RUS) | + 01:56 |
| 12 | Hanka Kupfernagel (GER) | + 03:10 |
| 13 | Sigrid Corneo (SLO) | + 05:18 |
| 14 | Yvonne Schnorf (SUI) | + 05:30 |
| 15 | Heidi Van De Vijver (BEL) | + 06:29 |
| 16 | Valeria Cappellotto (ITA) | + 06:36 |
| 17 | Diana Rast (SUI) | + 06:49 |
| 18 | Lenka Ilavská (SVK) | + 09:00 |
| 19 | Kerstin Scheitle (GER) | + 09:01 |
| 20 | Marcia Vouets (SUI) | — |
