= Lithuania at the UCI Road World Championships =

- IOC code: LTU
- Medals: Gold 6 Silver 3 Bronze 7 Total 16

Lithuania at the UCI Road World Championships is an overview of the Lithuanian results at the UCI Road World Championships. The Lithuania competitors are selected by coaches of the Lithuanian Cycling Federation.

Prior to World War II Lithuanian cyclists been competing at the Olympics, but never started at the UCI Road World Championships. Lithuanian cyclist regularly competed at the UCI Road World Championships from 1975 under Soviet Union flag. During this period Lithuanian cyclists won two golds, five silvers and one bronze medals. Although Lithuania regained its independence in 1990, Lithuanian cyclists were allowed to compete under Lithuanian flag only from 1992. Country participated in every single world championships since.

== List of medallists ==
This is a list of all Lithuanian medals (including elite, amateur, under-23 and junior races) under Lithuanian flag.

| Medal | Championship | Name | Event |
|---|---|---|---|
| Gold | (Ecuador) 1994 Quito | Diana Žiliūtė | Women's junior road race |
| Silver | (Italy) 1994 Agrigento | Jolanta Polikevičiūtė; Rasa Polikevičiūtė; Diana Žiliūtė; Liuda Triabaitė | Women's team time trial |
| Bronze | (Colombia) 1995 Duitama | Edita Pučinskaitė | Women's road race |
| Silver | (Switzerland) 1996 Lugano | Rasa Polikevičiūtė | Women's road race |
| Gold | (Netherlands) 1998 Valkenburg | Diana Žiliūtė | Women's road race |
| Gold | (Italy) 1999 Treviso | Edita Pučinskaitė | Women's road race |
| Bronze | (Italy) 1999 Treviso | Diana Žiliūtė | Women's road race |
| Bronze | (Italy) 1999 Treviso | Edita Pučinskaitė | Women's time trial |
| Bronze | (France) 2000 Plouay | Rasa Polikevičiūtė | Women's time trial |
| Gold | (Portugal) 2001 Lisbon | Rasa Polikevičiūtė | Women's road race |
| Silver | (Portugal) 2001 Lisbon | Edita Pučinskaitė | Women's road race |
| Bronze | (Portugal) 2001 Lisbon | Diana Elmentaitė | Women's Junior Time Trial |
| Gold | (Belgium) 2002 Limburg | Tomas Vaitkus | Men's under-23 time trial |
| Bronze | (Austria) 2005 Oberwart | Rasa Leleivytė | Women's junior road race |
| Gold | (Belgium) 2006 Stavelot | Rasa Leleivytė | Women's junior road race |
| Bronze | (United States) 2015 Richmond | Ramūnas Navardauskas | Men's road race |

=== Medals by discipline ===
Updated after 2020 UCI Road World Championships

| Event | Gold | Silver | Bronze | Total | Rank |
| Women's road race | 3 | 2 | 2 | 7 | 9th |
| Women's junior road race | 2 | 0 | 1 | 3 | |
| Men's under-23 road race | 1 | 0 | 0 | 1 | |
| Women's team time trial | 0 | 1 | 0 | 1 | |
| Women's time trial | 0 | 0 | 2 | 2 | 15th |
| Men's road race | 0 | 0 | 1 | 1 | 21st |
| Women's junior time trial | 0 | 0 | 1 | 1 | |
| Total | 6 | 3 | 7 | 16 | |
