= Camilla Larsson =

Swedish cyclist

Personal information
- Born: 31 January 1975 (age 51) Sweden

Cycling career
- Sport: Cycling
- Discipline: Road cycling

Professional team
- 2005: Buitenpoort - Flexpoint Team

Camilla Larsson (born 31 January 1975) is a road cyclist from Sweden. She represented her nation at the 2004 Summer Olympics. She also rode at the 2004 UCI Road World Championships.
