= Aleksandra Zabrocka =

Polish cyclist

Personal information
- Born: 27 June 1984 (age 42) Poland

Cycling career
- Sport: Cycling
- Disciplines: Road cycling, Cyclo cross

Aleksandra Zabrocka (born 27 June 1984) is a cyclo cross rider and road cyclist from Poland. She represented her nation at the 2004 UCI Road World Championships.
