= Annie Gariepy =

Canadian cyclist

Personal information
- Born: May 12, 1975 (age 51) Bromont, Quebec, Canada

Cycling career
- Sport: Cycling
- Role: Rider

Professional teams
- ?-2002: Auto Trader
- 2002-?: Trek More
Medal record
Commonwealth Games
Bronze medal – third place	1998 Games	Women's 24km points race

Annie Gariepy (born May 12, 1975 in Bromont, Québec) was a member of the Canadian cycling team and she cycled for the American team Auto Trader. Gariepy was the only Canadian on the team, with her teammates including Sarah Ulmer, Susie Pryde, Kim Smith and WFP Shuster. She left Team Auto Trader at the beginning of 2002 when she passed over to team Trek More.

Gariepy underwent a complete rebuilding of the knee in May 2001 and that it had carried out a return to the competition at the Great Female Price of Quebec in August 2001. She won a bronze for Women's 24 km Points Race at the 1998 Commonwealth Games.
