= Susy Pryde =

New Zealand cyclist

Personal information
- Full name: Susannah Kate Pryde
- Born: 15 October 1973 (age 53) Waipukurau, New Zealand

Cycling career
- Sport: Cycling
- Current team: Retired
- Disciplines: Cross country road racing
- Role: Rider
Medal record
Representing New Zealand
Women's cycling
Commonwealth Games
Silver medal – second place	1998 Kuala Lumpur	Road Race
Silver medal – second place	2002 Manchester	Cross Country

Susannah Kate Pryde (born 15 October 1973 in Waipukurau, New Zealand) is a New Zealand cyclist, who won a silver medal for New Zealand at the 1998 Commonwealth Games in the women's road race. At the 2002 Commonwealth Games she again won a silver medal in the cross country discipline.

Pryde also competed for New Zealand in both the 1996 Summer Olympics and the 2000 Summer Olympics.

She rode the world road race championship four times finishing 16th in 1997 and 1999. She won the New Zealand National Road Race Championships in 1998. In 1998, she won Berkeley Hills Road Race, a USA Cycling sanctioned event in Northern California and the oldest continuously running bicycle road race in the United States.

Since retiring from cycling around 2003, she has continued some cycling coaching/mentoring work, including working with students at the high-school level.
