= Tatiana Shishkova =

Moldovan cyclist

Personal information
- Born: Moldova

Cycling career
- Sport: Cycling
- Discipline: Road cycling

Tatiana Shishkova is a road cyclist from Moldova and Russia. She represented Moldova at the 2004 UCI Road World Championships and Russia at the 2006 UCI Road World Championships.
