= AA Drink–leontien.nl =

Cycling team based in the Netherlands

Team information
- UCI code: LNL
- Registered: Netherlands
- Founded: 2005
- Disbanded: 2012
- Disciplines: Road, Track, Cyclo-cross
- Status: UCI Women's Team
- Bicycles: Cervélo

Key personnel
- General manager: Michael Zijlaard
- Team managers: Danny Stam; Bram Sevens

Team name history
- 2005 2006–2008 2009–2010 2011–2012: Van Bemmelen–AA Drink (BAA); AA-Drink Cycling Team (AAD); Leontien.nl (LNL); AA Drink–leontien.nl (LNL)
AA Drink–leontien.nl jersey
Jersey

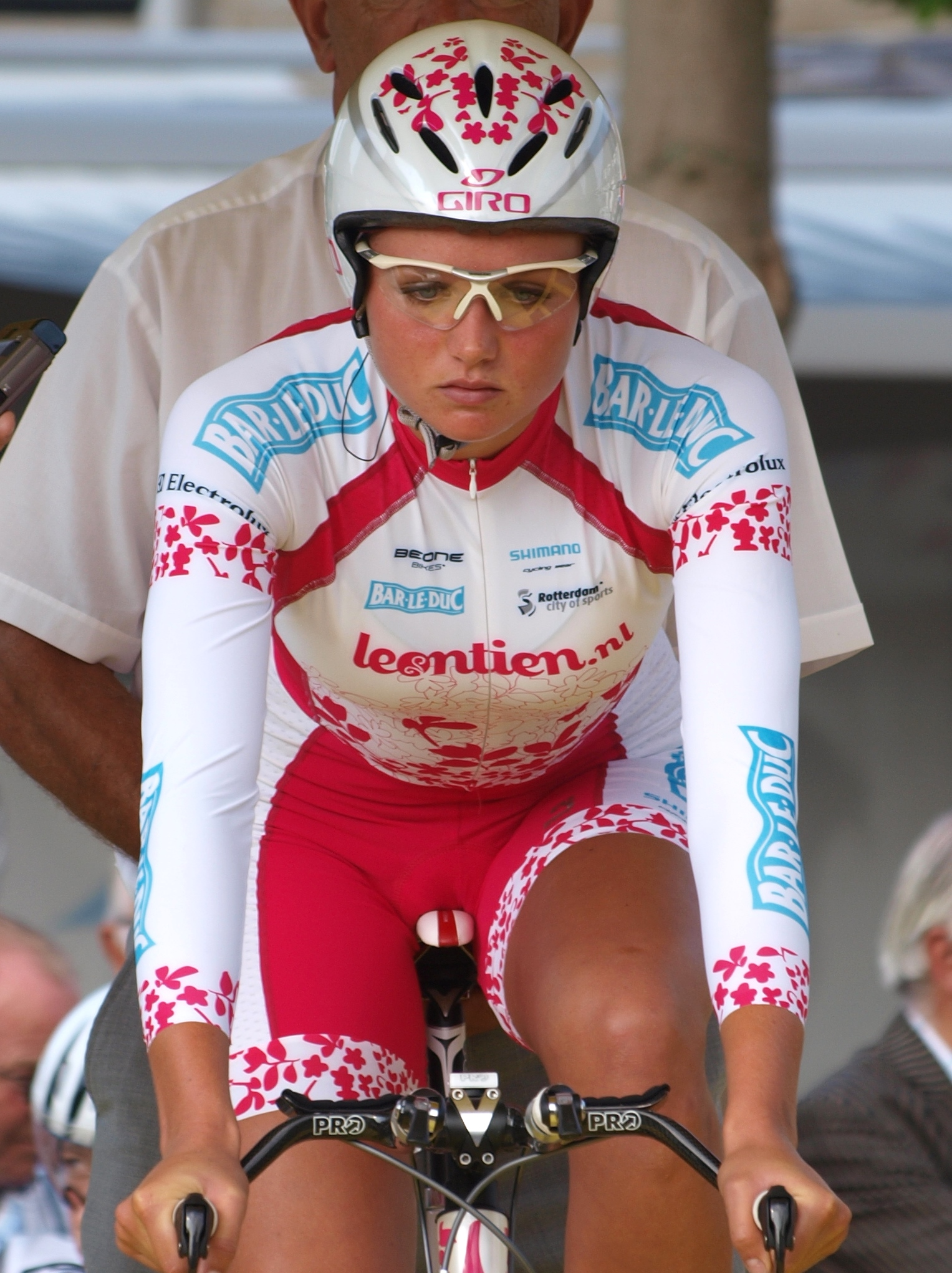
Chantal Blaak concentrating at the start of a time trial in 2009

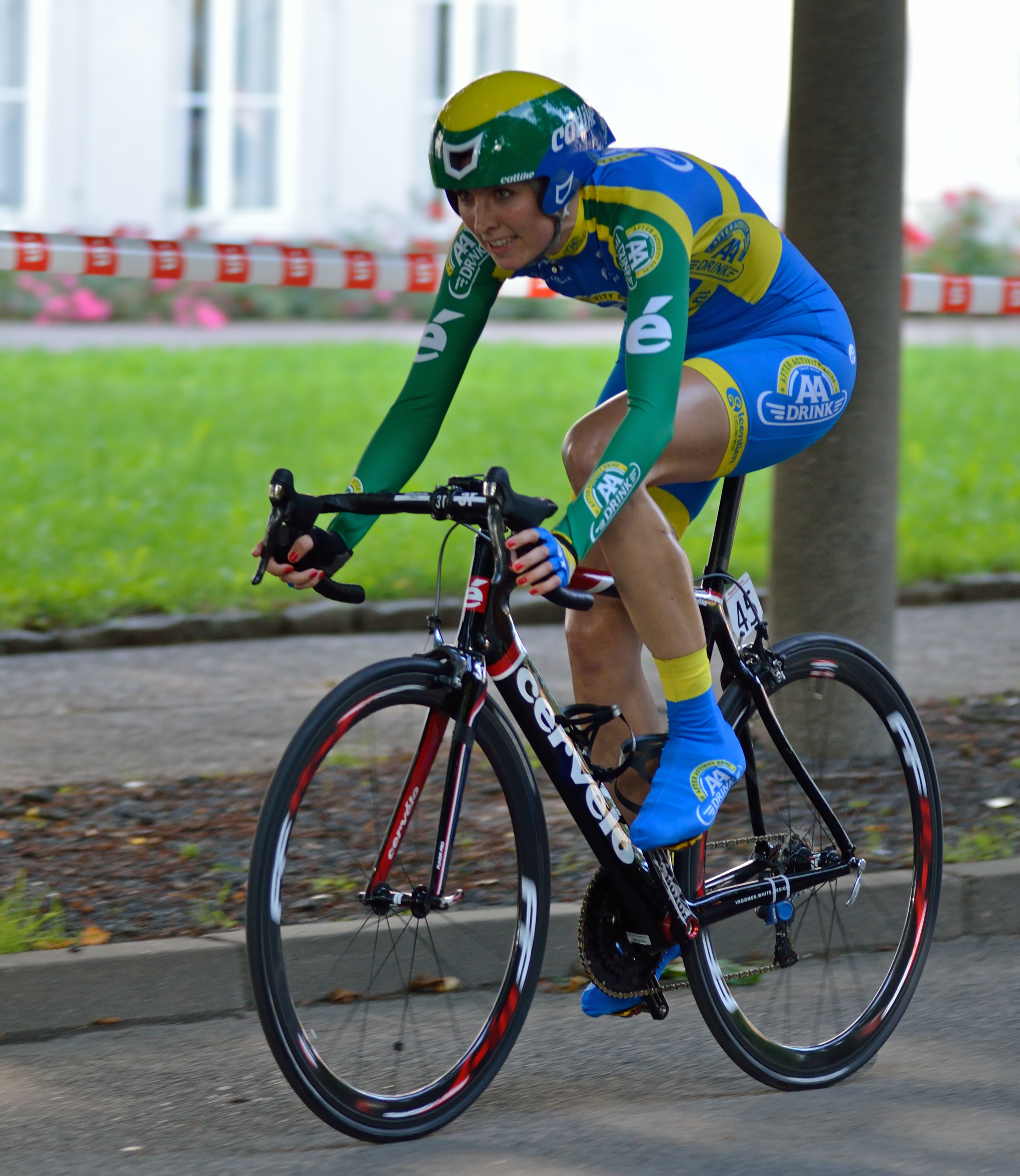
Marijn de Vries in 2012

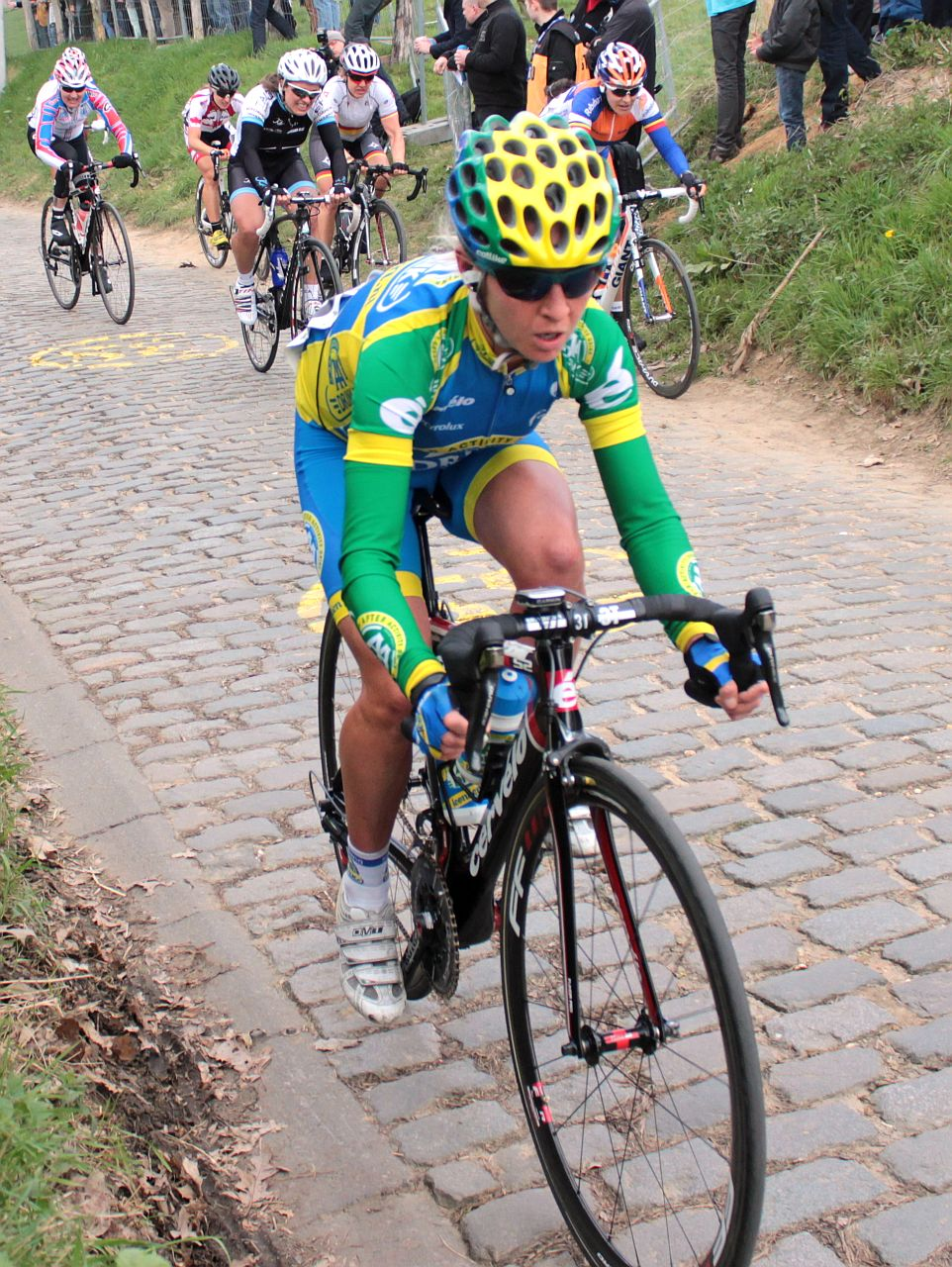
Emma Pooley in 2012

AA Drink–leontien.nl was a cycling team based in the Netherlands. The title sponsors were AA Drink ('after activity drink'), a Dutch sports drinks brand owned by United Soft Drinks, and leontien.nl, a women's health and fitness website associated with former champion cyclist Leontien van Moorsel, whose husband Michael Zijlaard was the team manager.

In August 2012, Zijlaard informed the riders and staff that the team would disband at the end of the 2012 racing season, as AA Drink were not extending their sponsorship beyond 2012 and he and van Moorsel had decided not to seek a new sponsor.

== Team rosters ==
2012

The 2012 women's road racing team included six riders who were formerly members of the disbanded Garmin–Cervélo women's team: British cyclists Emma Pooley, Lizzie Armitstead, Sharon Laws and Lucy Martin, Belgian Jessie Daams and Australian Carla Ryan.

Ages as of 1 January 2012.

Rider	Date of birth
Lizzie Armitstead (GBR)	18 December 1988 (aged 23)
Chantal Blaak (NED)	22 October 1989 (aged 22)
Lucinda Brand (NED)	2 July 1989 (aged 22)
Jessie Daams (BEL)	28 May 1990 (aged 21)
Marijn de Vries (NED)	19 November 1978 (aged 33)
Sharon Laws (GBR)	7 July 1974 (aged 37)
Lucy Martin (GBR)	5 May 1990 (aged 21)
Shelley Olds (USA)	30 September 1980 (aged 31)

Rider	Date of birth
Madelene Olsson (SWE)	14 November 1982 (aged 29)
Emma Pooley (GBR)	3 October 1982 (aged 29)
Carla Ryan (AUS)	21 September 1985 (aged 26)
Isabelle Söderberg (SWE)	28 May 1989 (aged 22)
Marieke van Nek (NED)	14 November 1988 (aged 23)
Marieke van Wanroij (NED)	5 July 1979 (aged 32)
Kirsten Wild (NED)	15 October 1982 (aged 29)

2011

Ages as of 1 January 2011.

Rider	Date of birth
Chantal Blaak (NED)	October 22, 1989 (aged 21)
Lucinda Brand (NED)	July 2, 1989 (aged 21)
Eline De Roover (BEL)	April 4, 1992 (aged 18)
Marlen Jöhrend (GER)	January 2, 1986 (aged 24)
Willy Kanis (NED)	July 27, 1984 (aged 26)
Monique van de Ree (NED)	March 2, 1988 (aged 22)
Daphny van den Brand (NED)	April 6, 1978 (aged 32)
Irene van den Broek (NED)	August 26, 1980 (aged 30)

Rider	Date of birth
Heleen van Vliet (NED)	September 17, 1982 (aged 28)
Josien van Wingerden (NED)	September 22, 1987 (aged 23)
Linda Villumsen (NZL)	April 9, 1985 (aged 25)
Marijn de Vries (NED)	November 19, 1978 (aged 32)
Kirsten Wild (NED)	October 15, 1982 (aged 28)
Anne de Wildt (Until 22/6) (NED)
Trixi Worrack (GER)	September 28, 1981 (aged 29)

== Major wins ==
2005
Stage 1 Geelong Tour, Nathalie Bates
Omloop Door Middag-Humsterland WE, Adrie Visser
Overall New Zealand, Suzanne de Goede
Overall Novilon Eurocup Ronde van Drenthe, Suzanne de Goede

Stages 1 & 2, Suzanne de Goede

Ronde van Gelderland, Suzanne de Goede
Rabobank Ster Zeeuwsche Eilanden, Suzanne de Goede
Overall International Thüringen Rundfahrt der Frauen, Theresa Senff

Stage 3, Angela Brodtka-Hennig
Stage 5, Theresa Senff

Sparkassen Giro Bochum, Angela Brodtka-Hennig
Stage 1b Giro della Toscana Int. Femminile – Memorial Michela Fanini, Suzanne de Goede
2006
Omloop het Nieuwsblad, Suzanne de Goede
Omloop Door Middag-Humsterland WE, Kirsten Wild
Overall Rabobank Ster Zeeuwsche Eilanden, Kirsten Wild

Stages 2 & 3, Kirsten Wild

Overall Tour de Feminin – Krasna Lipa, Theresa Senff

Stage 1, Theresa Senff

Stage 1 International Thüringen Rundfahrt der Frauen, Angela Brodtka-Hennig
Profronde van Surhuisterveen WE, Adrie Visser
Holland Hills Classic, Theresa Senff
Stage 3 Euregio Ladies Tour, Sandra Missbach
2007
Overall Tour de Pologne Feminin, Kirsten Wild

Stages 2, 3 & 4, Kirsten Wild

Stage 3 BrainWash Ladies Tour, Kirsten Wild
2008
Omloop Het Nieuwsblad WE, Kirsten Wild
Omloop van Borsele WE, Kirsten Wild
Therme kasseienomloop, Kirsten Wild
Stage 1 Rabobank Ster Zeeuwsche Eilanden, Kirsten Wild
Stage 2 Tour Féminin en Limousin, Paulina Brzeźna
Profronde van Surhuisterveen WE, Kirsten Wild
Profronde van Oostvoorne, Chantal Blaak
Overall Trophée d'Or Féminin, Emma Johansson

Stage 5, Emma Johansson

Grand Prix de France, Ludivine Henrion
2009
Dolmans Heuvelland Classic, Lucinda Brand
Stage 5 Gracia–Orlová, Andrea Bosman
Therme kasseienomloop, Chantal Blaak
Stage 3 Rabobank Ster Zeeuwsche Eilanden, Andrea Bosman
2010
Gouden Pijl Emmen, Andrea Bosman
2011
(gold) Track Cycling World Cup in Astana – team pursuit, Kirsten Wild (with Ellen van Dijk and Amy Pieters)
Omloop van Borsele, Kirsten Wild
Stage 1 Rabobank Ster Zeeuwsche Eilanden, Chantal Blaak
Erpe – Mere, Chantal Blaak
Stage 5 Giro della Toscana Int. Femminile – Memorial Michela Fanini, Trixi Worrack
2012
Stages 1 & 3, Kirsten Wild
Omloop van het Hageland – Tielt-Winge, Lizzie Armitstead
Gent – Wevelgem WE, Lizzie Armitstead
Stage 4a Energiewacht Tour, Kirsten Wild
Tour of Chongming Island World Cup, Shelley Olds-Evans
Durango-Durango Emakumeen Saria, Emma Pooley
Overall Rabobank Ster Zeeuwsche Eilanden, Kirsten Wild

Stage 3, Kirsten Wild

Stage 6 Giro d'Italia Femminile, Shelley Olds-Evans
Dutch National Record, Olympic Games: London, Team pursuit: 3:20.013, Kirsten Wild (with Ellen van Dijk and Vera Koedooder)
Stage 2 Tour de Feminin – Krasna Lipa, Kirsten Wild
Stage 3 Tour de Feminin – Krasna Lipa, Lucinda Brand
Stage 3 Tour Féminin en Limousin, Lucinda Brand
Stage 6 International Thüringen Rundfahrt der Frauen, Jessie Daams
Stage 2 Route de France Féminine, Lucinda Brand
Stages 1 & 2 Lotto–Decca Tour, Kirsten Wild
Overall Tour Cycliste Féminin International Ardèche, Emma Pooley

Stages 3 & 5, Emma Pooley
Stage 6, Carla Ryan

Stage 3 BrainWash Ladies Tour, Kirsten Wild

== National and continental champions ==
2005
Dutch National Cyclocross Championships, Daphny van den Brand
Australian National Track Championships (Individual pursuit), Kate Bates
Australian National Track Championships (Scratch race), Kate Bates
Australian U23 National Track Championships (Scratch race), Kate Bates
Australian National Track Championships (Points race), Kate Bates
Dutch National Time Trial Championships, Suzanne de Goede
Dutch National Track Championships (Scratch race), Adrie Visser
Dutch National Track Championships (Individual pursuit), Adrie Visser
Dutch Junior National Track Championships (Individual pursuit), Maxime Groenewegen
Dutch National Track Championships (Points race), Adrie Visser
Dutch Junior National Track Championships (Points race), Maxime Groenewegen
2006
European U23 Track Championships (Points race), Marlijn Binnendijk
Dutch National Track Championships (Scratch race), Adrie Visser
Dutch National Track Championships (Points race), Adrie Visser
2007
Dutch Road Race Championship, Marlijn Binnendijk
European U23 Track Championships (Points race), Marlijn Binnendijk
Belgian Time Trial Championship, An Van Rie
2008
Swedish Time Trial Championship, Emma Johansson
Polish Road Race Championship, Paulina Brzeźna
Dutch National Track Championships (Scratch race), Kirsten Wild
2009
Dutch National Team Time Trial Championships, Suzanne van Veen, Chantal Blaak & Marit Huisman
2010
Dutch National Track Championships (500m Time Trial), Willy Kanis
Dutch National Track Championships (Sprint), Willy Kanis
Dutch National Track Championships (Keirin), Willy Kanis
2011
Dutch National Track Championships (Points race), Kirsten Wild
Dutch National Track Championships (Scratch), Kirsten Wild
Dutch National Track Championships (Madison), Kirsten Wild (together with Ellen van Dijk)
2012
Dutch National Track Championships (Omnium), Kirsten Wild
British National Road Race Championships, Sharon Laws
Dutch National Track Championships (Points race), Kirsten Wild
