= United Soft Drinks =

Producer of soft drinks based in Utrecht, Netherlands

United Soft Drinks is a producer of soft drinks based in Utrecht in the Netherlands. Their best known-brands are AA Drink, a line of sport drinks, Bar-le-Duc, a line of mineral waters, London, a line of bitter lemonades, Raak, a line of fruit syrups, and the product Kindercola. The company also produces a number of private label lemonades.
