= Maria Lucilene Silva =

Brazilian cyclist

Personal information
- Born: Brazil

Cycling career
- Sport: Cycling
- Discipline: Road cycling

Maria Lucilene Silva is a road cyclist from Brazil. She represented her nation at the 2004 UCI Road World Championships.
