= Noemi Cantele =

Italian cyclist (born 1981)

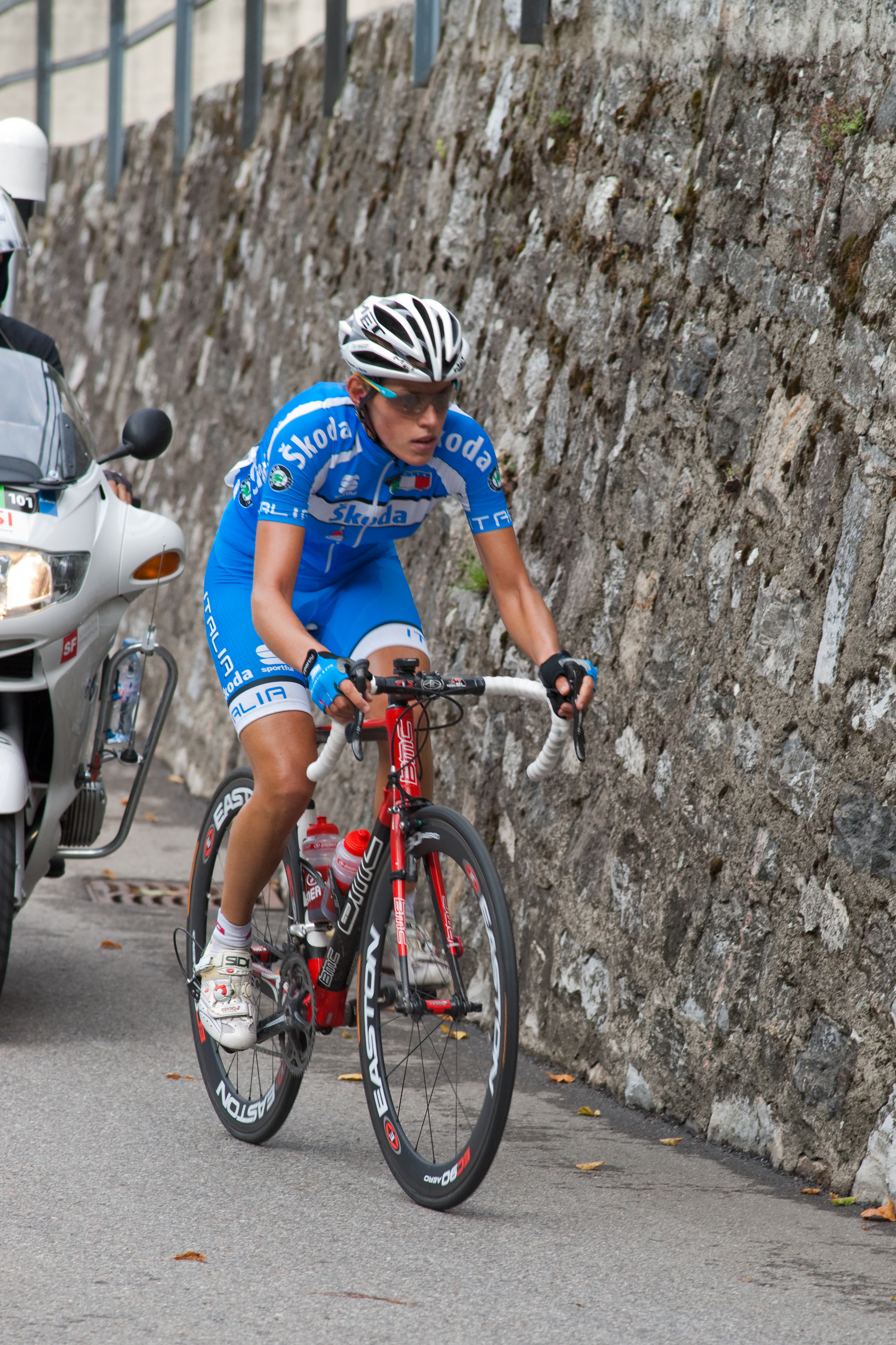

Personal information
- Full name: Noemi Cantele
- Born: 17 July 1981 (age 45) Varese, Italy
- Height: 1.71 m (5 ft 7 in)
- Weight: 58 kg (128 lb)

Cycling career
- Sport: Cycling
- Current team: Be Pink
- Discipline: Road
- Role: Rider
- Rider type: All-rounder

Professional teams
- 2005–9: Bigla Cycling Team
- 2010: Team HTC-Columbia Women
- 2011: Garmin–Cervélo
- 2012: Be Pink
Medal record
Representing Italy
Women's road cycling
World Championships
| Silver medal – second place | 2009 Mendrisio | Time trial |
| Bronze medal – third place | 2009 Mendrisio | Road Race |

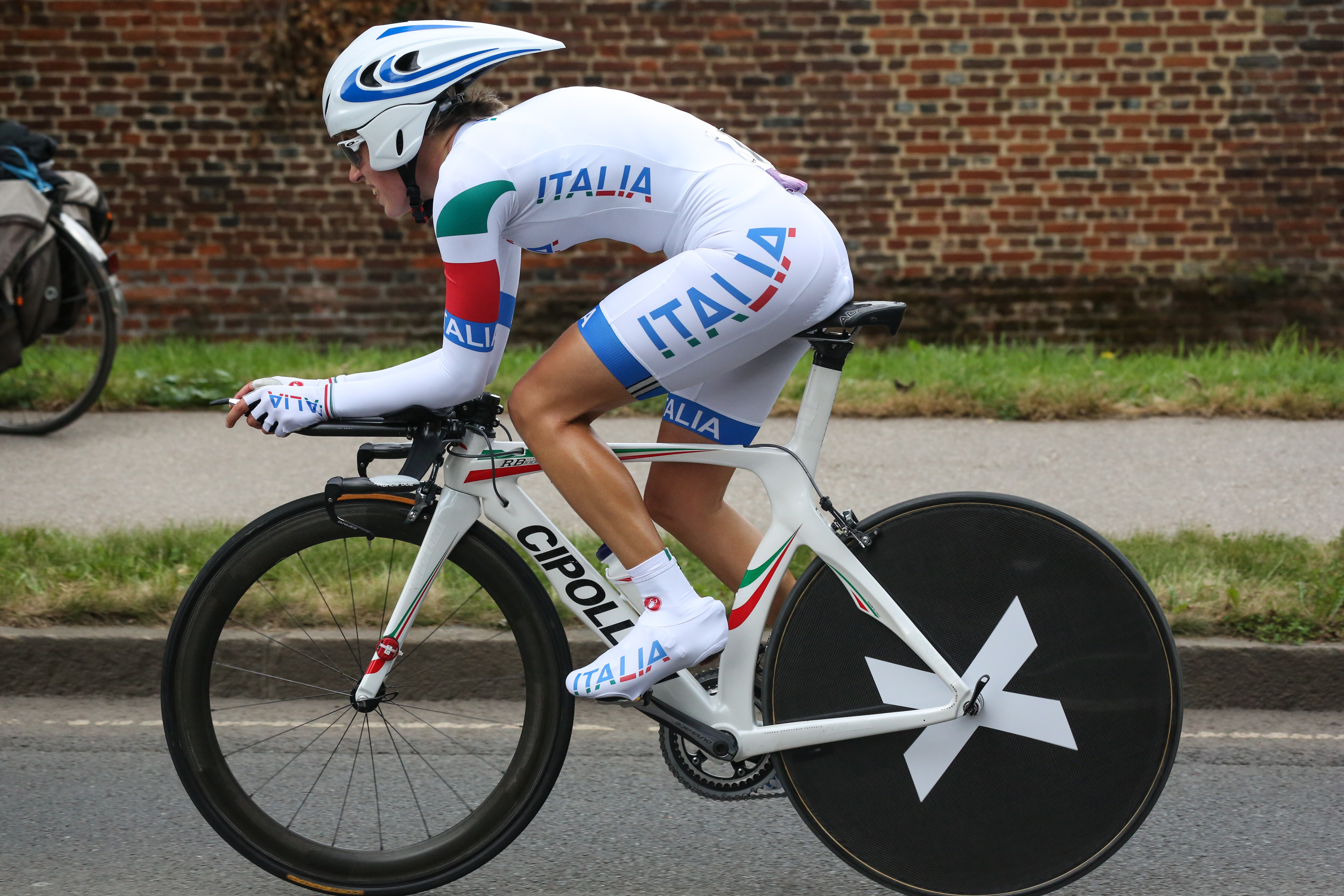
Noemi Cantele competing in the 2012 Olympics time trial in London

Noemi Cantele (born 17 July 1981) is a professional road bicycle racer. In 2012, she rides for the Be Pink team in women's elite professional events on the National Racing Calendar and UCI Women's World Cup. She competed at the 2012 Summer Olympics in the Women's road race and the Women's time trial.

== Major results ==
2006
1st stage 2a, 4a and 6 Giro della Toscana Int. Femminile – Memorial Michela Fanini
2009
1st Emakumeen Saria
1st GP Brissago
1st Stage 5, Giro d'Italia Femminile
1st Italian National Championships ITT
2nd UCI Road World Championships – Women's time trial
2nd Omloop Het Nieuwsblad
3rd UCI Road Race World Championships
2010 – Team HTC-Columbia 2010 season
3rd overall, Giro della Toscana Int. Femminile – Memorial Michela Fanini

1st Stage 3

3rd overall, Thüringen Rundfahrt der Frauen
2011
1st Italian National Championships road race
1st Italian National Championships ITT
2012
1st GP El Salvador
1st Stage 1, Vuelta El Salvador
2nd 2012 Le Samyn des Dames
1st GP Liberazione
1st Stage 1, Giro del Trentino Alto Adige - Südtirol
