= Manon Jutras =

Canadian cyclist (born 1967)

Personal information
- Born: 25 November 1967 (age 58) Canada

Cycling career
- Sport: Cycling
- Discipline: Road cycling

Professional team
- 2014: Team S.A.T.S.

Manon Jutras (born 25 November 1967) is a road cyclist from Canada. She represented her nation at the 2004 Summer Olympics. She also rode at the 2003 and 2004 UCI Road World Championships.
