= Mirjam Melchers =

Dutch cyclist (born 1975)

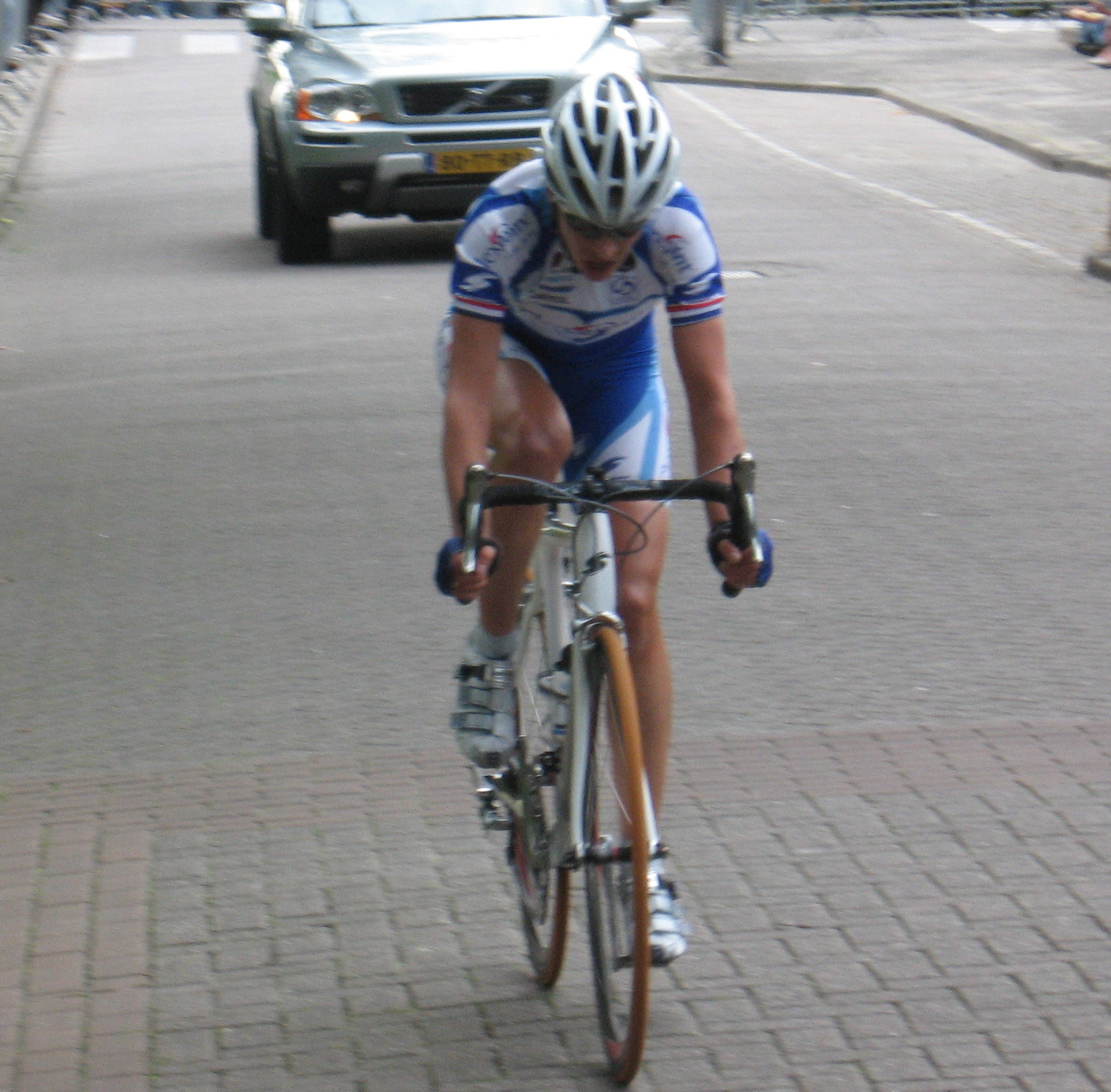
- Melchers in 2007

Personal information
- Full name: Maria Wilhelmina Johanna Melchers-Van Poppel
- Born: 26 September 1975 (age 51) Arnhem, the Netherlands
- Height: 1.75 m (5 ft 9 in)
- Weight: 59 kg (130 lb)

Cycling career
- Sport: Cycling
- Discipline: Road
- Role: Rider
- Rider type: Allround

Professional teams
- 1998–2002: Rabobank
- 2001–2001: Acca Due O-Lorena Camicie
- 2004–2004: Farm Frites–Hartoli
- 2005–2009: Team Flexpoint
- 2010: Cervélo TestTeam

Major wins
- Primavera Rosa World Cup (2002); Grande Boucle, 3 stages Holland Ladies Tour (2000, 2004); Giro dell Alto Adige (2001); Ronde van Vlaanderen (2005, 2006); Ster van Walcheren (2003); National Champion (2000); Castilla y Leon (2003)
Medal record
Representing Netherlands
Women's road cycling
World Championships
Silver medal – second place	2003	Road race
Women's cyclo-cross
UCI Cyclo-cross World Championships
Bronze medal – third place	2005	Women elite race

Maria Wilhelmina Johanna "Mirjam" Melchers-Van Poppel (born 26 September 1975 in Arnhem, Gelderland) is a female former racing cyclist from the Netherlands, married to former sprinter Jean-Paul van Poppel. She was one of the leading cyclists in the world, having held the UCI number one ranking as well as winning highly rated races. She was a one-day specialist but has managed smaller stage races.

In 2003, she won the GP Feminas Castilla y Leon round of the World Cup and finished third overall in the series behind Nicole Cooke and German sprinter Regina Schleicher. Melchers also finished first in the Damesronde van Drenthe and the Emakumeen Bira, before bringing her season to a close with a silver medal at the world championship road race in Hamilton, Ontario, Canada.

On 7 September 2006 Melchers crashed during the third stage of the Euregio Tour. She broke her pelvis, a hip and her jaw.

== Major results ==
Note: Beginning in 1997, the Union Cycliste Internationale awarded points to riders based on performances in races. Races were classified in categories. Although the system has evolved, major stage races are generally category 1 (strongest) and category 2. In the listings below, these categories, where known, are in parentheses. GC stands for General classification.

=== Road ===
1998
1st Omloop der Groene Gemeente
1st Stage 4 Holland Ladies Tour
1st Vlijmen Criterium

1999
1st Stage 5 Holland Ladies Tour
2nd Overall Greenery International
National Championship

2nd Road Race
2nd Time Trial

2nd Ronde van Drenthe
3rd Flevotour

2000
1st Overall Holland Ladies Tour

1st Stage 3

1st Road Race, National Road Championships
1st Harderwijk Road Race
1st Haarsteeg Criterium
1st Geldrop Criterium
1st Stage 2 Grande Boucle Féminine Internationale
2nd Overall Tour de l'Aude Cycliste Féminin
2nd Le Critérium International Féminin De Lachine
3rd Overall UCI Road World Cup
3rd Overall Thüringen-Rundfahrt der Frauen
3rd GP de Plouay
3rd Canberra Women's Classic
3rd Embrach
5th Road Race, UCI Road World Championships

2001
1st Overall Thüringen-Rundfahrt der Frauen

1st Stages 1 & 2

1st Westerbeek Criterium
2nd Overall UCI Road World Cup
2nd Primavera Rosa
2nd Amstel Gold Race
2nd GP de Plouay
2nd Hamilton City Criterium
2nd Canberra Women's Classic
5th Road Race, UCI Road World Championships
8th UCI Road World Championships – Women's time trial

2002
1st Primavera Rosa
1st Oud-Vossemeer Criterium
2nd Overall UCI Road World Cup
2nd Overall Holland Ladies Tour

1st Stage 7

2nd Overall Tour de Snowy

1st Stage 1

2nd Amstel Gold Race
2nd Rotterdam Airport Derny
3rd Overall Thüringen-Rundfahrt der Frauen

1st Prologue

3rd Road Race, National Road Championships
3rd GP Castilla y Leon
3rd Canberra Women's Classic
3rd Enkhuizen Criterium

2003
1st Overall Emakumeen Euskal Bira
1st Overall RaboSter Zeeuwsche Eilanden

1st Stage 1

1st Overall Ronde van Drenthe

1st Stage 2

1st Ronde van het Ronostrand
1st Oud-Gastel
1st GP Castilla y Leon
1st Oud-Vossemeer
1st Haarsteeg
1st GP Montferland
1st Stage 3 (TTT) Holland Ladies Tour
2nd Overall Vuelta Castilla y Leon
2nd Road Race, UCI Road World Championships
2nd Rotterdam Airport Derny
2nd Lekkerkerk
3rd Overall UCI Road World Cup
3rd Time Trial, National Road Championships
3rd GP de Plouay
3rd Janet Memorial

2004
1st Time Trial, National Road Championships
1st Overall Vuelta Castilla y Leon

1st Stage 3

1st Overall Holland Ladies Tour

1st Stages 1b (TTT) & 2

1st Holland Hills Classic
1st Luk Challenge
1st Roosendaal Criterium
1st Oostvoorne Criterium
2nd Overall Emakumeen Euskal Bira
2nd Primavera Rosa
2nd Ronde van Gelderland
2nd GP de Plouay
2nd Made Criterium
3rd Overall Thüringen-Rundfahrt der Frauen
3rd GP Castilla y Leon
3rd Omloop van Borsele
6th Road Race, Olympic Games
6th UCI Road World Championships – Women's time trial
9th Road Race, UCI Road World Championships

2005
1st Overall RaboSter Zeeuwsche Eilanden

1st Stage 3

1st Tour of Flanders Women
1st Emakumeen Saria
1st Stage 5 Giro d'Italia Femminile
1st Lekkerkerk Criterium
1st Boxmeer Criterium
1st Roosendaal Criterium
1st Oostvoorne Criterium
2nd Luk Challenge
3rd UCI Cyclo-cross World Championships
3rd Overall Emakumeen Euskal Bira
3rd Overall Holland Ladies Tour

1st Stage 4b (TTT)

3rd Overall Memorial Michela Fanini

1st Prologue

3rd Overall UCI Road World Cup
3rd Time Trial, National Road Championships
3rd Coupe du Monde Cycliste Féminine de Montréal
3rd Sparkassen Giro Bochum
7th UCI Road World Championships – Women's time trial

2006
1st Tour of Flanders Women
1st Stage 1 (TTT) Tour de l'Aude Cycliste Féminin
2nd Omloop Het Volk
3rd Ronde van Gelderland
3rd Oud-Vossemeer Criterium

2007
1st GP Gerrie Knetemann
1st Maastricht, Omnium
1st Profronde van Pijnacker
1st Stage 4b Emakumeen Euskal Bira
2nd Emakumeen Saria
2nd Oostvoorne Criterium
3rd Overall RaboSter Zeeuwsche Eilanden
3rd Time Trial, National Road Championships
3rd Chrono Champenois – Trophée Européen
3rd Harderwijk Criterium

2008
National Road Championships

1st Time Trial
2nd Road Race

1st Stage 2 (TTT) Tour de l'Aude Cycliste Féminin
1st Prologue Giro d'Italia Femminile
3rd Berner Rundfahrt
5th Chrono Champenois – Trophée Européen

2009
1st GP Groenendaal
3rd Open de Suède Vårgårda TTT
3rd Omloop van Stadshagen
5th Overall Ladies Tour of Qatar
7th Time Trial, National Road Championships
7th Omloop Het Nieuwsblad
9th RaboSter Zeeuwsche Eilanden

2010
7th Omloop Het Nieuwsblad
9th Heuvelland Classic

=== Cyclo-cross ===
2003
1st Amersfoort, Cyclo-cross
1st Boxtel, Cyclo-cross
1st Kerstveldrit om d'n Ouwe Brandtoren
2nd Eindhoven, Cyclo-cross

2004
1st National Cyclo-cross Championships
1st Woerden, Cyclo-cross
1st Kerstveldrit om d'n Ouwe Brandtoren
3rd Moergestel, Cyclo-cross
4th Kersttrofee
7th Trofeo Mamma & Papà Guerciotti

2005
1st GP Adri van der Poel
1st Amersfoort, Cyclo-cross
2nd Bakel, Cyclo-cross
2nd Veldhoven, Cyclo-cross
3rd National Cyclo-cross Championships
3rd Vlaamse Druivencross
3rd Azencross
4th Nommay, Cyclo-cross
5th Kersttrofee
5th Hooglede, Cyclo-cross

2006
3rd GP Adri van der Poel
4th UCI Cyclo-cross World Championships
4th Liévin, Cyclo-cross

2007
1st Amersfoort, Cyclo-cross
2nd Gieten, Cyclo-cross
2nd Huijbergen, Cyclo-cross
2nd Azencross
3rd Eerde, Cyclo-cross
7th Kersttrofee
10th Duinencross

2008
1st National Cyclo-cross Championships
1st Amersfoort, Cyclo-cross
6th UCI Cyclo-cross World Championships
7th GP Adri van der Poel

2009
2nd National Cyclo-cross Championships
8th UCI Cyclo-cross World Championships

== See also ==
- List of Dutch Olympic cyclists
