= Kimberly Smith (cyclist) =

American cyclist (born 1968)

Personal information
- Full name: Kimberly Smith
- Born: January 28, 1968 (age 58) United States

Cycling career
- Sport: Cycling
- Current team: Retired
- Discipline: Road
- Role: Rider

Kimberly Smith (born January 28, 1968) is a retired female professional cyclist from the United States. She was part of the Timex Women's Professional Cycling Team in the year 2000. In year 2001, she joined the AutoTrader.com Cycling team.
