= Theresa Senff =

German cyclist (born 1982)

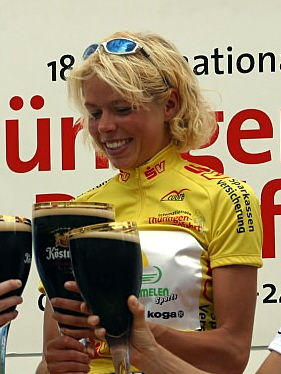
- Senff after winning the 2005 Thüringen Rundfahrt

Personal information
- Born: 2 February 1982 (age 44) Arnstadt, Bezirk Erfurt, East Germany

Cycling career
- Sport: Cycling
- Discipline: Road cycling

Professional teams
- 2001: Teag-Euregio
- 2005–2006: AA-Drink Cycling Team
- 2007: Team Getränke Hoffmann
- 2008: AA Drink Cycling Team

Theresa Senff (born 2 February 1982) is a road cyclist from Germany. She represented her nation at the 2003, 2004, 2005 and 2006 UCI Road World Championships.
