= Ster Zeeuwsche Eilanden =

Dutch women's road bicycle stage race

Race details
- Date: June
- Region: Zeeland, Netherlands
- Discipline: Road
- Web site: www.sterze.nl

History
- First edition: 1998
- Editions: 15 (as of 2014)
- First winner: Valentina Polkhanova (RUS)
- Most recent: Kirsten Wild (NED)

The Ster Zeeuwsche Eilanden also known as Rabo Ster Zeeuwsche Eilanden due to former sponsorships reasons is a 3 days elite women's road bicycle stage race held in the province of Zeeland, Netherlands. The race was established in 1998 and was named in the first years Ster van Walcheren. The race is rated by the UCI as a 2.2 category race. The 2013 and 2014 editions were cancelled due to financial reasons.

== Past winners ==
Year	First	Second	Third
1998	Valentina Polkhanova (RUS)	Chantal Beltman (NED)	Marielle van Scheppingen (NED)
1999	Hanka Kupfernagel (GER)	Debby Mansveld (NED)	Ghita Beltman (NED)
2000	Hanka Kupfernagel (GER)	Edith Klep-Moerenhout (NED)	Sandra Rombouts (NED)
2001	Lada Kozlíková (CZE)	Andrea Bosman (NED)	Anouska van der Zee (NED)
2002	Leontien van Moorsel (NED)	Vera Koedooder (NED)	Frances Newstead (GBR)
2003	Mirjam Melchers (NED)	Loes Gunnewijk (NED)	Vera Koedooder (NED)
2004	Chantal Beltman (NED)	Loes Gunnewijk (NED)	Katherine Bates (AUS)
2005	Mirjam Melchers (NED)	Loes Gunnewijk (NED)	Chantal Beltman (NED)
2006	Kirsten Wild (NED)	Marianne Vos (NED)	Linda Villumsen (DEN)
2007	Marianne Vos (NED)	Kirsten Wild (NED)	Mirjam Melchers (NED)
2008	Ina-Yoko Teutenberg (GER)	Kirsten Wild (NED)	Ellen van Dijk (NED)
2009	Ina-Yoko Teutenberg (GER)	Chantal Beltman (NED)	Linda Villumsen (DEN)
2010	Kirsten Wild (NED)	Iris Slappendel (NED)	Annemiek van Vleuten (NED)
2011	Marianne Vos (NED)	Kirsten Wild (NED)	Sarah Düster (GER)
2012	Kirsten Wild (NED)	Amy Cure (AUS)	Amy Pieters (NED)
2013	Cancelled		
2014	Cancelled		
