= Barbara Heeb =

Swiss cyclist

Personal information
- Born: 13 February 1969 (age 57) Appenzell, Switzerland

Cycling career
- Sport: Cycling
- Role: Rider

Barbara Heeb (born 13 February 1969 in Appenzell) is a Swiss road racing cyclist.

In 1996 Heeb won the world championship and finished 8th place in the road race at the Summer Olympics. She was the Swiss National Road Race champion in 1990, 1997 and 1998.

== Major results ==
1996
10th UCI Road World Championships – Women's time trial

Preceded by (Switzerland) Vreni Schneider	Swiss Sportswoman of the Year; 1996	Succeeded by (Switzerland) Martina Hingis
