= Noelia Fernández (cyclist) =

Argentine cyclist

Personal information
- Full name: Noelia Soledad Fernández
- Born: 15 March 1978 (age 48) Argentina

Cycling career
- Sport: Cycling
- Discipline: Road cycling

Noelia Soledad Fernández (born 15 March 1978) is a road cyclist from Argentina.

== Professional career ==
She represented her nation at the 2006 UCI Road World Championships.
