= Suzanne de Goede =

Dutch racing cyclist

Personal information
- Full name: Suzanne de Goede
- Born: 16 April 1984 (age 42) Zoeterwoude, Netherlands

Cycling career
- Sport: Cycling
- Discipline: Road
- Role: Rider

Professional teams
- 2006: AA-Drink Cycling Team
- 2007: T-Mobile Women
- 2008–9: Equipe Nürnberger Versicherung

Suzanne de Goede (born 16 April 1984) is a former Dutch professional racing cyclist.

== Major results ==
2000
2nd Dutch National Road Race Championships, Newcomers
2002
1st Dutch National Road Race Championships, Juniors
1st UCI World Road Race Championships, Juniors
2003
1st (Netherlands) Dutch National Road Race Championships
1st Stage 3, Holland Ladies Tour
2005
1st Wellington Tour
1st Overall Damesronde van Drenthe

1st stage 1 and stage 2

1st Ronde van Gelderland
1st Tjejtrampet
1st Stage 4, Ster Zeeuwsche Eilanden
1st (Netherlands) Dutch National Time Trial Championships
1st Stage 1b, 2006 Giro della Toscana Int. Femminile
2006
1st Omloop Het Volk
3rd Grand Prix International Dottignies
3rd Omloop door Middag-Humsterland
3rd Dutch National Road Race Championships
2nd Grote Prijs Gerrie Knetemann
3rd L'Heure D'Or Féminine
3rd Holland Hills Classic
3rd Overall, Giro della Toscana Int. Femminile
2007
3rd Dutch National Road Race Championships
2008
1st Stage 1, Tour of New Zealand
2nd Trofeo Alfredo Binda
2nd Overall Tour du Grand Montréal

1st stage 4

2nd Overall UCI World Cup
2009
1st Omloop Het Nieuwsblad

== Teams ==
- Farm Frites – Hartol Cycling Team (2003)
- Team Ton Van Bemmelen Sports (2004)
- Van Bemmelen – AA Drink (2005)
- AA Drink Cycling Team (2006)
- T-Mobile Women (2007)
- Nürnberger Versicherung (2008–9)
- Skil Koga 2011 season
