= Ghita Beltman =

Dutch cyclist

Personal information
- Born: 5 April 1978 Haastrecht, Netherlands

Cycling career
- Sport: Cycling
- Discipline: Road cycling

Professional team
- 2005: @Work Cycling Team

Ghita Beltman (born 5 April 1978 in Haastrecht) is a road cyclist from the Netherlands. She competed in the women's road race at the UCI Road World Championships in 1999, 2000, 2001, 2003 and 2004. In 2004, she won Stage 5 of the Tour de l'Aude Cycliste Féminin.
