= Charlotte Goldsmith =

British cyclist

Personal information
- Born: 18 March 1979 (age 47) United Kingdom

Cycling career
- Sport: Cycling
- Discipline: Road cycling

Professional teams
- 2000: Letchworth
- 2005: Vlaanderen-Capri Sonne-T-Interim
- 2006: Safi-Pasta Zara-Manhattan

Charlotte Goldsmith (born 18 March 1979) is a road cyclist from the United Kingdom. She represented England at the 2006 Commonwealth Games. She also rode for Great Britain at the 2004 and 2005 UCI Road World Championships.
