= Natalie Bates =

Australian cyclist (born 1980)

Nathalie Bates
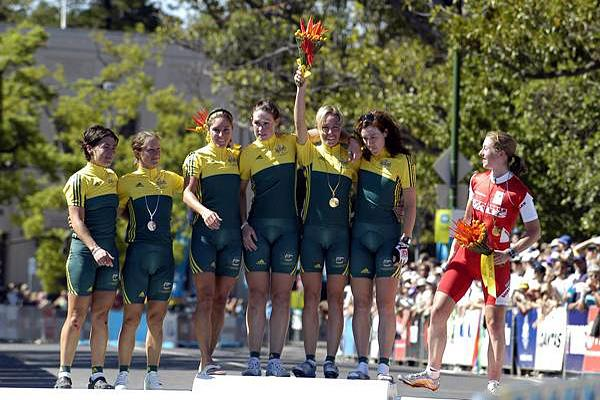
- Bates (holding flowers) celebrates winning gold at the 2006 Commonwealth Games

Personal information
- Born: 29 March 1980 (age 46) Australia

Cycling career
- Sport: Cycling
- Discipline: Road cycling

Professional teams
- 2005: Van Bemmelen–AA Drink
- 2006: AA Cycling Team
- 2008: Menikini-Selle Italia-Master Colors
Medal record
Women's Cycling
Representing Australia
Commonwealth Games
Gold medal – first place	2006 Melbourne	Road race

Nathalie Bates (born 29 March 1980) is a road cyclist from Australia. She represented her nation at the 1998, 2004, 2005, 2006 and 2008 UCI Road World Championships. At the 2006 Commonwealth Games she won the gold medal in the women's road race.
