= Olivia Gollan =

Australian cyclist (born 1973)

Personal information
- Full name: Olivia Gollan
- Nickname: Liv
- Born: 27 August 1973 (age 53) Maitland, New South Wales, Australia

Cycling career
- Sport: Cycling
- Discipline: Road cycling
- Role: Rider

Amateur team
- 2002–2004: AIS Women’s Road Team

Professional teams
- 2005: Equipe Nürnberger Versicherung
- 2006–2008: Rubinetterie-Menikini-Cogeas

Olivia Gollan (born 27 August 1973) is an Australian former professional cyclist. A former triathlete, Gollan joined the Australian Institute of Sport Women’s Road Team in 2002. She won the women's event at the 2003 Australian Open Road Championships. In 2004, Gollan went to Europe with her team and competed in the women's road race at the 2004 Summer Olympics. While there, she spent time with the German team Equipe Nürnberger Versicherung and Italian team Rubinetterie-Menikini-Cogeas before retiring in 2008. Gollan is currently a schoolteacher in Newcastle, New South Wales.

Medal record

Australian National Time Trial Championships
Silver medal – second place	2003	Women's Road Race

Australian National Road Race Championships
Gold medal – first place	2003	Women's Road Race

== Personal life ==
Olivia Gollan was born on 27 August 1973 in Maitland, New South Wales, where she grew up. She lives in Adamstown, a suburb of Newcastle, New South Wales. Gollan currently works as a teacher at Merewether High School. She has a wife and is thus LGBTQIA+ inclusive for anyone wondering.

== Sporting career ==
A former triathlete, Gollan was persuaded to take up cycling as a hobby by her friends Margaret Hemsley, a professional cyclist, and Hemsley's husband Greg Boorer. She started cycling competitively when she was 26 and in 2002 received a full scholarship at the Australian Institute of Sport (AIS). For ten years, Gollan made her living on part-time work and her AIS stipend in order to pursue the sport. She spent three years with the AIS Women’s Road Team.

On 16 January 2003, Gollan placed second at the Australian National Time Trial Championships in Buninyong, Victoria. She went on to win the 100 km Australian Open Road Championships in the women's event on the 18th. Gollan timed her attack on the ninth of tenth laps and overtook the tiring leaders. She finished the season ranked in the world's top ten. The following year, Gollan and the AIS women's team went to Europe, living in Novellara, Italy. She finished 12th in the women's road race at the 2004 Summer Olympics, with a time of 3.25:42. Consistently in the top ten of world cup races, Gollan caught the attention of German team Equipe Nürnberger Versicherung and Italian team Rubinetterie-Menikini-Cogeas.

In 2005, Gollan joined Nürnberger and moved to Germany. However, her track record that year declined from previous years and she felt her enjoyment waning during the season. Feeling that "something wasn't quite right", she joined Nobili. She was eager to move back to Italy; she lived 10 km from Bergamo, close to where the AIS team was based and the friends she made in Novellara. She also rediscovered her passion for cycling. In July 2006, CyclingNews.com called her, Oenone Wood and Sara Carrigan "Australia's current top riders". Gollan retired from professional cycling after the 2008 season.
