= Andrea Bosman =

Dutch cyclist

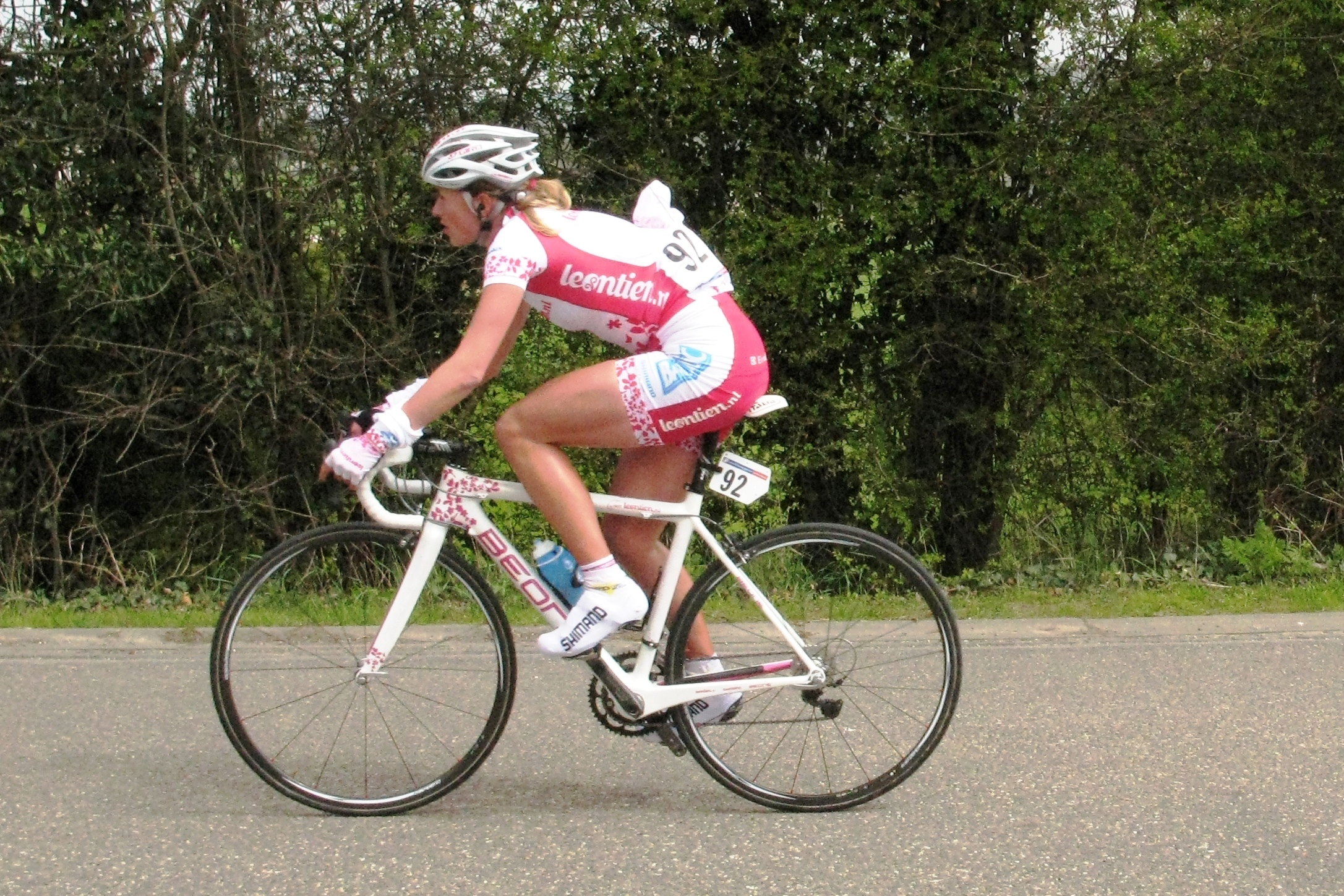
- Bosman in 2010

Personal information
- Born: 6 August 1979 (age 47) Norg, Netherlands

Cycling career
- Sport: Cycling
- Discipline: Road cycling

Professional teams
- 1999–2001: Team Farm Frites–Hartol
- 2002–2003: Bik–Powerplate
- 2004–2005: Vrienden van het Platteland
- 2006: @Work Cycling Team
- 2007–2008: Team DSB Bank
- 2009–2010: Leontien.nl

Andrea Bosman (born 6 August 1979 in Eindhoven) is a road cyclist from the Netherlands. She participated at the UCI Road World Championships in the women's road race in 2007 and 2009. She won stages in several stage races including in the: 2008 Tour de Bretagne Féminin, 2008 Gracia–Orlová, 2009 Rabo Ster Zeeuwsche Eilanden.

== Major results ==
2009
8th Omloop Het Nieuwsblad
