= Amy Moore =

Canadian cyclist

Personal information
- Born: 17 December 1973 (age 52) Welland, Ontario, Canada

Cycling career
- Sport: Cycling
- Discipline: Road cycling

Professional team
- 2006: T-Mobile Professional Cycling

Amy Moore (born 17 December 1973) is a road cyclist from Canada. She represented her nation at the 2003, 2004, 2005 and 2006 UCI Road World Championships.
