= Chantal Beltman =

Dutch cyclist (born 1976)

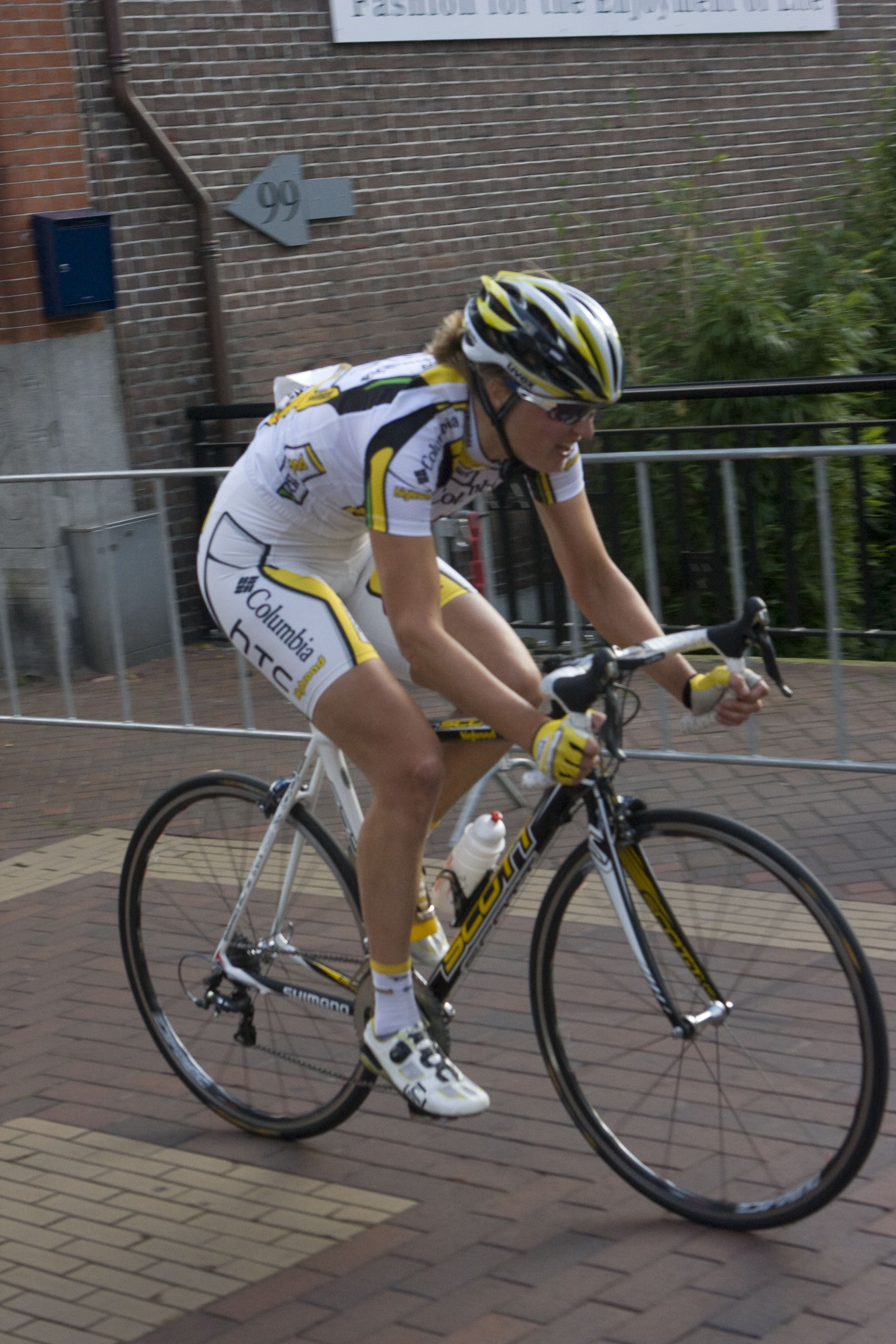

Personal information
- Full name: Chantal Beltman
- Born: 25 August 1976 (age 50) Slagharen, the Netherlands

Cycling career
- Sport: Cycling
- Discipline: Road
- Role: Rider

Professional teams
- 1995–1997: Libertas – Technogym
- 1998: The Greenery
- 1999–2001: Rabobank
- 2002–2003: Acca Due O Pasta Zara Lorena Camiche
- 2006: Vrienden van het Platteland
- 2007–2009: Team T-Mobile Women
Medal record
Women's cycling
Representing Netherlands
UCI Road World Championships
Silver medal – second place	2000	Road race

Chantal Beltman (born 25 August 1976 in Slagharen, Overijssel) is a former Dutch professional cyclist. She was part of the 2008 Team High Road Women team. In 2007 this was called the T-Mobile Women cycling team. In 2006, Beltman raced for Vrienden van het Platteland team. She is the older sister of Ghita Beltman, who is a former cyclist.

== Major results ==
1995
3rd Van Leuven Lady Trofee

1996
1st Omloop van het Ronostrand
1st Omloop van Ter Aar

1997
3rd Dutch National Time Trial Championships

1998
2nd Dutch National Road Race Championships
2nd Ster van Zeeland

1 stage Ster van Walcheren

1999
1st Stage 7 Tour de l'Aude Cycliste Féminin
2nd Omloop van het Ronostrand
3rd Primavera Rosa

2000
2nd Road Race, UCI Road World Championships
3rd Dutch National Road Race Championship
1st Lowland International Rotterdam Tour

2001
1st Stage 5 Women's Challenge
1 stage Tour de Bretagne

2002
1st Prologue Giro d'Italia Femminile
2nd Ronde van Drenthe
3rd Primavera Rosa

2003
1st Stage 2 International Thüringen Rundfahrt der Frauen
1st Lowland International Rotterdam Tour

2004
2nd Tour de Féminin - Krasna Lipa

1st Stage 1

1st Omloop van Borsele
2nd Dutch National Road Race Championships
1st Ster van Walcheren

2005
3rd Ster Zeeuwsche Eilanden

1 stage

5th World Championships – Women's road race
5th Overall Giro della Toscana Int. Femminile – Memorial Michela Fanini
6th Overall Holland Ladies Tour

2006 (Vrienden van het Platteland 2006 season)
3rd Sparkassen Giro
1st Flèche Hesbignonne WE
2nd Omloop door Middag-Humsterland
1st Grote Prijs Gerrie Knetemann
1st Haspengouwse Pijl
1st stage 1 (Team Time Trial), Giro della Toscana Int. Femminile – Memorial Michela Fanini
5th Omloop Het Volk

2007
1st Open de Suède Vårgårda
2nd Overall Giro della Toscana Int. Femminile – Memorial Michela Fanini

1st Stage 1 (Team Time Trial)

2008
1st Ronde van Drenthe
1st Liberty Classic

2009 (Team Columbia-HTC 2009 season)

== See also ==
- List of Dutch Olympic cyclists
