= 2004 UCI Road World Championships =

Cycling world championships

- Venue: Verona, Italy
- Date: 27 September – 3 October 2004
- Coordinates: 45°26′19″N 10°59′34″E
- Events: 10

The 2004 UCI Road World Championships took place in Verona, Italy, between 27 September and 3 October 2004. The event consisted of a road race and a time trial for men, women, men under 23, junior men and junior women.

== Events summary ==
Event	Gold		Silver		Bronze	
Men's events
Men's road race	Óscar Freire; Spain	6h57'15"	Erik Zabel; Germany	s.t.	Luca Paolini; Italy	s.t.
Men's time trial	Michael Rogers; Australia	57'30"	Michael Rich; Germany	+ 12"	Alexander Vinokourov; Kazakhstan	+ 25"
Women's events
Women's road race	Judith Arndt; Germany	3h44'38"	Tatiana Guderzo; Italy	+ 10"	Anita Valen; Norway	+ 12"
Women's time trial	Karin Thürig; Switzerland	30'53"	Judith Arndt; Germany	+ 52"	Zulfiya Zabirova; Russia	+ 57"
Men's Under-23 Events
Men's under-23 road race	Kanstantsin Sivtsov; Belarus	4h33'33"	Thomas Dekker; Netherlands	+ 1'01"	Mads Christensen; Denmark	+1'02"
Men's under-23 time trial	Janez Brajkovič; Slovenia	46'56"	Thomas Dekker; Netherlands	+ 18"	Vincenzo Nibali; Italy	+ 19"
Men's Junior Events
Men's Junior Road Race	Roman Kreuziger; Czech Republic	3h25'39"	Rafaâ Chtioui; Tunisia	s.t.	Simon Špilak; Slovenia	+6"
Men's Junior Time Trial	Patrick Gretsch; Germany	30'29"	Roman Kreuziger; Czech Republic	+ 15"	Stefan Schäfer; Germany	+ 16"
Women's Junior Events
Women's Junior Road Race	Marianne Vos; Netherlands	2h11'44"	Marta Bastianelli; Italy	+30"	Ellen van Dijk; Netherlands	s.t.
Women's Junior Time Trial	Tereza Huříková; Czech Republic	22'14"	Rebecca Much; United States	+ 5"	Amanda Spratt; Australia	s.t.
