= Cycling at the 1994 Commonwealth Games =

- Venue: Track: Juan de Fuca Velodrome; Road race and TTT:Patricia Bay Highway
- Location: Colwood, Canada
- Dates: 18 to 28 August 1994

Cycling at the 1994 Commonwealth Games was the 14th appearance of Cycling at the Commonwealth Games. The events were held in Victoria, Canada, from 18 to 28 August 1994.

The track events were held at the Juan de Fuca Velodrome (part of the Juan de Fuca Recreation Centre) in Colwood. The road events centered around the Patricia Bay Highway, with the men's road race being 180km and the time trials 100km (m) and 50km (w).

Australia topped the cycling medal table, by virtue of winning ten gold medals.

== Medal table ==
* Host nation (Canada)

Rank	Nation	Gold	Silver	Bronze	Total
1	Australia	10	3	4	17
2	New Zealand	1	4	4	9
3	Canada*	1	3	2	6
4	England	1	3	1	5
5	South Africa	0	0	1	1
5	Wales	0	0	1	1
Totals (6 entries)		13	13	13	39

== Medallists ==
Event	Gold	Silver	Bronze
Men
Time Trial	Shane Kelly; Australia	Darryn Hill; Australia	Tim O'Shannessey; Australia
Sprint	Gary Neiwand; Australia	Curt Harnett; Canada	Darryn Hill; Australia
Individual Pursuit	Brad McGee; Australia	Shaun Wallace; England	Stuart O'Grady; Australia
Team Pursuit	Australia; Brett Aitken; Brad McGee; Stuart O'Grady; Tim O'Shannessey	England; Tony Doyle; Rob Hayles; Chris Newton; Bryan Steel	New Zealand; Brendon Cameron; Julian Dean; Glen Thomson; Lee Vertongen
10 Miles Scratch	Stuart O'Grady; Australia1	Glenn McLeay; New Zealand	Brian Walton; Canada
Points Race	Brett Aitken; Australia	Stuart O'Grady; Australia	Dean Woods; Australia
Road Race	Mark Rendell; New Zealand	Brian Fowler; New Zealand	Willem Engelbrecht; South Africa
Road TTT	Australia; Phil Anderson; Brett Dennis; Henk Vogels; Damian McDonald	England; Peter Longbottom; Matt Illingworth; Simon Lillistone; Paul Jennings	New Zealand; Brian Fowler; Paul Leitch; Tim Pawson; Mark Rendell
Women
Sprint	Tanya Dubnicoff; Canada	Michelle Ferris; Australia	Donna Wynd; New Zealand
Individual Pursuit	Kathy Watt; Australia	Sarah Ulmer; New Zealand	Jacqui Nelson; New Zealand
Points Race	Yvonne McGregor; England	Jacqui Nelson; New Zealand	Sally Hodge; Wales
Road Race	Kathy Watt; Australia	Linda Jackson; Canada	Alison Sydor; Canada
Road TTT	Australia; Catherine Reardon; Kathy Watt; Louise Nolan; Rachel Victor	Canada; Alison Sydor; Anne Samplonius; Clara Hughes; Lesley Tomlinson	England; Julia Freeman; Maria Lawrence; Maxine Johnson; Yvonne McGregor

== Individual road race ==
Chris Lillywhite finished third but was denied the bronze medal and relegtaed to fourth place following a successful protest by the Australian team regarding jostling with Grant Rice.

Pos	Athlete	Time
1	(New Zealand) Mark Rendell	4:46:07.91
2	(New Zealand) Brian Fowler	4:48:09.76
3	(South Africa) Willem Engelbrecht	4:48:10.23
4	(England) Chris Lillywhite	4:48:10
5	(Australia) Grant Rice	4:48:10
6	(England) Mark Walsham	4:53:50
7	(Australia) Matt White	4:53:50
8	(Wales) Matt Postle	4:53:51
9	(Scotland) Roddy Riddle	4:54:00
10	(Canada) Czeslaw Lukaszewicz	4:59:53
11	(England) Simeon Hempsall	5:01:58
12	(South Africa) Andrew McLean	5:01:59
13	(Isle of Man) Andrew Roche	5:02:00
14	(Canada) Gordon Fraser	5:02.02
15	(England) Malcolm Elliott	5:02:02
16	(New Zealand) Richard Reid	5:02:02
17	(Australia) Phil Anderson	5:02:02
18	(Hong Kong) Chung-Yam Hung	5:02:02
19	(Hong Kong) Kam Po Wong	5:02:02
20	(New Zealand) Graeme Miller	5:02:02
21	(Wales) Daniel Wedley	5:02:02
22	(Northern Ireland) Mark Kane	5:02:03
23	(Malaysia) Kumaresan Murugayan	5:02:03
24	(Bermuda) Elliott Hubbard	5:02:03
25	(Zimbabwe) Timothy Jones	5:02:03
26	(Australia) Steven Drake	5:02:04
27	(Canada) Jeff Barnes	5:02:04
28	(Scotland) Andrew Young	5:02:04
29	(Malaysia) Shahrul Neeza Mohd Razali	5:02:09

== Road 100km team time trial ==
Pos	Team	Time
1	(Australia) Dennis, McDonald, Vogels, Anderson	1:53:19.13
2	(England) Illingworth, Jennings, Longbottom, Lillistone	1:56:40.76
3	(New Zealand) Fowler, Leitch, Pawson, Rendell	1:56:52.82
4	(Wales) Wooles, Postle, Owen, Colloby	1:58:55.42
5	(Canada) Anand, Barnes, Wedge, Wohlberg	1:59:08.77
6	(Northern Ireland) C. McCann, Moss, D. McCann, McClelland	2:00:00.50
7	Hong Kong	2:09:09.65
8	Zimbabwe	2:09:51.79
9	(Namibia) Seiler, Heymans, du Plessis, Swanepoel	2:13:31.92
10	Cayman Islands	2:25:03.25

== Ten miles scratch race ==
Pos	Athlete	Time
1	(Australia) Stuart O'Grady	18:50.520
2	(New Zealand) Glenn McLeay	18:50.520
3	(Canada) Brian Walton	18:50.520
4	(England) Simon Lillistone	
5	(Australia) Rodney McGee	
6	(England) Jeff Snodin	
7	(Trinidad and Tobago) Gene Samuel	
8	(New Zealand) Ryan Cull	
9	(Malaysia) Kumaresan Murugayan	
10	(Northern Ireland) Tommy Evans	
11	(South Africa) Jean-Pierre van Zyl	
12	(Scotland) Anthony Stirrat	
13	(New Zealand) Brent Johnson	
14	(Northern Ireland) John McClelland	
15	(Wales) Richard Hughes	
16	(Isle of Man) Andrew Roche	
17	(Canada) Tim Hadfield	
18	(South Africa) Marlin Mienie	
19	(Canada) Rodney Henderson	
20	(Australia) Brett Aitken	
21	(England) Paul Jennings	
22	(Wales) Stephen Colloby	
23	(South Africa) Robbert Dale	

== One kilometre time trial ==
Pos	Athlete	Time
1	(Australia) Shane Kelly	1:05.386
2	(Australia) Darryn Hill	1:05.632
3	(Australia) Tim O'Shannessey	1:06.789
4	(New Zealand) Jon Andrews	1:07.120
5	(England) Rob Hayles	1:07.270
6	(Trinidad and Tobago) Gene Samuel	1:07.696
7	(New Zealand) Ryan Cull	1:08.276
8	(South Africa) Jean-Pierre van Zyl	1:08.354
9	(New Zealand) John Rastrick	1:08.581
10	(Trinidad and Tobago) Michael Phillips	1:08.694
11	(New Zealand) Kurt Innes	1:09.009
12	(Scotland) Anthony Stirrat	1:09.448
13	(Canada) David Cook	1:10.169
14	(Barbados) Livingston Alleyne	1:10.571
15	(Wales) William Wright	1:11.514
16	(Barbados) John Cumberbatch	1:12.016
17	(Cayman Islands) Don Campbell	1:12.361
18	(Zambia) Jesper Lublinkhof	1:13.298
19	(Northern Ireland) Mark Kane	1:14.263
20	(The Bahamas) Barron Archiebold Musgrove	1:16.773
21	(Kenya) Greg Khan	1:17.652
22	(Kenya) Victor Ngei	1:18.027

== 4,000m individual pursuit ==
Pos	Athlete
1	(Australia) Bradley McGee
2	(England) Shaun Wallace
3	(Australia) Stuart O'Grady
4	(New Zealand) Glenn McLeay
5	(Australia) Dean Woods
6	(Canada) Brian Walton
7	(England) Stuart Dangerfield
8	(New Zealand) Brendon Cameron

Qualifying (top 8)

- McGee 4.36.226, Woods 4.36.486, Wallace 4.36.998, Dangerfield 4.37.351, O'Grady 4.38.681, Walton 4.38.705, Steel 4.41.675, Thomson 4.42.664

Semi finals

- McGee bt Dangerfield 4.37.908 / 4.43.020
- Wallace bt Woods 4.37.769 / 4.40.719

Final

- McGee bt Wallace 4.31.371 / 4.34.662

== Team pursuit ==
Pos	Team
1	(Australia) McGee, Aitken, Woods, O'Grady, O'Shannessey
2	(England) Doyle, Steel, Newton, Hayles
3	(New Zealand) Cameron, Dean, Thomson, Vertongen
4	(Canada) Barry, Hadfield, Henderson, Walton
5	(South Africa) Mienie, Dale, Van Zyl

Semi finals

- England bt New Zealand 4.22.340 / 4.22.425
- Australia bt Canada 4.20.945 / 4.26.075

Final

- Australia bt England caught

== 1,000m match sprint ==
Pos	Athlete
1	(Australia) Gary Neiwand
2	(Canada) Curt Harnett
3	(Australia) Darryn Hill
4	(New Zealand) Jon Andrews
5	(Trinidad and Tobago) Clinton Grant
6	(South Africa) Jean-Pierre van Zyl
7	(New Zealand) John Rastrick
8	(Scotland) Stewart Brydon

Quarter finals

- Harnett bt Van Zyl 11.337 & 11.312
- Neiwand bt Grant 11.516 & 12.081
- Andrews bt Rastrick 12.079 & 11.479
- Hill bt Brydon 11.219 & 11.504

Semi finals

- Harnett bt Andrews 13.178 & 12.154
- Newiand bt Hill 11.225 (lost 10.731), 11.235

Bronze

- Hill bt Andrews 10.857 & 11.101

Final

- Neiwand bt Harnett 11.399 & 11.488

== Points race ==
Pos	Athlete	Time
1	(Australia) Brett Aitken	38
2	(Australia) Stuart O'Grady	37
3	(Australia) Dean Woods	23
4	(New Zealand) Glenn McLeay	21
5	(Canada) Brian Walton	17
6	(England) Simon Lillistone	12
7	(Scotland) Anthony Stirrat	9
8	(South Africa) Jean-Pierre van Zyl	7
9	(England) Tony Doyle	7
10	(New Zealand) Glen Thomson	6
11	(New Zealand) Brendon Cameron	6
12	(Canada) Mike Barry	5
13	(Northern Ireland) John McClelland	5
14	(South Africa) Marlin Mienie	3
15	(England) Paul Jennings	2

== Women's individual road race ==
Pos	Athlete	Time
1	(Australia) Kathy Watt	2:48:04.73
2	(Canada) Linda Jackson	2:48:34.75
3	(Canada) Alison Sydor	2:50:17.45
4	(Isle of Man) Marie Purvis	2:50.17
5	(Australia) Catherine Susan Reardon	2:50:17
6	(Canada) Sue Palmer-Komar	2:50:17
7	(Australia) Louise Nolan	2:50:21
8	(Canada) Lesley Tomlinson	2:50:23
9	(New Zealand) Rebecca Bailey	2:51:36
10	(New Zealand) Susy Pryde	2:53:63
11	(South Africa) Jacqueline Martin	2:54:48
12	(Wales) Sally Hodge	2:54:48
13	(England) Maria Lawrence	2:54:48
14	(New Zealand) Janet O'Hara	2:54:48
15	(Australia) Anita Crossley	2:54:51
16	(Wales) Clare Greenwood	2:54:54
17	(Scotland) Sarah Phillips	2:57:53
18	(England) Julia Freeman	3:03:05
19	(England) Maxine Johnson	3:03:42

== Women's road 50km team time trial ==
Pos	Team	Time
1	(Australia) Reardon, Watt, Nolan, Victor	1:04:03.20
2	(Canada) Sydor, Samplonius, Hughes, Tomlinson	1:04:18.92
3	(England) Freeman, Lawrence, johnson, McGregor	1:06:32.85
4	(New Zealand) Bailey, Hassan, O'Hara, Pryde	

== Women's 3,000m individual pursuit ==
Pos	Athlete
1	(Australia) Kathy Watt
2	(New Zealand) Sarah Ulmer
3	(New Zealand) Jacqui Nelson
4	(Australia) Rachel Marianne Victor
5	(England) Yvonne McGregor
6	(Scotland) Sarah Phillips
7	(Canada) Linda Jackson
8	(Wales) Clare Greenwood

Qualifying (top 8)

- Watt 3.49.259, Victor 3.49.937, Ulmer 3.51.452, Nelson 3.52.383, McGrgegor 3.55.805, Phillips 4.01.211, Jackson 4.04.644, Greenwood 4.12.852

Semi finals

- Watt bt Nelson 3.52.128 / 3.55.241
- Ulmer bt Victor 3.55.728 / 3.56.036

Bronze

- Nelson bt Victor 3.55.241/ 3.56.036

Final

- Watt bt Ulmer 3:48.52 / 3:50.953

== Women's 1,000m match sprint ==
Pos	Athlete
1	(Canada) Tanya Dubnicoff
2	(Australia) Michelle Ferris
3	(New Zealand) Donna Wynd
4	(England) Wendy Everson
5	(Barbados) Esther Miller
6	(Jersey) Lynn Minchinton

Quarter finals

- Dubnicoff bt Minchinton 13.097 & 14.591
- Ferris bt Everson 12.675 & 13.080
- Wynd bt Miller 12.296 & 12.658

Repechage final

- Everson bt Miller & Minchinton 12.757

Semi finals

- Dubnicoff bt Everson 12.019 & 12.488
- Ferris bt Wynd 12.479 & 12.065

Bronze

- Wynd bt Everson 12.606 & 12.533

Final

- Dubnicoff bt Ferris 12.129 & 12.164

== Women's points ==
Pos	Athlete	Time
1	(England) Yvonne McGregor	35
2	(New Zealand) Jacqui Nelson	32
3	(Wales) Sally Hodge	28
4	(Australia) Kathy Watt	27
5	(New Zealand) Sarah Ulmer	12
6	(Scotland) Sarah Phillips	10
7	(Australia) Rachel Marianne Victor	9
8	(England) Maxine Johnson	4
9	(Wales) Clare Greenwood	-
10	(England) Maria Lawrence	-
