= Cycling at the 1998 Commonwealth Games =

- Venue: Track: Cheras Velodrome; Road: Shah Alam Circuit
- Location: Kuala Lumpur, Malaysia
- Dates: 11 to 21 September 1998

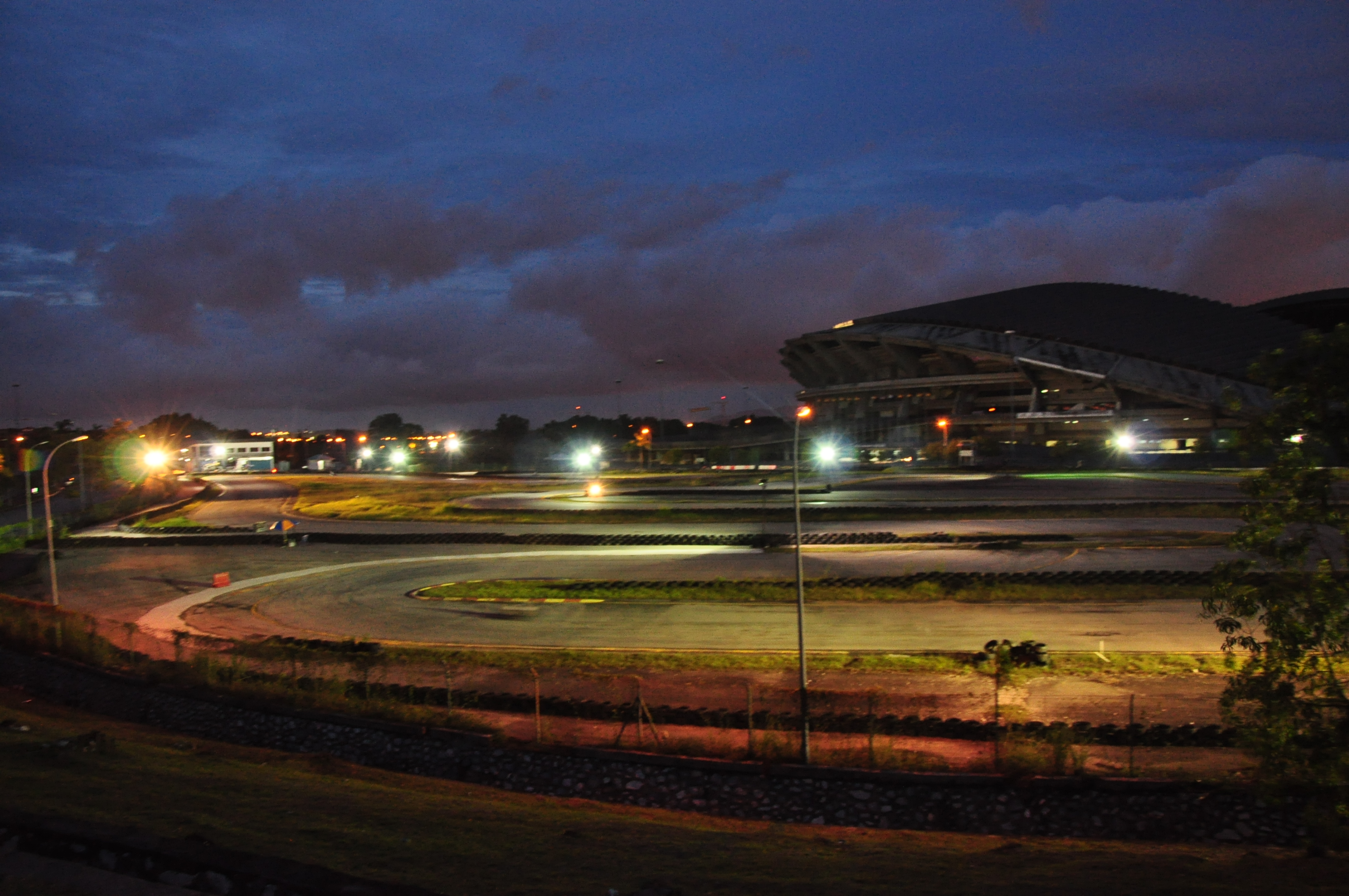
A section of the Shah Alam Circuit in 2009

Cycling at the 1998 Commonwealth Games was the 15th appearance of Cycling at the Commonwealth Games. The events were held in Kuala Lumpur, Malaysia, from 11 to 21 September 1998. Changes in events saw the road team time trial replaced by the individual time trial.

The track events were held at the Cheras Velodrome (built in 1986) and the road events were held at the Shah Alam Circuit.

Australia topped the cycling medal table, by virtue of winning eight gold medals.

== Medal table ==
* Host nation (Malaysia)

Rank	Nation	Gold	Silver	Bronze	Total
1	Australia	8	5	3	16
2	Canada	3	1	3	7
3	New Zealand	2	2	3	7
4	England	0	4	2	6
5	Malaysia*	0	1	0	1
6	Barbados	0	0	1	1
6	South Africa	0	0	1	1
Totals (7 entries)		13	13	13	39

== Medallists ==
Event	Gold	Silver	Bronze
Men
Road time trial	Eric Wohlberg; Canada	Stuart O'Grady; Australia	David George; South Africa
Road race	Jay Sweet; Australia	Nor Effandy Rosli; Malaysia	Eric Wohlberg; Canada
1000m individual sprint	Darryn Hill; Australia	Sean Eadie; Australia	Barry Forde; Barbados
1,000m time trial	Shane Kelly; Australia	Jason Queally; England	Joshua Kersten; Australia
4000m individual pursuit	Brad McGee; Australia	Luke Roberts; Australia	Matt Illingworth; England
4000m team pursuit	Australia; Brad McGee; Brett Lancaster; Luke Roberts; Michael Rogers; Timothy Lyons	England; Bradley Wiggins; Colin Sturgess; Jon Clay; Matt Illingworth; Robert Hayles	New Zealand; Brendon Cameron; Greg Henderson; Lee Vertongen; Timothy Carswell
Scratch race	Michael Rogers; Australia	Shaun Wallace; England	Timothy Carswell; New Zealand
Points race	Glen Thomson; New Zealand	Rob Hayles; England	Greg Henderson; New Zealand
Women
Road time trial	Anna Wilson; Australia	Linda Jackson; Canada	Kathy Watt; Australia
Road race	Lyne Bessette; Canada	Susy Pryde; New Zealand	Anna Wilson; Australia
1,000m individual sprint	Tanya Dubnicoff; Canada	Michelle Ferris; Australia	Lori-Ann Muenzer; Canada
3000m individual pursuit	Sarah Ulmer; New Zealand	Alayna Burns; Australia	Yvonne McGregor; England
Points race	Alayna Burns; Australia	Sarah Ulmer; New Zealand	Annie Gariepy; Canada

== Men's individual 184km road race ==
Pos	Athlete	Time
1	(Australia) Jay Sweet	4:31:56
2	(Malaysia) Nor Effandy Rosli	4:31:56
3	(Canada) Eric Wohlberg	4:31:56
4	(South Africa) David George	4:31:57
5	(Wales) Paul Esposti	4:31:59
6	(Canada) Brian Walton	4:32:16
7	(England) Chris Lillywhite	4:32:19
8	(Australia) Scott McGrory	4:32:19
9	(Canada) Czeslaw Lukaszewicz	4:32:19
10	(Malaysia) Mohd Mahazir Hamad	4:32:19
11	(Isle of Man) Robert Holden	4:32:19
12	(Northern Ireland) Conor Henry	4:32:19
13	(England) Chris Walker	4:32:27
14	(Canada) Gordon Fraser	4:32:27
15	(Australia) Stuart O'Grady	4:32:27
16	(Northern Ireland) Neil Teggart	4:32:27
17	(New Zealand) Brendon Vesty	4:32:27
18	(South Africa) Jacques Fullard	4:32:27
19	(Bermuda) Elliott Hubbard	4:32:27
20	(England) Chris Newton	4:32:27
21	(Wales) Julian Winn	4:32:27
22	(England) John Tanner	4:32:27
23	(Canada) Sylvain Beauchamp	4:32:27
24	(Northern Ireland) Denis Easton	4:33:46
25	(New Zealand) Scott Guyton	4:33:46
26	(South Africa) Malcolm Lange	4:34:01
27	(Northern Ireland) Tommy Evans	4:34:40
28	(Jersey) Samuel Firby	4:34:46
29	(Australia) Matt White	4:37:32
30	(Malaysia) Kumaresan Murugayan	4:40:55

== Men's road 42 km individual time trial ==
Pos	Athlete	Time
1	(Canada) Eric Wohlberg	53:15
2	(Australia) Stuart O'Grady	53:30
3	(South Africa) David George	53:56
4	(Australia) Matt White	54:05
5	(South Africa) James Perry	54:09
6	(England) Stuart Dangerfield	54:13
7	(England) Chris Newton	54:16
8	(Canada) Matthew Anand	55:08
9	(Australia) Peter Rogers	55:17
10	(South Africa) Robbie Hunter	55:23
11	(Scotland) James Gladwell	55:37
12	(Northern Ireland) David McCann	55:52
13	(New Zealand) Lee Vertongen	56:17
14	(Mauritius) Patrick Haberland	56:24
15	(Jersey) Samuel Firby	56:32
16	(Namibia) Johannes Heymans	56:46
17	(Wales) Matt Postle	57.02
18	(Bermuda) Elliott Hubbard	57:13
19	(Isle of Man) Robert Holden	57:30
20	(Malaysia) Shahrul Neeza Mohd Razali	57:36
21	(Kenya) David Kinja Njau	57:59
22	(Scotland) Richard Moore	58:30
23	(Cayman Islands) Duke Perrigoff Merren	58:55
24	(Malaysia) Mohd Mahazir Hamad	58:58
25	(Namibia) Frank Bombosch	59:44
26	(Northern Ireland) Scott Hamilton	59:56
27	(Namibia) Jacques Celliers	1:00:22
28	(Northern Ireland) John Boone	1:01:08
29	(Kenya) Crispine Omondi	1:01:26

== Men's One kilometre time trial ==
Pos	Athlete	Time
1	(Australia) Shane Kelly	1:04.018
2	(England) Jason Queally	1:04.427
3	(Australia) Joshua Kersten	1:04.618
4	(Australia) Daniel Day	1:05.442
5	(Scotland) Craig MacLean	1:06.020
6	(New Zealand) Matt Sinton	1:06.211
7	(New Zealand) Darren McKenzie-Potter	1:06.309
8	(Trinidad and Tobago) Michael Phillips	1:06.525
9	(Scotland) Chris Hoy	1:06.541
10	(Canada) Douglas Baron	1:07.259
11	(New Zealand) Hayden Godfrey	1:07.284
12	(Northern Ireland) Alwyn McMath	1:08.246
13	(Barbados) John Cumberbatch	1:09.422
14	(Barbados) Shawn Kelly	1:09.476
15	(Trinidad and Tobago) Clinton Grant	1:09.601
16	(Malaysia) Kadiron Jamil	1:10.112
17	(Cayman Islands) Stefan Baraud	1:11.305
18	(Malaysia) Ah Thiam Wong	1:13.145
19	(Cayman Islands) Michael Vernon	1:13.188
20	(Northern Ireland) Neil Teggart	1:13.795

== Men's 1,000m match sprint ==
Pos	Athlete
1	(Australia) Darryn Hill
2	(Australia) Sean Eadie
3	(Barbados) Barry Forde
4	(England) Peter Jacques
5	(Scotland) Craig MacLean
6	(Australia) Daniel Day
7	(South Africa) Jean-Pierre van Zyl
8	(Trinidad and Tobago) Stephen Alfred

Quarter finals

- Hill bt MacLean 2-0 (11.186, 10.954)
- Eadie bt Van Zyl 2-0 (10.987, 11.019)
- Forde bt Alfred 2-1 (11.464, 11.068, 11.100)
- Jacques bt Day 2-1 (11.283, 10.981 11.260)

Semi finals

- Hill bt
- Eadie bt

Bronze

- Forde bt Jacques 2-1 (12.334, 12.055 11.499)

Final

- Hill bt Eadie 2-0 (10.533, 10.618

== Men's 4,000m individual pursuit ==
Pos	Athlete
1	(Australia) Bradley McGee
2	(Australia) Luke Roberts
3	(England) Matt Illingworth
4	(England) Bradley Wiggins
5	(New Zealand) Lee Vertongen
6	(New Zealand) Fraser Macmaster
7	(New Zealand) Brendon Cameron
8	(South Africa) James Perry

Qualifying (top 8)

- McGee 4.33.138, Illingworth 4.38.764, Roberts 4.39.59, Wiggins 4.43.095, Vertongen 4.43.124, Macmaster 4.45.550, Cameron 4.47.291, Perry 4.47.586 (top 4 to semi-final)

Semi finals

- McGee bt Wiggins
- Roberts bt Illingworth

Bronze

- Illingworth bt Wiggins 3.03.950

Final

- McGee bt Roberts 4.30.594 / overtaken

== Men's team pursuit ==
Pos	Team
1	(Australia) McGee, Lancaster, Roberts, Rogers, Lyons
2	(England) Wiggins, Sturgess, Clay, Illingworth, Hayles
3	(New Zealand) Cameron, Henderson, Vertongen, Carswell
4	(Wales) Owen, Williams, Pritchard, Sheppard, Jones
5	(South Africa) Perry, Lange, Welgemoed, Dale
6	(Malaysia) Faizal Izuan, Fadzillah, Razli Hardi, Lee

Semi finals

- England bt New Zealand 4.14.189 / 4.15.536
- Australia bt Wales 4.19.905 /4.27.930

Bronze

- New Zealand bt Wales 4.17.933 / 4.28.644

Final

- Australia bt England 4.13.405 / 4.14.298

== Men's points race ==
Pos	Athlete	Points
1	(New Zealand) Glen Thomson	35
2	(England) Rob Hayles	29
3	(New Zealand) Greg Henderson	24
4	(Canada) Brian Walton	18
5	(Australia) Michael Rogers	17
6	(South Africa) James Perry	12
7	(New Zealand) Tim Carswell	10
8	(Australia) Luke Roberts	8
9	(South Africa) Malcolm Lange	8
10	(Wales) Paul Sheppard	5
11	(Wales) Huw Pritchard	4
12	(Malaysia) Kumaresan Murugayan	1
13	(England) Shaun Wallace	17 -1
14	(Australia) Stephen Pate	15 -1
15	(England) Colin Sturgess	13 -1
16	(Trinidad and Tobago) Richard Dickie	8 -1
17	(South Africa) Moolman Welgemoed	3 -1
18	(Wales) Alun Owen	3 -1
19	(Isle of Man) Mark Richard Kelly	1 -1

== Men's 20km scratch race ==
Pos	Athlete	Time
1	(Australia) Michael Rodgers	25:18.340
2	(England) Shaun Wallace	25:18.340
3	(New Zealand) Tim Carswell	25:18.340

== Women's 92 km road race ==
Pos	Athlete	Time
1	(Australia) Lyne Bessette	2:24:59
2	(Canada) Susy Pryde	2:24:59
3	(Australia) Anna Wilson	2:24:59
4	(Wales) Louise Jones	2:26:35
5	(Australia) Kathy Watt	2:26:38
6	(Canada) Linda Jackson	2:26:39
7	(Australia) Tracey Gaudry	2:29:41
8	(Australia) Juanita Feldhahn	2:29:47
9	(New Zealand) Joanna Lawn	2:29:47
10	(New Zealand) Jacinta Coleman	2:29:48
11	(Australia) Elizabeth Tadich	2:33:14
12	(Canada) Andrea Hannos	2:33:14
13	(Canada) Annie Gariepy	2:33:14
14	(England) Sally Boyden	2:33:14
15	(Canada) Kimberly Langton	2:33:14
16	(South Africa) Anriette Schoeman	2:33:14
17	(England) Melanie Szubrycht	2:33:14
18	(England) Ruth Ellway	2:33:14
19	(South Africa) Ronel Van Wyk	2:33:14
20	(New Zealand) Rebecca Bailey	2:33:14
21	(Samoa) Bianca Netzler	2:33:14
22	(England) Angela Hunter	2:33:14
23	(Canada) Anne Samplonius	2:33:14
24	(New Zealand) Maria Hassan	2:37:47
25	(South Africa) Karin Avenant	2:48:41

== Women's 28 km individual time trial ==
Pos	Athlete	Time
1	(Australia) Anna Wilson	37:34
2	(Canada) Linda Jackson	38:34
3	(Australia) Kathy Watt	38:39
4	(England) Yvonne McGregor	39.45
5	(Wales) Megan Hughes	39.49
6	(Canada) Anne Samplonius	39.54
7	(Australia) Juanita Feldhahn	39.55
8	(England) Maria Lawrence	40.48
9	(Canada) Andrea Hannos	41.56
10	(Wales) Louise Jones	41.58
11	(Wales) Claire Greenwood	42.39
12	(England) Ceris Gilfillan	42.41
13	(Samoa) Bianca Netzler	42.50
14	(South Africa) Ronel Van Wyk	43.10
15	(Scotland) Zoe Anderson	43.43
16	(Jersey) Susanne Munns	45.12
17	(Namibia) Conny Kleynhans	45.13
18	(Malaysia) Noor Asrina Sulaiman	46.30
19	(Fiji) Sisilia Gravelle	52.47
20	(Fiji) Claire Thoms	54.55

== Women's 3,000m individual pursuit ==
Pos	Athlete
1	(New Zealand) Sarah Ulmer
2	(Australia) Alayna Burns
3	(England) Yvonne McGregor
4	(Australia) Lucy Tyler-Sharman
5	(Australia) Karen Barrow
6	(New Zealand) Rawea Greenwood
7	(Wales) Megan Hughes
8	(Canada) Andrea Hannos

Qualifying (top 8)

- Burns 3.40.389, Tyler-Sharman 3.41.015, Ulmer 3.42.063, McGregor 3.43.885, Barrow 3.45.824, Greenwood 3.50.723, Hughes 3.54.300, Hannos 3.54.864 (top 4 to semi-final)

Semi finals

- Burns bt McGregor
- Ulmer bt Tyler-Sharman

Bronze

- McGregor bt Tyler-Sharman 3.53.977 / walkover

Final

- Ulmer bt Burns 3.41.667 / 3.42.968

== Women's 1,000m match sprint ==
Pos	Athlete
1	(Canada) Tanya Dubnicoff
2	(Australia) Michelle Ferris
3	(Canada) Lori-Ann Muenzer
4	(Australia) Lyndelle Higginson
5	(New Zealand) Fiona Ramage
6	(Malaysia) Mohd Janis Halimah
7	(England) Melanie Szubrycht
8	(South Africa) Tracey van Niekerk

Quarter finals

- Dubnicoff bt Janis 2-0 (12.840, 12.704)
- Ferris bt Szubrycht 2-0 (12.866, 13.023)
- Muenzer bt Van Niekerk 2-0 (12.549, 12.110)
- Higginson bt Ramage 2-0 (12.192, 13.133)

Semi finals

- Dubnicoff bt
- Ferris bt

Bronze

- Muenzer bt Higginson 2-0 (12.086, 12.157)

Final

- Dubnicoff bt Ferris 2-0 (12.061, 12.053)

== Women's points race ==
Pos	Athlete	Points
1	(Australia) Alayna Burns	34
2	(New Zealand) Sarah Ulmer	31
3	(Canada) Annie Gariepy	19
4	(Australia) Karen Barrow	13
5	(Wales) Megan Hughes	13
6	(Canada) Andrea Hannos	13
7	(England) Sally Boyden	8
8	(England) Melanie Szubrycht	4
9	(Wales) Louise Jones	3
10	(England) Michelle Ward	3
11	(New Zealand) Fiona Ramage	0
