= New Zealand at the 1998 Commonwealth Games =

- CG code: NZL
- CGA: New Zealand Olympic Committee
- Website: www.olympic.org.nz

in Kuala Lumpur, Malaysia
- Competitors: 217
- Flag bearer (opening): Graeme Miller
- Flag bearer (closing): Darren Liddel
- Officials: 80
- Medals Ranked 6th: Gold 8 Silver 6 Bronze 20 Total 34

Commonwealth Games appearances (overview)
- 1930; 1934; 1938; 1950; 1954; 1958; 1962; 1966; 1970; 1974; 1978; 1982; 1986; 1990; 1994; 1998; 2002; 2006; 2010; 2014; 2018; 2022; 2026; 2030

New Zealand at the 1998 Commonwealth Games was represented by a team of 217 competitors and 80 officials. Selection of the team for the Games in Kuala Lumpur, was the responsibility of the New Zealand Olympic Committee. New Zealand's flagbearer at the opening ceremony was cyclist Graeme Miller, and at the closing ceremony was weightlifter Darren Liddel. The New Zealand team finished sixth on the medal table, winning a total of 34 medals, 8 of which were gold.

New Zealand has competed in every games, starting with the British Empire Games in 1930 at Hamilton, Ontario.

== Medal tables ==
Medal	Name	Sport	Event
Gold	Beatrice Faumuina	Athletics	Women's discus throw
Gold	Glen Thomson	Cycling – track	Men's points race
Gold	Sarah Ulmer	Cycling – track	Women's 3000 m individual pursuit
Gold	New Zealand rugby sevens team: Christian Cullen; Rico Gear; Jonah Lomu; Caleb Ralph; Roger Randle; Amasio Valence; Bruce Reihana; Eric Rush; Dallas Seymour; Joeli Vidiri	Rugby sevens	Men's tournament
Gold	Stephen Petterson	Shooting	Men's 50 m rifle prone
Gold	Darren Liddel	Weightlifting	Men's +105 kg snatch
Gold	Darren Liddel	Weightlifting	Men's +105 kg clean & jerk
Gold	Darren Liddel	Weightlifting	Men's +105 kg total
Silver	Susy Pryde	Cycling – road	Women's road race
Silver	Sarah Ulmer	Cycling – track	Women's points race
Silver	New Zealand netball team: Belinda Charteris; Belinda Colling; Julie Seymour; Sonya Hardcastle; Donna Loffhagen; Bernice Mene; Lesley Nicol; Anna Rowberry; Joanne Steed; Lorna Suafoa; Noeline Taurua; Linda Vagana	Netball	Women's tournament
Silver	Tania Corrigan; Jocelyn Lees	Shooting	Women's 10 m air pistol pairs
Silver	Tania Corrigan; Jocelyn Lees	Shooting	Women's 25 m pistol pairs
Silver	Alan Earle; Jason Wakeling	Shooting	Men's 25 m rapid-fire pistol pairs
Bronze	Joanne Henry	Athletics	Women's heptathlon
Bronze	Rhona Robertson; Tammy Jenkins	Badminton	Women's doubles
Bronze	Geoff Bellingham; Chris Blair; Dean Galt; Anton Gargiulo; Nick Hall; Jarrod King; Daniel Shirley	Badminton	Men's team
Bronze	Garth da Silva	Boxing	Men's heavyweight
Bronze	New Zealand men's cricket team: Geoff Allott; Nathan Astle; Mark Bailey; Matthew Bell; Chris Drum; Stephen Fleming; Chris Harris; Matt Horne; Shayne O'Connor; Adam Parore; Craig McMillan; Alex Tait; Daniel Vettori; Paul Wiseman	Cricket	Men's tournament
Bronze	Tim Carswell	Cycling – track	Men's scratch race
Bronze	Brendon Cameron; Tim Carswell; Greg Henderson; Lee Vertongen	Cycling – track	Men's 4000 m team pursuit
Bronze	Greg Henderson	Cycling – track	Men's points race
Bronze	David Phillips	Gymnastics	Men's floor
Bronze	New Zealand women's hockey team: Tina Bell-Kake; Helen Clarke; Jenny Duck; Emily Gillam; Sandy Hitchcock; Anna Lawrence; Robyn Toomey; Skippy Hamahona; Suzie Pearce; Moira Senior; Jenny Shepherd; Karen Smith; Mandy Smith; Kate Trolove; Lisa Walton; Diana Weavers	Hockey	Women's tournament
Bronze	Millie Khan	Lawn bowls	Women's singles
Bronze	Des Coe	Shooting	Men's trap
Bronze	Tania Corrigan	Shooting	Women's 10 m air pistol
Bronze	Sally Johnston	Shooting	Women's 50 m rifle prone
Bronze	Greg Yelavich	Shooting	Men's 10 m air pistol
Bronze	Sarah Cook; Glen Wilson	Squash	Mixed doubles
Bronze	Toni Jeffs	Swimming	Women's 50 m freestyle
Bronze	Trent Bray; Scott Cameron; John Davis; Danyon Loader	Swimming	Men's 4 × 200 m freestyle relay
Bronze	Nigel Avery	Weightlifting	Men's 105 kg snatch
Bronze	Nigel Avery	Weightlifting	Men's 105 kg total

Medals by sport
Sport	Gold medal	Silver medal	Bronze medal	Total
Weightlifting	3	0	2	5
Cycling	2	2	3	7
Shooting	1	3	4	8
Athletics	1	0	1	2
Rugby sevens	1	0	0	1
Netball	0	1	0	1
Badminton	0	0	2	2
Swimming	0	0	2	2
Boxing	0	0	1	1
Cricket	0	0	1	1
Gymnastics	0	0	1	1
Hockey	0	0	1	1
Lawn bowls	0	0	1	1
Squash	0	0	1	1
Total	8	6	20	34

Medals by gender
Gender	Gold medal	Silver medal	Bronze medal	Total
Male	6	1	12	19
Female	2	5	7	14
Mixed / open	0	0	1	1
Total	8	6	20	34

== Competitors ==
The following table lists the number of New Zealand competitors who participated at the Games according to gender and sport.

Sport	Men	Women	Total
Athletics	16	12	28
Badminton	7	7	14
Boxing	6	—N/a	6
Cricket	14	—N/a	14
Cycling	15	8	23
Diving	1	1	2
Gymnastics	4	7	11
Hockey	16	16	32
Lawn bowls	7	7	14
Netball	—N/a	12	12
Rugby sevens	10	—N/a	10
Shooting	15	5	20
Squash	4	4	8
Swimming	8	4	12
Synchronised swimming	—N/a	1	1
Tenpin bowling	2	2	4
Weightlifting	6	—N/a	6
Total	131	86	217

== Athletics ==
- Zion Armstrong
- Craig Barrett
- Diggory Brooke
- Chantal Brunner
- Alan Bunce
- Hamish Christensen
- Mathew Coad
- Phil Costley
- Chris Donaldson
- Jenni Dryburgh
- Shaun Farrell
- Beatrice Faumuina
- Melina Hamilton
- Joanne Henry
- Toni Hodgkinson
- Philip Jensen
- Cassandra Kelly
- Aaron Langdon
- Tania Lutton
- Frith Maunder
- Lee-Ann McPhillips
- Rowena Morton
- Denis Petouchinski
- Doug Pirini
- Simon Poelman
- Tony Sargisson
- Tasha Williams
- Ian Winchester

== Cricket ==
New Zealand named the below squad for the tournament.

Roster

- Stephen Fleming (c)
- Geoff Allott
- Nathan Astle
- Mark Bailey
- Matthew Bell
- Chris Drum
- Chris Harris
- Matt Horne
- Craig McMillan
- Shayne O'Connor
- Adam Parore (wk)
- Alex Tait
- Daniel Vettori
- Paul Wiseman

Summary

Team	Event	Group stage				Semifinal	Final / BM	
Team	Event	Opposition Result	Opposition Result	Opposition Result	Rank	Opposition Result	Opposition Result	Rank
New Zealand men	Men's tournament	Kenya; W by 5 wickets	Scotland; W by 177 runs	Pakistan; W by 81 runs	1 Q	Australia; L by 9 wickets	Sri Lanka; W by 51 runs	3rd place, bronze medalist(s)

Group stage

Group D
Pos	Team	Pld	W	L	T	NR	Pts	NRR
1	New Zealand	3	3	0	0	0	6	1.799
2	Pakistan	3	1	1	0	1	3	0.480
3	Kenya	3	1	2	0	0	2	−0.697
4	Scotland	3	0	2	0	1	1	−2.401

Source: ESPNcricinfo

10 September 1998
10:00
Scorecard

Kenya; 144/8 (50 overs)	v	New Zealand; 145/5 (47.3 overs)
Steve Tikolo 35 (64); Chris Harris 3/7 (10 overs)		Matt Horne 39 (76); Maurice Odumbe 1/17 (10 overs)

New Zealand won by 5 wickets
Perbadanan Kemajuan Negeri Selangor Sports Complex, Petaling Jaya
Umpires: Darrell Hair (Aus) and Steve Bucknor (Jam)

- New Zealand won the toss and elected to field.
- Craig McMillan (NZ) scored his 2,000th List A run.
- Points: New Zealand 2, Kenya 0.

13 September 1998
10:00
Scorecard

New Zealand; 278/6 (50 overs)	v	Scotland; 101 (42.4 overs)
Stephen Fleming 102 (135); James Brinkley 3/55 (10 overs)		George Salmond 31 (73); Chris Harris 4/25 (10 overs)

New Zealand won by 177 runs
Kelab Aman, Kuala Lumpur
Umpires: Beattie Arlow (NI) and Darrell Hair (Aus)

- Scotland won the toss and elected to field.
- Points: New Zealand 2, Scotland 0.
- Scotland were eliminated as a result of this match.

15 September 1998
10:00
Scorecard

New Zealand; 215/8 (50 overs)	v	Pakistan; 134 (42.5 overs)
Stephen Fleming 66 (99); Shoaib Akhtar 4/47 (10 overs)		Akhtar Sarfraz 34 (84); Daniel Vettori 3/33 (10 overs)

New Zealand won by 81 runs
Tenaga National Sports Complex, Kuala Lumpur
Umpires: Dave Orchard (SA) and Eddie Nicholls (Guy)

- Pakistan won the toss and elected to field.
- Points: New Zealand 2, Pakistan 0.
- New Zealand qualified for the semi-finals and Pakistan were eliminated as a result of this match.

Semi-final

17 September 1998
10:00
Scorecard

New Zealand; 58 (26.4 overs)	v	Australia; 62/1 (10.5 overs)
Stephen Fleming 20 (41); Brad Young 4/4 (4 overs)		Adam Gilchrist 42* (36); Alex Tait 1/17 (5 overs)

Australia won by 9 wickets
Tenaga National Sports Complex, Kuala Lumpur
Umpires: Dave Orchard (SA) and V. K. Ramaswamy (Ind)

- Australia won the toss and elected to field.

Bronze medal match

18 September 1998
10:00
Scorecard

New Zealand; 212/7 (50 overs)	v	Sri Lanka; 161 (44.4 overs)
Chris Harris 56* (71); Russel Arnold 1/27 (10 overs)		Suresh Perera 45 (55); Daniel Vettori 3/33 (10 overs)

New Zealand won by 51 runs
Tenaga National Sports Complex, Kuala Lumpur
Umpires: Rudi Koertzen (SA) and Saleem Badar (Pak)

- Sri Lanka won the toss and elected to field.

== Hockey ==
=== Men's tournament ===
- Scott Anderson
- Ryan Archibald
- Michael Bevin
- Andrew Buckley
- Hymie Gill
- Dion Gosling
- Bevan Hari
- Andrew Hastie
- Brett Leaver
- Wayne McIndoe
- Umesh Parag
- Mitesh Patel
- Ken Robinson
- Darren Smith
- Andrew Timlin
- Simon Towns

=== Women's tournament ===
- Tina Bell-Kake
- Helen Clarke
- Jenny Duck
- Emily Gillam
- Sandy Hitchcock
- Anna Lawrence
- Robyn Toomey
- Skippy Hamahona
- Suzie Pearce
- Moira Senior
- Jenny Shepherd
- Karen Smith
- Mandy Smith
- Kate Trolove
- Lisa Walton
- Diana Weavers

== Netball ==
With a team captained by Belinda Colling and coached by Yvonne Willering, New Zealand finished as silver medallists in the netball at the 1998 Commonwealth Games, losing 42–39 to Australia in the final. In the group stages, they won all five of their matches and in the semi-finals they defeated England 70–30.

=== Group B ===
14 September 1998	New Zealand	77–41	Malawi

15 September 1998	New Zealand	90–28	Cook Islands

16 September 1998	New Zealand	94–21	Wales

17 September 1998	New Zealand	92–16	Sri Lanka

18 September 1998	New Zealand	63–35	South Africa

Pos	Team	P	W	D	L	GF	GA	GD	Pts
1	New Zealand	5	5	0	0	416	141	+275	10
2	South Africa	5	4	0	1	315	207	+108	8
3	Cook Islands	5	2	1	2	283	330	-47	5
4	Malawi	5	2	0	3	283	270	-13	4
5	Wales	5	1	1	3	220	321	-101	3
6	Sri Lanka	5	0	0	5	157	405	-248	0

Qualified for Semi-final 1
Qualified for Semi-final 2

=== Playoffs ===
Semi-final 2

19 September 1998	New Zealand	70–30	England

Gold Medal Match

21 September 1998	Australia	42–39	New Zealand

=== Squad ===
New Zealand roster
Players
Coaches

Name	Pos	DOB	Height	Club	Nat	Caps
Belinda Charteris	GD	10 May 1972 (aged 26)	1.81 m (5 ft 11 in)	Otago Rebels
Belinda Colling (c)	GA, GS, WA	12 September 1975 (aged 23)	1.78 m (5 ft 10 in)	Otago Rebels
Sonya Hardcastle	C, WA	16 April 1972 (aged 26)	1.72 m (5 ft 8 in)	Northern Force
Donna Loffhagen	GA, GS	29 April 1978 (aged 20)	1.85 m (6 ft 1 in)	Southern Sting
Bernice Mene	GD, GK	18 January 1975 (aged 23)	1.88 m (6 ft 2 in)	Southern Sting
Lesley Nicol	WD, C	9 May 1973 (aged 25)	1.78 m (5 ft 10 in)	Otago Rebels
Anna Rowberry	C, WA, WD	31 March 1976 (aged 22)	1.76 m (5 ft 9 in)	Otago Rebels
Julie Seymour	C, WD	29 March 1971 (aged 27)	1.71 m (5 ft 7 in)	Canterbury Flames
Joanne Steed	GS	20 March 1975 (aged 23)	1.84 m (6 ft 0 in)	Otago Rebels
Lorna Suafoa	GK, GD	7 October 1975 (aged 22)	1.83 m (6 ft 0 in)
Noeline Taurua	GA, WA	26 March 1968 (aged 30)	1.75 m (5 ft 9 in)	Capital Shakers
Linda Vagana	GK, GD	23 July 1971 (aged 27)	1.87 m (6 ft 2 in)	Northern Force

Head coach

- Yvonne Willering

Manager: Sheryl Wells

Notes

- (c) – Captain
- (cc) – Co-captain
- (vc) – Vice-captain
- – Injury / maternity leave
- (TRP) – Temporary Replacement Player

== Officials ==
- Chef de mission – Les Mills
