= Cycling at the 1996 Summer Olympics – Women's time trial =

Cycling at the Olympics

Women's road time trial at the Games of the XXVI Olympiad
- Venues: Buckhead Cycling Course
- Date: 3 August 1996
- Competitors: 24 from 16 nations
- Winning time: 36:40

Medalists
1st place, gold medalist(s)		Zulfiya Zabirova	Russia
2nd place, silver medalist(s)		Jeannie Longo-Ciprelli	France
3rd place, bronze medalist(s)		Clara Hughes	Canada

These are the official results of the Women's Individual Time Trial at the 1996 Summer Olympics in Atlanta, Georgia. There were a total number of 25 participants, with one non-starter, in this inaugural Olympic event over 26 kilometres, held on Saturday August 3, 1996.

== Final classification ==
Rank	Cyclist	Nation	Time
1st place, gold medalist(s)	Zulfiya Zabirova	Russia	00:36.40
2nd place, silver medalist(s)	Jeannie Longo-Ciprelli	France	00:37.00
3rd place, bronze medalist(s)	Clara Hughes	Canada	00:37.13
4.	Kathryn Watt	Australia	00:37.53
5.	Marion Clignet	France	00:38.14
6.	Tea Vikstedt-Nyman	Finland	00:38.24
7.	Jolanta Polikevičiūtė	Lithuania	00:38.27
8.	Imelda Chiappa	Italy	00:38.47
9.	Linda Jackson	Canada	00:38.50
10.	Anna Wilson	Australia	00:38.50
11.	Linda Brenneman	United States	00:38.52
12.	Rasa Polikevičiūtė	Lithuania	00:37.53
13.	Joane Somarriba	Spain	00:38.55
14.	Yvonne McGregor	Great Britain	00:39.09
15.	Diana Rast	Switzerland	00:39.28
16.	Jeanne Golay	United States	00:39.36
17.	Lenka Ilavská	Slovakia	00:39.57
18.	Svetlana Bubnenkova	Russia	00:40.16
19.	Yvonne Brunen	Netherlands	00:40.39
20.	Jacqui Nelson	New Zealand	00:40.58
21.	Sarah Phillips	Great Britain	00:41.16
22.	Rebecca Bailey	New Zealand	00:41.45
23.	Tanja Klein	Austria	00:42.03
24.	Maritza Corredor	Colombia	00:42.06
—	May Hartwell	Norway	DNS

== See also ==
- 1995 UCI Road World Championships - Women's Time Trial
