= New Zealand at the 1994 Commonwealth Games =

- CGF code: NZL
- CGA: New Zealand Olympic and Commonwealth Games Association
- Website: www.olympic.org.nz

in Victoria, British Columbia, Canada
- Competitors: 134
- Flag bearer (opening): Brian Fowler
- Flag bearer (closing): Stephen Petterson
- Officials: 57
- Medals Ranked 8th: Gold 5 Silver 16 Bronze 21 Total 42

Commonwealth Games appearances (overview)
- 1930; 1934; 1938; 1950; 1954; 1958; 1962; 1966; 1970; 1974; 1978; 1982; 1986; 1990; 1994; 1998; 2002; 2006; 2010; 2014; 2018; 2022; 2026; 2030

New Zealand at the 1994 Commonwealth Games was represented by a team of 134 competitors and 57 officials. Selection of the team for the Games in Victoria, British Columbia, was the responsibility of the New Zealand Olympic and Commonwealth Games Association. New Zealand's flagbearer at the opening ceremony was cyclist Brian Fowler, and at the closing ceremony was sports shooter Stephen Petterson. The New Zealand team finished eighth on the medal table, winning a total of 42 medals, 5 of which were gold.

New Zealand has competed in every games, starting with the British Empire Games in 1930 at Hamilton, Ontario.

== Medal tables ==
Medal	Name	Sport	Event
Gold	Mark Rendell	Cycling	Men's road race
Gold	Katie Portas	Lawn bowls	Women's visually impaired singles
Gold	Lindsay Arthur; Stephen Petterson	Shooting	Men's 50 m rifle prone pairs
Gold	Stephen Petterson	Shooting	Men's 50 m rifle prone
Gold	Danyon Loader	Swimming	Men's 200 m butterfly
Silver	Beatrice Faumuina	Athletics	Women's discus throw
Silver	Kirsten Hellier	Athletics	Women's javelin throw
Silver	Courtney Ireland	Athletics	Men's shot put
Silver	Brian Fowler	Cycling	Men's road race
Silver	Glen McLeay	Cycling	Men's 10 mile scratch race
Silver	Jacqui Nelson	Cycling	Women's point race
Silver	Sarah Ulmer	Cycling	Women's 3000 m individual pursuit
Silver	Gerd Barkman; Jocelyn Lees	Shooting	Women's 10 m air pistol pairs
Silver	Geoffrey Jukes; Brian Thomson	Shooting	Open skeet pairs
Silver	Julian Lawton; Greg Yelavich	Shooting	Men's free pistol pairs
Silver	Geoffrey Smith	Shooting	Open fullbore rifle Queen's Prize
Silver	Trent Bray	Swimming	Men's 200 m freestyle
Silver	Trent Bray; Danyon Loader; John Steel; Nick Tongue	Swimming	Men's 4 × 100 m freestyle relay
Silver	Trent Bray; Guy Callaghan; Danyon Loader; John Steel	Swimming	Men's 4 × 200 m freestyle relay
Silver	Danyon Loader	Swimming	Men's 400 m freestyle
Silver	Anna Simcic	Swimming	Women's 200 m backstroke
Bronze	Gavin Lovegrove	Athletics	Men's javelin throw
Bronze	Ben Lucas	Athletics	Men's wheelchair marathon
Bronze	Scott Nelson	Athletics	Men's 30 km walk
Bronze	Nick Hall	Badminton	Men's singles
Bronze	Rhona Robertson	Badminton	Women's singles
Bronze	Peter Belliss; Rowan Brassey; Stewart Buttar; Bruce McNish	Lawn bowls	Men's fours
Bronze	Marlene Castle; Colleen Ferrick; Adrienne Lambert; Ann Muir	Lawn bowls	Women's fours
Bronze	Craig Nolan	Lawn bowls	Men's visually impaired singles
Bronze	Kalolo Fiaui	Boxing	Men's lightweight
Bronze	Trevor Shailer	Boxing	Men's light welterweight
Bronze	Brendon Cameron; Julian Dean; Glen Thomson; Lee Vertongen	Cycling	Men's 4000 m team pursuit
Bronze	Brian Fowler; Paul Leitch; Tim Pawson; Mark Rendell	Cycling	Men's team time trial
Bronze	Jacqui Nelson	Cycling	Women's 3000 m individual pursuit
Bronze	Donna Wynd	Cycling	Women's sprint
Bronze	Sarah Thompson	Gymnastics	Women's asymmetric bars
Bronze	Paul Carmine	Shooting	Men's 10 m rifle running target
Bronze	Paul Carmine; Tony Clarke (sport shooter)	Shooting	Men's 10 m rifle running target pairs
Bronze	Greg Yelavich	Shooting	Men's 10 m air pistol
Bronze	Greg Yelavich	Shooting	Men's 25 m centre fire pistol
Bronze	Danyon Loader	Swimming	Men's 200 m freestyle
Bronze	Sean Tretheway	Swimming	Men's 100 m freestyle

Medals by sport
Sport	Gold medal	Silver medal	Bronze medal	Total
Shooting	2	4	4	10
Swimming	1	5	2	8
Cycling	1	4	4	9
Lawn bowls	1	0	3	4
Athletics	0	3	3	6
Badminton	0	0	2	2
Boxing	0	0	2	2
Gymnastics	0	0	1	1
Total	5	16	21	42

Medals by gender
Gender	Gold medal	Silver medal	Bronze medal	Total
Male	4	8	16	28
Female	1	6	5	12
Mixed / open	0	2	0	2
Total	5	16	21	42

== Competitors ==
The following table lists the number of New Zealand competitors who participated at the Games according to gender and sport.

Sport	Men	Women	Total
Athletics	15	13	28
Badminton	3	4	7
Boxing	4	—N/a	4
Cycling	16	7	23
Diving	0	2	2
Gymnastics	2	7	9
Lawn bowls	8	8	16
Shooting	17	4	21
Swimming	11	6	17
Synchronised swimming	—N/a	1	1
Weightlifting	2	—N/a	2
Wrestling	4	—N/a	4
Total	82	52	134

== Officials ==
- Team manager – Dave Gerrard
- Assistant team managers – Tony Popplewell, Katie Sadleir
- Administration officer – Jane Sheetz
- Medical director – Tony Edwards
- Doctors – Chris Milne, Ruth Highet
- Chief physiotherapist – Duncan Reid
- Physiotherapists – Chris McCullough, Jane Bradshaw, Louise Johnson
- Massage therapist – Bruce Towart
- Chiropractor – Clive Hill
- Psychologist – Ken Hodge
- Athletics
  - Section manager – Dave Norris
  - Chief coach – John Tylden
  - Throws coach – Mene Mene
  - Assistant throws coach – Debbie Strange
  - Middle-distance coach – Bruce Milne
  - Multis coach – Terry Lomax
  - Sprints coach – Ian Ferguson
- Badminton
  - Section manager – Chris Tapper
  - Coach – Chris Bullen
- Boxing section manager and coach – Sinbad Iva
- Cycling
  - Section manager – Gavin Stevens
  - Road coach – Gary Bell
  - Women's coach – Graeme Hunn
  - Track coach – Dick Johnstone
  - Assistant track coach – Jack Broome
  - Mechanics – Ian Johnstone, Kelvin Gordon
- Gymnastics
  - Section manager – Marie Hammond
  - Men's artistic coach – David Lutterman
  - Women's artistic coach – Lyn Johnson
  - Rhythmic coach – Diliana Klintcharova
- Lawn bowls
  - Section manager (men) – Mal Morrison
  - Section manager (women) – Joan Leach
  - Coach – John Murtagh
- Shooting
  - Section manager – Graeme Smith
  - Fullbore manager and coach – John Hastie
  - Smallbore coach – Ian Pottinger
  - Running target coach – David Sheeley
  - Skeet / trench coach – Graeme Webber
  - Pistol coach – John Howat
- Swimming
  - Section manager – Jackie Clarke
  - Head coach – Mark Bone
  - Assistant coaches – Duncan Laing, Pic Parkhouse, Ross Anderson
  - Diving coach – Chang Yang
  - Synchronised swimming coach – Synette Aitchison
- Weightlifting section manager and coach – Doug McConnell
- Wrestling
  - Section manager and coach – Graeme Hawkins
  - Assistant coach – Tony Clark

== See also ==
- New Zealand Olympic Committee
- New Zealand at the Commonwealth Games
- New Zealand at the 1992 Summer Olympics
- New Zealand at the 1996 Summer Olympics
