= Cycling at the 1996 Summer Olympics – Women's individual road race =

Cycling at the Olympics

Women's road race at the Games of the XXVI Olympiad
- Venue: Atlanta
- Date: July 21
- Competitors: 58 from 31 nations
- Winning time: 02:36:13

Medalists
1st place, gold medalist(s)		Jeannie Longo; France
2nd place, silver medalist(s)		Imelda Chiappa; Italy
3rd place, bronze medalist(s)		Clara Hughes; Canada

These are the official results of the Women's Individual Road Race at the 1996 Summer Olympics in Atlanta, Georgia, held on July 21, 1996. There were 58 participants in the race over 104 km, with fifteen cyclists who did not finish.

== Final classification ==
Rank	Cyclist	Nation	Time
1st place, gold medalist(s)	Jeannie Longo-Ciprelli	France	02:36:13
2nd place, silver medalist(s)	Imelda Chiappa	Italy	+ 25"
3rd place, bronze medalist(s)	Clara Hughes	Canada	+ 31"
4.	Vera Hohlfeld	Germany	+ 53"
5.	Jolanta Polikevičiūtė	Lithuania	s.t.
6.	Zulfiya Zabirova	Russia	s.t.
7.	Alessandra Cappellotto	Italy	s.t.
8.	Barbara Heeb	Switzerland	s.t.
9.	Kathryn Watt	Australia	s.t.
10.	Susan Palmer	Canada	s.t.
11.	Marie Purvis	Great Britain	s.t.
12.	Rasa Polikevičiūtė	Lithuania	s.t.
13.	Yvonne Schnorf	Switzerland	s.t.
14.	Zinaida Stahurskaya	Belarus	s.t.
15.	Diana Rast	Switzerland	s.t.
16.	Catherine Marsal	France	s.t.
17.	Anna Wilson	Australia	s.t.
18.	Ragnhild Kostøl	Norway	s.t.
19.	Sarah Phillips	Great Britain	s.t.
20.	Heidi Van De Vijver	Belgium	s.t.
21.	Joane Somarriba	Spain	s.t.
22.	Tanja Klein	Austria	s.t.
23.	Ana Barros	Portugal	s.t.
24.	Lenka Ilavská	Slovakia	s.t.
25.	Susanne Ljungskog	Sweden	s.t.
26.	Yvonne Brunen	Netherlands	s.t.
27.	Eva Orvošová	Slovakia	s.t.
28.	Elsbeth Vink	Netherlands	s.t.
29.	Jeanne Golay	United States	s.t.
30.	Natalya Kishchuk	Ukraine	s.t.
31.	Susy Pryde	New Zealand	s.t.
32.	Roberta Bonanomi	Italy	s.t.
33.	Rebecca Bailey	New Zealand	s.t.
34.	Tea Vikstedt-Nyman	Finland	s.t.
35.	Erica Green	South Africa	+ 1' 03"
36.	Linda Brenneman	United States	+ 4' 14"
37.	Alison Dunlap	United States	+ 5' 08"
38.	Marion Clignet	France	+ 5' 37"
39.	Tracey Watson	Australia	+ 6' 22"
40.	Fátima Blázquez	Spain	+ 10' 14"
41.	Guo Xinghong	China	+ 13' 34"
42.	Jacqueline Martin	South Africa	+ 16' 59"
43.	Caroline Alexander	Great Britain	+ 17' 34"
—	Linda Jackson	Canada	DNF
—	Zhao Haijuan	China	DNF
—	Dania Pérez	Cuba	DNF
—	Camille Solis	Belize	DNF
—	Svetlana Samokhvalova	Russia	DNF
—	Ingunn Bollerud	Norway	DNF
—	Alla Vasilenko	Kazakhstan	DNF
—	Diana Žiliūtė	Lithuania	DNF
—	Jacqui Nelson	New Zealand	DNF
—	Maureen Kaila	El Salvador	DNF
—	Maritza Corredor	Colombia	DNF
—	Ingrid Haringa	Netherlands	DNF
—	Kim Yong-mi	South Korea	DNF
—	Svetlana Bubnenkova	Russia	DNF
—	Izaskun Bengoa	Spain	DNF

== See also ==
- Men's Individual Road Race
