= Cycling at the 1996 Summer Olympics – Women's points race =

Cycling at the Olympics

Women's points race at the Games of the XXVI Olympiad
- Venue: Stone Mountain Velodrome
- Date: 28 July 1996
- Competitors: 23 from 23 nations
- Winning score: 24 (0 laps behind)

Medalists
1st place, gold medalist(s)		Nathalie Lancien	France
2nd place, silver medalist(s)		Ingrid Haringa	Netherlands
3rd place, bronze medalist(s)		Lucy Tyler-Sharman	Australia

These are the official results of the Women's Points Race at the 1996 Summer Olympics in Atlanta, United States. The event debuted at these Games.

== Medalists ==
Gold:	Silver:	Bronze:
Nathalie Lancien France	Ingrid Haringa Netherlands	Lucy Tyler-Sharman Australia

== Race ==
#	Athlete	NOC	Points
Gold medal	Nathalie Even-Lancien	France	24
Silver medal	Ingrid Haringa	Netherlands	23
Bronze medal	Lucy Tyler-Sharman	Australia	17
4	Svetlana Samokhvalova	Russia	14
5	Maureen Kaila	El Salvador	11
6	Liudmila Garajànskaia	Belarus	11
7	Tea Vikstedt-Nyman	Finland	9
8	Jacqui Nelson	New Zealand	8
9	Seiko Hashimoto	Japan	7
10	Nada Cristofoli	Italy	6
11	Belem Guerrero	Mexico	4
12	Alla Vasilenko	Kazakhstan	2
13	Judith Arndt	Germany	2
14	Maria Lawrence	Great Britain	1
15	Daniela Larreal	Venezuela	0
16	Tanja Klein	Austria	0
17	Jeanne Golay	United States	0
18	Dania Pérez	Cuba	0
–	Wang Yan	China	Retired
–	Kim Yong-Mi	South Korea	Retired
–	May Britt Hartwell	Norway	Retired
–	Izaskun Bengoa	Spain	Retired
–	Rita Razmaitė	Lithuania	Retired
