= Cycling at the 2000 Summer Olympics – Women's individual road race =

Cycling at the Olympics

Women's cycling road race at the Games of the XXVII Olympiad
- Venue: Centennial Parklands, Sydney
- Date: 26 September
- Competitors: 57 from 23 nations
- Winning time: 3:06:31

Medalists
1st place, gold medalist(s)		Leontien Zijlaard; Netherlands
2nd place, silver medalist(s)		Hanka Kupfernagel; Germany
3rd place, bronze medalist(s)		Diana Žiliūtė; Lithuania

The women's road race was one of the cycling events at the 2000 Summer Olympics. The race was held on Tuesday, 26 September 2000 with a race distance of 119.7 km. Because the top three were so close there was a photo finish.

== Results ==
Final classification

RANK	CYCLIST	NATION	TIME
1	Leontien Zijlaard	Netherlands	3:06:31
2	Hanka Kupfernagel	Germany	—
3	Diana Žiliūtė	Lithuania	—
4	Anna Willson	Australia	—
5	Svetlana Bubnenkova	Russia	—
6	Magali le Floc'h	France	—
7	Zoulfia Zabirova	Russia	—
8	Heide van de Vijver	Belgium	—
9	Yvonne Schnorf	Switzerland	—
10	Sara Symington	Great Britain	—
11	Genevieve Jeanson	Canada	—
12	Mirjam Melchers	Netherlands	—
13	Rasa Polikevičiūtė	Lithuania	—
14	Joane Somarriba Arrola	Spain	—
15	Alessandra Cappellotto	Italy	—
16	Nicole Brändli	Switzerland	—
17	Tetyana Styazhkina	Ukraine	—
18	Jacinta Coleman	New Zealand	—
19	Oksana Saprykina	Ukraine	—
20	Cindy Pieters	Belgium	—
21	Pia Sundstedt	Finland	—
22	Lyne Bessette	Canada	—
23	Tracey Gaudry	Australia	—
24	Yvonne McGregor	Great Britain	—
25	Edita Pučinskaitė	Lithuania	+ 0:06
26	Jeannie Longo-Ciprelli	France	—
27	Ceris Gilfillan	Great Britain	—
28	Juanita Feldhahn	Australia	—
29	Monica Valen	Norway	+ 1:31
30	Petra Rossner	Germany	+ 2:46
31	Valeria Cappellotto	Italy	—
32	Priska Doppmann	Switzerland	+ 3:46
33	Valentyna Karpenko	Ukraine	+ 4:02
34	Fatima Blazquez Lozano	Spain	—
35	Ingunn Bollerud	Norway	—
36	Roz Reekie-May	New Zealand	+ 4:03
37	Chantal Beltman	Netherlands	—
38	Solrun Flatås	Norway	+ 4:33
39	Catherine Marsal	France	—
40	Vanja Vonckx	Belgium	+ 6:09
41	Miho Oki	Japan	—
42	Olga Slioussareva	Russia	+ 6:56
43	Clara Hughes	Canada	+ 10:18
44	Cláudia Carceroni-Saintagne	Brazil	+ 17:48
45	Chen Chiung-Yi	Chinese Taipei	+ 21:29
46	Dania Perez	Cuba	+ 21:57
47	Nicole Freedman	United States	—
48	Maria Cagigas	Spain	+ 21:58
49	Janildas Silva	Brazil	+ 28:41
	Yoanka González	Cuba	DNF
	Ina-Yoko Teutenberg	Germany	DNF
	Deirdre Murphy	Ireland	DNF
	Roberta Bonanomi	Italy	DNF
	Susy Pryde	New Zealand	DNF
	Bianca Jane Netzler	Samoa	DNF
	Mari Holden	United States	DNF
	Karen Kurreck	United States	DNF
