= Cycling at the 1992 Summer Olympics – Women's individual pursuit =

These are the official results of the Women's Individual Pursuit at the 1992 Summer Olympics in Barcelona, Spain. The races were held on July 30, and July 31, 1992 at the Velòdrom d'Hortawith a race distance of 3 km. This was the Olympic debut of this event for the women.

== Medalists ==
Gold:	Silver:	Bronze:
Petra Rossner (GER)	Kathy Watt (AUS)	Rebecca Twigg (USA)

== Results ==
- Q Denotes qualified for next round.
- q Denotes qualified for classification round.
- OVTK Denotes overtaken by opponent during heat.
- CAP Denotes captured your opponent.
- DNS Denotes did not start.
- WR Denotes New world record.
- OR Denotes New Olympic record

== Qualifying round ==
Held, July 30

The seventeen riders raced against each other in matches of two. Qualification for the next round was not based on who won those matches, however. The cyclists with the eight fastest times advanced to the quarter-finals, regardless of whether they won or lost their match.

Pos.	Athlete	NOC	Time	Ave. Speed	Qual.	Notes
1	Kathy Watt	Australia	3:41.886	48.673 km/h	Q	OR
2	Petra Rossner	Germany	3:43.091	48.410 km/h	Q	
3	Rebecca Twigg	United States	3:43.218	48.383 km/h	Q	
4	Svetlana Samokhvalova	Unified Team	3:43.326	48.359 km/h	Q	
5	Hanne Malmberg	Denmark	3:45.230	47.950 km/h	Q	
6	Jeannie Longo	France	3:46.935	47.590 km/h	Q	
7	Leontien van Moorsel	Netherlands	3:46.956	47.586 km/h	Q	OR
8	Tea Vikstedt-Nyman	Finland	3:47.516	47.469 km/h	Q	
9	Kristel Werckx	Belgium	3:50.051	46.946 km/h		
10	Jacqui Nelson	New Zealand	3:51.259	46.700 km/h		
11	Seiko Hashimoto	Japan	3:51.674	46.617 km/h		OR
12	Gabriella Pregnolato	Italy	3:52.376	46.476 km/h		
13	Aiga Zagorska	Lithuania	3:52.450	46.461 km/h		
14	Kelly-Ann Way	Canada	3:54.284	46.097 km/h		
15	Zhou Lingmei	China	4:04.085	44.247 km/h		
16	Olga Sacasa	Nicaragua	4:32.671	39.608 km/h		OR
-	Margaret Bean	Guam	OVTK			

== Quarter-finals ==
Held July 30
In the first round of actual match competition, cyclists were seeded into matches based on their times from the qualifying round. The winners of the four heats of advanced to the semi-finals.

Heat 1

Pos.	Athlete	NOC	Time	Ave. Speed	Qual.
1	Hanne Malmberg	Denmark	3:46.959	47.585 km/h	Q
2	Svetlana Samokhvalova	Unified Team	3:47.444	47.484 km/h	

Heat 2

Pos.	Athlete	NOC	Time	Ave. Speed	Qual.
1	Rebecca Twigg	United States	3:46.508	47.680 km/h	Q
2	Jeannie Longo	France	3:46.547	47.672 km/h	

Heat 3

Pos.	Athlete	NOC	Time	Ave. Speed	Qual.	Notes
1	Petra Rossner	Germany	3:41.509	48.756 km/h	Q	OR
2	Leontien van Moorsel	Netherlands	3:49.795	46.998 km/h		

Heat 4

Pos.	Athlete	NOC	Time	Ave. Speed	Qual.
1	Kathy Watt	Australia	3:45.305	47.935 km/h	Q
2	Tea Vikstedt-Nyman	Finland	3:48.918	47.178 km/h	

== Semi-finals ==
Held July 31
The winner of the two heats advance to the finals, for the gold medal. The loser with the fastest semi-final time wins the bronze.

Heat 1

Pos.	Athlete	NOC	Time	Ave. Speed	Qual.
1	Kathy Watt	Australia	3:49.790	46.999 km/h	Q
2	Rebecca Twigg	United States	3:52.429	46.465 km/h	

Heat 2

Pos.	Athlete	NOC	Time	Ave. Speed	Qual.
1	Petra Rossner	Germany	3:48.517	47.261 km/h	Q
2	Hanne Malmberg	Denmark	3:53.516	46.249 km/h	

== Final ==
Held July 31

Pos.	Athlete	NOC	Time	Ave. Speed
1	Petra Rossner	Germany	3:41.753	48.702 km/h
2	Kathy Watt	Australia	3:43.438	48.335 km/h

=== Final classification ===
	Final results	
Pos.	Athlete	NOC
1.	Petra Rossner	Germany
2.	Kathy Watt	Australia
3.	Rebecca Twigg	United States
4.	Hanne Malmberg	Denmark
5.	Jeannie Longo	France
6.	Svetlana Samokhvalova	Unified Team
7.	Tea Vikstedt-Nyman	Finland
8.	Leontien van Moorsel	Netherlands
