= Jacinta Coleman =

New Zealand cyclist (1974–2017)

Jacinta Gray
Personal information
- Born: Jacinta Joan Coleman; 17 July 1974 Auckland, New Zealand
- Died: 27 June 2017 (aged 42) Tauranga, New Zealand
- Height: 167 cm (5 ft 6 in)
- Weight: 55 kg (121 lb)

Cycling career
- Sport: Cycling
- Discipline: Road cycling

Jacinta Joan Gray (née Coleman, 17 July 1974 – 27 June 2017) was a New Zealand road cyclist who represented her country at the 1998 Commonwealth Games and the 2000 Summer Olympics.

== Early life and family ==
Born in Auckland on 17 July 1974, Gray was the daughter of Brian and Sandra Coleman. She married Australian cyclist Jay Sweet and they had one son, but later divorced. In 2009, she married James Gray, and the couple had two children.

== Cycling ==
She took up cycling at the beginning of 1995, and made rapid progress in the sport. Gray rode for New Zealand in the women's road race at the 1998 Commonwealth Games in Kuala Lumpur, finishing in 10th place. In the women's individual road race at the 2000 Summer Olympics in Sydney, Gray finished 18th out of 57 starters.

== Death ==
Gray died from bowel cancer in Tauranga on 27 June 2017.
