= 1995 UCI Road World Championships – Women's time trial =

Women's Individual Time Trial
1995 UCI Road World Championships
- Rainbow jersey

Race details
- Dates: 4 October 1995 in (Colombia) Duitama (COL)
- Stages: 1
- Distance: 26.1 km (16.2 mi)
- Winning time: 44' 27"

Medalists
	Gold	Jeannie Longo (FRA)
	Silver	Clara Hughes (CAN)
	Bronze	Kathryn Watt (AUS)

The Women's Individual Time Trial at the 1995 World Cycling Championships was held on Wednesday October 4, 1995, in Tunja / Duitama, Colombia, over a total distance of 26.1 kilometres. There were a total number of 44 competitors, with one rider who did not reach the finish line and four non-starters.

The women's individual time trial (ITT) was added to the world championships last year (1994). It replaces the team time trial.

== Final classification ==
Rank	Rider	Country	Time
1st place, gold medalist(s)	Jeannie Longo	France	44' 27"
2nd place, silver medalist(s)	Clara Hughes	Canada	+ 1' 11"
3rd place, bronze medalist(s)	Kathryn Watt	Australia	+ 1' 25"
4	Valentina Polkhanova	Russia	+ 2' 35"
5	Karen Kurreck	United States	+ 2' 50"
6	Jeanne Golay	United States	+ 3' 15"
7	Catherine Marsal	France	+ 3' 25"
8	Zulfiya Zabirova	Russia	+ 3' 26"
9	Maritza Corredor	Colombia	+ 4' 42"
10	Tea Vikstedt-Nyman	Finland	+ 5' 16"
11	Jolanta Polikevičiūtė	Lithuania	+ 5' 23"
12	Rebecca Bailey	New Zealand	+ 5' 39"
13	Yvonne McGregor	United Kingdom	+ 5' 39"
14	Maria Jongeling	Netherlands	+ 5' 41"
15	Dede Barry	United States	+ 5' 49"
16	Judith Arndt	Germany	+ 5' 56"
17	Rasa Polikevičiūtė	Lithuania	+ 6' 34"
18	Petra Rossner	Germany	+ 6' 34"
19	Susanne Ljungskog	Sweden	+ 6' 42"
20	Imelda Chiappa	Italy	+ 6' 44"
21	Anne Samplonius	Canada	+ 6' 51"
22	Teodora Ruano	Spain	+ 7' 35"
23	Valentina Karpenko	Ukraine	+ 7' 36"
24	Jacqui Nelson	New Zealand	+ 7' 50"
25	Belem Guerrero	Mexico	+ 8' 14"
26	Tracey Watson	Australia	+ 8' 25"
27	Zinayda Stagourskaya	Belarus	+ 8' 34"
28	Maureen Vergara	El Salvador	+ 8' 44"
29	Wang Qingzhi	China	+ 8' 46"
30	Lenka Ilavská	Slovakia	+ 8' 59"
31	Meike de Bruijn	Netherlands	+ 9' 08"
32	Cabre Florencio	Spain	+ 9' 22"
33	Oxana Golberg	Kazakhstan	+ 9' 26"
34	Elena Malikova	Bulgaria	+ 9' 31"
35	Ma Huizhen	China	+ 9' 39"
36	Elena Tchalykh	Russia	+ 9' 48"
37	Consuelo Giraldo	Colombia	+ 10' 17"
38	Patricia Santiago	Argentina	+ 12' 06"
39	Alla Vassilenko	Kazakhstan	+ 13' 15"
—	Rolangela Mestrinel	Brazil	DNF
—	Mi Young-Kang	South Korea	DNS
—	Yi-Wen Lu	Chinese Taipei	DNS
—	Chung Mi-Song	South Korea	DNS
—	Camille Solis	Belize	DNS
