= WCCC =

WCCC may refer to:

- WCCC (FM), a radio station (106.9 FM) licensed to serve Hartford, Connecticut, United States
- WNWW, a radio station (1290 AM) licensed to serve West Hartford, Connecticut, which held the call sign WCCC from 1947 to 2002 and from 2007 to 2016
- Warren County Community College
- Warwickshire County Cricket Club, a county cricket team from England
- Washington County Community College in Calais, Maine, United States
- Weak cosmic censorship hypothesis
- World Constitution Coordinating Committee
- Western Collegiate Cycling Conference
- Westmoreland County Community College, in Hempfield Township, Pennsylvania, United States
- Wilkinson County Correctional Center, a prison in Wilkinson County, Mississippi, United States
- Willow Creek Community Church, a church in South Barrington, Illinois, United States
- Women's Community Correctional Center, a women's prison in Honolulu County, Hawai'i.
- Worcestershire County Cricket Club, a county cricket team from England
- World Computer Chess Championship
- World Covered Court Championships, a tennis tournament
