= Cycling at the 1998 Central American and Caribbean Games =

This page shows the results of the cycling competition at the 1998 Central American and Caribbean Games, held on 8 to 17 August 1998 in Maracaibo, Venezuela. Track events were held at the UCI not approved José Pachencho Romero stadium, also velodrome.

== Medal summary ==
=== Men's events ===
Event	Gold	Silver	Bronze
1 km Time Trial	Julio Herrera (CUB)	Michael Phillips (TRI)	Yosvani Poll (CUB)
Sprint	Barry Forde (BAR)	Julio Herrera (CUB)	Stephen Alfred (TRI)
Team Sprint	Colombia; John García; John Ramírez; Marco Ríos	Trinidad and Tobago; Stephen Alfred; Clinton Grant; Michael Phillips	Cuba; Julio Herrera; Yosvani Poll; Reiner Súarez
4000m Individual Pursuit	Jairo Pérez (COL)	Arlex Méndez (VEN)	Iosvany Gutiérrez (CUB)
4000m Team Pursuit	Cuba; Héctor Ajete; Iosvany Gutiérrez; Reynaldo Rodríguez; Luis Romero	Venezuela; Tomás Gil; Miguel Ubeto; Isaac Cañizales; Carlos Blanco	Colombia; John García; Luis Felipe Laverde; Yovanny López; Alexander Moncaleano
Points Race	Víctor Herrera (COL)	Yoel Mariño (CUB)	Luis Martínez (MEX)
Keirin	Héctor Rodríguez (VEN)	Alexander Cornieles (VEN)	Jonh González (COL)
Madison	Colombia; John García; John Ramírez	Venezuela; Isaac Cañizales; Arlex Méndez	Trinidad and Tobago; Richard Dickie; Sheldon Serrao
Road Race	Pedro Pérez (CUB)	Manuel Carvajal (MEX)	Irving Aguilar (MEX)
Road Time Trial	Marlon Pérez Arango (COL)	Albin Tabares (VEN)	Pedro Pérez (CUB)

=== Women's events ===
Event	Gold	Silver	Bronze
500m Time Trial	Yumari González (CUB) (Note: Nancy Contreras won the 500m Time trial, but failed a doping control with Pseudoephedrine.)	Daniela Larreal (VEN)	Suzel Curbela (CUB)
Sprint	Daniela Larreal (VEN)	Yumari González (CUB)	Suzel Curbela (CUB)
3000m Individual Pursuit	María Luisa Calle (COL)	Dania Pérez (CUB)	Yoanka González (CUB) (Note: Belem Guerrero won the bronze medal in 3000m Individual Pursuit, but failed a doping control with Pseudoephedrine.)
Points Race	Maureen Kaila (ESA) (Note: Belem Guerrero won the points race, but failed a doping control with Pseudoephedrine.)	Dania Pérez (CUB)	Daniela Larreal (VEN)
Road Race	Madelín Jorge (CUB)	Yoanka González (CUB)	Maureen Kaila (ESA) (Note: Belem Guerrero won the bronze medal in road race, but failed a doping control with Pseudoephedrine.)
Road Time Trial	Maureen Kaila (ESA)	Madelín Jorge (CUB)	Yulier Rodríguez (CUB)
