= Yvonne McGregor =

English cyclist

Yvonne McGregor MBE
Personal information
- Full name: Yvonne McGregor
- Born: 9 April 1961 (age 65) England; United Kingdom

Cycling career
- Sport: Cycling
- Disciplines: Track & Road
- Role: Rider
- Rider type: Time triallist

Major wins
- World Champion, pursuit (2000)
Medal record
Women's track cycling
Representing Great Britain
Olympic Games
Bronze medal – third place	2000 Sydney	3,000m pursuit
World Championships
Gold medal – first place	2000 Manchester	3,000m pursuit
Bronze medal – third place	1997 Perth	3,000m pursuit
Representing England
Commonwealth Games
Gold medal – first place	1994 Victoria	points
Bronze medal – third place	1998 Kuala Lumpur	3,000m pursuit
Women's road bicycle racing
Representing England
Commonwealth Games
Bronze medal – third place	1994 Victoria	team time trial

Yvonne McGregor MBE (born 9 April 1961) is a female English former professional cyclist from Wibsey. She was made an MBE, for services to cycling, in the 2002 New Year Honours.

== Cycling career ==
McGregor competed in running until the age of 28, coming eighth at the 1988 world fell running championship, and did not ride a bicycle until she was 17. She started cycling competitively in triathlon, finishing third in the British championship in 1990, and focused on it when she injured her Achilles tendon. In 1993 she broke Beryl Burton's 20-year-old British 10 mile time-trial record with 21 minutes 15 seconds. She scored her first major success when she won the points race at the 1994 Commonwealth Games in Victoria, Canada.

On 17 June 1995 in Manchester she set an hour record for women at 47.411 km. McGregor broke Burton's 25-mile time-trial record in 1996, setting 51 minutes 30 seconds. She missed out on a medal at the 1996 Summer Olympics in Atlanta, finishing fourth in the pursuit. However she took the bronze in the same event at the 2000 Summer Olympics in Sydney, thus winning the first Olympic Medal in any cycling discipline by a female British rider. She then won the pursuit at the 2000 UCI Track Cycling World Championships in Manchester less than two months later.

Following changes to the hour record which disallowed the bike and position she used to set the record in 1995, McGregor set a European and sea-level hour record of 43.689 km on 13 April 2002. This remained the British record until Sarah Storey surpassed it in 2015. This ended McGregor's competitive cycling career. Since retiring she has worked as a sports massage therapist.

== Palmarès ==
1994
Commonwealth Games

1st Points race
3rd Team time trial (with Maxine Johnson, Maria Lawrence and Julia Freeman)

1st (United Kingdom) Pursuit, British National Track Championships
1st British Best All-Rounder

1995
World Hour record: 47.411 km
1st (United Kingdom) Pursuit, British National Track Championships

1996
1st (United Kingdom) Pursuit, British National Track Championships

1997
1st (United Kingdom) Pursuit, British National Track Championships
3rd Pursuit, UCI Track World Championships, Women
3rd Round 4, 1997 UCI Track Cycling World Cup Classics

1998
1st (United Kingdom) Pursuit, British National Track Championships
3rd Pursuit, 1998 Commonwealth Games

1999
1st (United Kingdom) Pursuit, British National Track Championships
2nd British National Road Race Championships

2000
1st Pursuit, UCI Track World Championships, Women
1st (United Kingdom) Pursuit, British National Track Championships
3rd Pursuit, Summer Olympics
3rd British National Road Race Championships
3rd British National Time Trial Championships
2nd Mexico Round, 2000 UCI Track Cycling World Cup Classics

2001
1st (United Kingdom) British National Time Trial Championships
2nd Pursuit, British National Track Championships
