= Sonya Hardcastle =

New Zealand netball player

Personal information
- Born: 16 April 1972 (age 54) New Zealand
- Height: 1.72 m (5 ft 8 in)

Netball career
- Playing positions: C, WA
Years	Club team	Apps
1998–99, 2001	Northern Force	
Years	National team	Caps
1992, 1997–99	New Zealand	
Medal record
Representing New Zealand
World Netball Championships
Silver medal – second place	1999 Christchurch	Netball
Commonwealth Games
Silver medal – second place	1998 Kuala Lumpur	Team
- Updated on 26 March 2010

Sonya Hardcastle (born 16 April 1972) is a former New Zealand netball international.

An attacking midcourt player, Hardcastle was first selected for the New Zealand national netball team, the Silver Ferns, in 1992. She sustained a back injury the following year, which kept her out of the 1993 World Games. Outside of netball, Hardcastle was stalked several times during her early international career. After taking time out to focus on studies, Hardcastle rejoined the Silver Ferns in 1997, and went on to win silver medals at the Netball at the 1998 Commonwealth Games and 1999 Netball World Championships.

With the start of the Coca-Cola Cup (later the National Bank Cup) in 1998, Hardcastle signed with the Northern Force; having moved to live in Invercargill, she also started playing provincial netball for Southland. She announced her retirement from all forms of netball after 1999, although she played again with the Northern Force in 2001; she also made a surprise return to play with North Harbour in the 2008 provincial netball season.

Her sisters Nadine and Rochelle also played alongside Sonya in domestic netball, with Rochelle joining her in the Northern Force. Her mother is also a coach with Netball North Harbour.
