= Eastern Collegiate Cycling Conference =

ECCC Logo

The ECCC or Eastern Collegiate Cycling Conference is a collegiate cycling conference based in the north east United States. The conference encompasses 71 colleges within Connecticut, Delaware, Maine, Massachusetts, New Hampshire, New Jersey, New York, Pennsylvania, Rhode Island, and Vermont. Teams from some Canadian universities in Quebec and Ontario also compete in the ECCC. The primary goal is to facilitate bicycle racing, with mountain bike racing and cyclo-cross races in the fall and road bicycle races in the spring. The conference is governed by the National Collegiate Cycling Association (NCCA), a division of USA Cycling.

== Participating Clubs ==
- UMass Cycling Club
- Bucknell University Cycling Team
