= Tanja Klein =

Austrian cyclist

Personal information
- Full name: Tanja Klein
- Born: 20 November 1969 (age 56) Munich, Germany
- Height: 175 cm (5 ft 9 in)
- Weight: 60 kg (132 lb)

Cycling career
- Sport: Cycling
- Disciplines: Road cycling, Track cycling
- Role: Rider

Tanja Klein (born 20 November 1969 in Munich, Germany) is a track and road cyclist who represented Austria. She competed at the 1996 Summer Olympics on the road in the women's road race and women's trial and on the track in the women's points race. She won the Austrian National Road Race Championships in 1995, 1996 and 1998.
