= Andrea Hannos =

Canadian cyclist (born 1973)

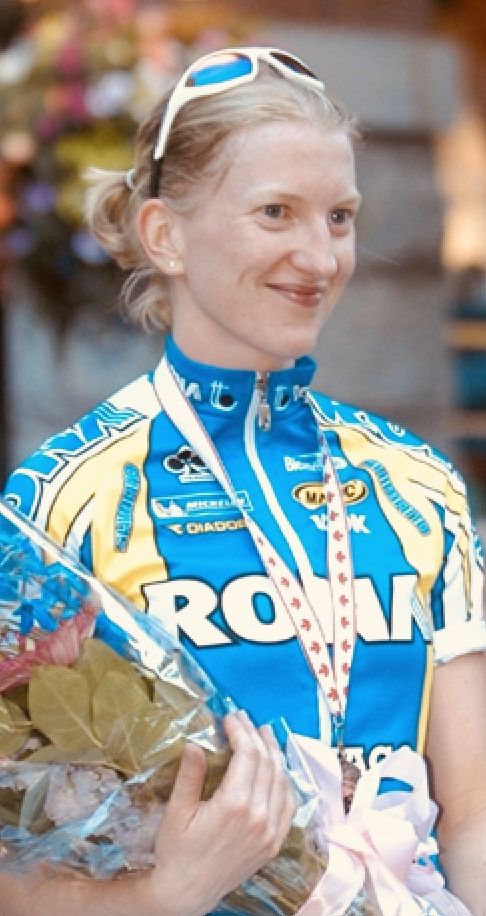
- Hannos at the 2003 Global Relay Gastown Grand Prix

Personal information
- Born: May 8, 1973 (age 53) Vancouver, British Columbia, Canada

Cycling career
- Sport: Cycling
- Disciplines: Road, Track
- Role: Rider
- Rider type: All-rounder

Amateur team
- Canadian National Team

Professional teams
- 2000: Intersports
- 2001: Verizon Wireless
- 2002–2004: Équipe Cycliste RONA

Andrea Hannos (born May 8, 1973) is a former Canadian professional road and track racing cyclist who first entered sport in track and field, specializing in the long and triple jump. She attended high school at Little Flower Academy in Vancouver, BC, and graduated in 1991 after winning the triple jump event at the BC high school track and field provincial championships. She then went on to compete in track and field for the Kajaks Track & Field Club and the University of British Columbia Thunderbirds while earning a Bachelor of Science in Cell Biology. She placed ninth in the triple jump at the 1995 Canadian Track and Field Championships in Montreal. Later, as a collegiate cyclist, she attended Midwestern State University in Wichita Falls, Texas, obtaining a Master of Science degree in biology.

Hannos first raced her bike in 1996 and a year later was selected by Cycling Canada for the 1997 Tour Cycliste Féminin, the women's version of the Tour de France. She represented Canada at the 1998 XVI Commonwealth Games in Kuala Lumpur, Malaysia, and was the only Canadian cyclist to compete in four events—the road race, individual time trial, individual pursuit and points race. In the points race, she won the final sprint to finish in a three-way tie for fourth place but, after tie-breaking procedures, officially finished in sixth place.

Hannos has many career wins including gold in the criterium at the 2002 Canadian National Road Cycling Championships, one of ten career Canadian national championship medals. She notably finished third overall in general classification (GC) at the 2002 Redlands Bicycle Classic in California.

Coached by her father, Sandor (Alex) Hannos, an accomplished cyclist originally from Hungary, Hannos often trained and raced with her younger sister. In 1998, the sisters were recruited by Midwestern State University and offered athletic scholarships to race for the school cycling team. Over the next few years, the sisters won a total of nine US collegiate national championship (division I) events on the road and on the velodrome for Midwestern State University. Both sisters also raced for the American cycling team, Verizon Wireless, in 2001.

Hannos retired from professional cycling at the end of 2004 after racing three seasons for the UCI team Équipe Cycliste RONA from Québec. In 2011, she helped manage the Vancouver-based Trek Red Truck p/b Mosaic Homes Women's Cycling Team alongside mountain bike cross country Olympic silver medalist, Alison Sydor.

== Major results ==
1996

- 1st - Tour de White Rock (White Rock, BC)

1997

- 1st - Tour de White Rock (White Rock, BC)
- 3rd - Bastion Square Grand Prix Criterium (Victoria, BC)
- 4th - Canadian National Championship, Road, Road Race, Elite (Rouyn-Noranda, QC)
- 6th - Canadian National Championship, Road, ITT, Elite (Rouyn-Noranda, QC)
- 1st - Prologue; 5th - General Classification, Tour of Willamette (Eugene, OR)
- 15th - General Classification, GP Feminin International du Canada (Québec)

1998

- 3rd - Canadian National Championship, Road, ITT, Elite (Vancouver, BC)
- 2nd - Pursuit; 2nd - Points Race, Canadian National Track Cycling Championships (Victoria, BC)
- 4th - Prologue; 5th - Stages 2 & 4; 15th - General Classification, Tour de Bretagne Féminin (Brittany, France)
- 8th - Pursuit; 10th - Points Race, UCI Track Cycling World Cup (Victoria, BC)
- 9th - Pursuit; 12th - Points Race, UCI Track Cycling World Cup (Hyères, France)
- 6th - Points Race; 8th - Pursuit; 9th - ITT; 12th - Road Race, XVI Commonwealth Games (Kuala Lumpur, Malaysia)

1999

- 3rd - Canadian National Championship, Road, Criterium, Elite (Sherbrooke, QC)
- 2nd - Pursuit, Canadian National Track Cycling Championships (Calgary, AB)
- 1st - Team Time Trial, US Collegiate Road Cycling Championships (Greenville, SC)
- 1st - La Primavera Lago Vista Bike Race (Lago Vista, TX)
- 13th - Pursuit; 19th Points Race, UCI Track Cycling World Cup (Frisco, TX)
- 11th - Pursuit; 11th Points Race, UCI Track Cycling World Cup (Fiorenzuola d’Arda, Italy)
- 52nd - General Classification, Holland Ladies Tour (Netherlands)

2000

- 2nd - Canadian National Championship, Road, Criterium, Elite (Peterborough, ON)
- 2nd - Pursuit; 2nd - Points Race, Canadian National Track Cycling Championships (Bromont, QC)
- 1st - Road Race; 1st - Team Time Trial, US Collegiate Road Cycling Championships (Athens, OH)
- 1st - Individual Pursuit; 1st - 500m Time Trial; 1st - Italian Pursuit, USA Collegiate Track Cycling Championships (Frisco, TX)
- 1st - HotterN’ Hell Hundred Road Race (Wichita Falls, TX)

2001

- 2nd - Canadian National Championship, Road, Criterium, Elite (Dieppe, NB)
- 7th - Prologue; 6th - Stage 4; 13th - General Classification, Tour of Willamette (Eugene, OR)
- 6th - US Postal Service Clarendon Cup (Arlington, VA)
- 5th - Road Race, Nature Valley Grand Prix (Minneapolis, MN)
- 8th - Tour of Somerville (Somerville, NJ)
- 5th - General Classification, Fitchburg Longsjo Classic (Fitchburg, MA)
- 10th - Twilight Criterium (Athens, GA)
- 4th - Stage 1, Grand Prix Feminin International du Québec (Québec)
- 9th - BMC Software Lance Armstrong Criterium (Austin, TX)
- 9th - BMC Software Tour of Arlington (Arlington, MA)
- 4th - Overall, BMC Software Racing Series
- 37th - UCI Women’s Road World Cup, First Union Liberty (Philadelphia, PA)

2002

- 1st - Canadian National Championship, Road, Criterium, Elite (Oxford County, ON)
- 1st - Valley of the Sun Stage Race, Criterium (Phoenix, AZ)
- 1st - Quad Cities, Criterium (Davenport, IA)
- 2nd - Stage 3; 3rd - General Classification, Redlands Bicycle Classic (Redlands, CA)
- 3rd - Stage 2; 2nd - Stage 7, International Tour de Toona (Altoona, PA)
- 45th - General Classification, HP International Women's Challenge (Boise, ID)

2003

- 1st - Overall, BC Superweek (British Columbia, Canada)
- 3rd - Global Relay Gastown Grand Prix (Vancouver, BC)
- 5th - General Classification, Valley of the Sun Stage Race (Phoenix, AZ)
- 5th - General Classification, Joe Martin Stage Race (Fayetteville, AR)
- 12th - Wachovia Liberty Classic (Philadelphia, PA)
- 1st - Mercy Celebrity Classic Criterium (Fort Smith, AR)
- 50th - UCI Women’s Road World Cup, Grand-Prix de Plouay (Plouay, France)

2004

- 3rd - Stage 5; 4th - Stage 3; 9th - General Classification, Tour of the Gila (Silver City, NM)
- 1st - Stage 2; 5th - General Classification, Joe Martin Stage Race (Fayetteville, AR)
- 3rd - Stage 4; 2nd - Sprint Competition, Nature Valley Grand Prix (Minneapolis, MN)
- 1st - Twilight Circuit Race; 4th - Twilight Criterium (Athens, GA)
- 1st - Road Race; 1st - Criterium; 1st - General Classification, Mississippi Gran Prix (Natchez, MS)
- 1st - Texas State Criterium Championships (Fort Worth, TX)
- 12th - Wachovia Liberty Classic (Philadelphia, PA)
- 5th - Stage 4; 6th - General Classification, Fitchburg Longsjo Classic (Fitchburg, MA)
- 5th - Stage 2, International Tour de Toona (Altoona, PA)
- 1st - Stage 2; 2nd - Overall, International Cycling Classic - Superweek (Wisconsin)
- 1st - Stage 2; 1st - Stage 3; 2nd Overall, Gateway Cup (St. Louis, MO)
- 2nd - Stage 2; 3rd - Stage 3; 2nd - General Classification, Bermuda Grand Prix (Bermuda)
- 3rd - Sprint Competition; 9th - Overall Competition, Women’s Prestige Cycling Series
- 11th - Pursuit; 15th - Scratch Race; 19th - Points Race, UCI Track Cycling World Cup (Los Angeles, CA)
