= Paul Jennings (cyclist) =

British cyclist

Personal information
- Full name: Paul Douglas Jennings
- Born: 20 February 1973 (age 53) Redditch, Worcestershire, United Kingdom
- Height: 189 cm (6 ft 2 in)
- Weight: 90 kg (200 lb)

Cycling career
- Sport: Cycling
- Disciplines: Road, track

Major wins
- 1st, 100km TTT, National Championships 1993, 1st, 4km Team Pursuit, GB National Championships, 1993, 1st, 100km TTT, National Championships 1994, 1st, 4km Team Pursuit, GB National Championships, 1994, 1st, 4km Team Pursuit, GB National Championships, 1995,
Medal record
Representing England
Commonwealth Games
Silver medal – second place	Victoria 1994	100 km team time trial

Paul Douglas Jennings (born 20 February 1973) is a British racing cyclist who represented Great Britain at the 1992 Barcelona Olympics and won a silver medal at the 1994 Commonwealth Games and a number of national titles. He competed in track and road cycling.

== Early life ==
Jennings started cycling at the age of 14 in Preston England riding for Preston Wheelers then later Ribble Valley Cycling Club.

== Professional racing career ==
After finishing second in the 1990 National Junior Road Race Jennings attended the Junior Road World Championships in 1990. In 1991 Jennings won two national titles and was selected to compete for Great Britain at the Junior World Championships in the team pursuit, team time trial and individual pursuit events. In 1992, at the age of 19, Jennings was selected to the British Olympic Team and competed in the Team Pursuit Team that came 5th setting a new British record 1992 Olympic Games.

In 1993 he joined the Kodak Racing Team and trained with Chris Boardman for the world hour record and competed in the 100 km Team Time Trail and 50 km Points Race for Great Britain at the World Championships in Norway. Jennings won seven national championships during his senior racing career and medaled in both road and track disciplines.

In the 1994 Commonwealth Games he raced for the English road racing team and won a silver medal in the 100 km team time trial setting a new British record of 1hr 56m.

During his career Jennings won a total of nine National Championships and represented Great Britain on numerous occasions.

== Retirement ==
Jennings was injured in an automobile accident in 1996, causing him to retire from professional cycle racing.

He now lives in Nelson, New Zealand, with his family. He spent 10 years on the Nelson Mountain Bike Club committee, several as president, and served as a trustee on the Saxton Velodrome Trust and Nelson Tasman Cycle Trail Trust. He is an active mountain bike rider and competes in enduro and XC events.
