= Nataliya Kyshchuk =

Ukrainian cyclist

Natalya Kishchuk
Personal information
- Full name: Natalya Kishchuk
- Born: 27 May 1968 (age 58) Ukrainian SSR, Soviet Union

Cycling career
- Sport: Cycling
- Discipline: Road cycling
- Role: Rider

Nataliya Kyshchuk (original name: Наталія Кищук; Also written as: Natalya Kishchuk or Наталья Кищук; born 27 May 1968) is a road cyclist from Ukraine. She competed at 1992 Summer Olympics without representing a nation as part of the Unified Team in the women's road race. She represented Ukraine at the 1996 Summer Olympics in the women's road race.
