= Hanne Malmberg =

Danish cyclist

Personal information
- Born: 19 November 1964 (age 61) Upernavik, Greenland

Cycling career
- Sport: Cycling

Hanne Malmberg (born 19 November 1964) is a Danish former cyclist. She competed in the women's individual pursuit at the 1992 Summer Olympics.
