= Linda Brenneman =

American cyclist

Personal information
- Full name: Linda L. Brenneman
- Born: October 13, 1965 (age 61) Wheat Ridge, Colorado, U.S.

Cycling career
- Sport: Cycling
- Discipline: Road cycling
- Role: Rider

Linda L. Brenneman (born October 13, 1965, in Wheat Ridge, Colorado) is a road cyclist from the United States. She represented her nation at the 1996 Summer Olympics in the women's road race and women's time trial.
