= Deirdre Murphy (cyclist) =

American road cyclist who also raced for Ireland

Personal information
- Full name: Deirdre Russell Murphy-Bader
- Born: 14 January 1959 New York City, United States
- Died: 11 November 2014 (aged 55) Bronx, United States
- Height: 168 cm (5 ft 6 in)
- Weight: 58 kg (128 lb)

Cycling career
- Sport: Cycling
- Discipline: Road cycling
- Role: Rider

Deirdre Russell Murphy-Bader (14 January 1959 in New York City, United States – 11 November 2014) was a road cyclist who represented Ireland in international competitions, including the 2000 Olympic Games.

== Career ==
Murphy began competitive cycling when she was 32. In 1997, she was the Women's World Masters champion in the road race discipline, and was also a two-time U.S. National Masters Champion.

She competed for Ireland in the Sydney Olympics in 2000, cycling in the women's road race, and retired shortly afterwards at the age of 41. Murphy was the first Irish woman to qualify for the Olympic road race.

Later, Murphy founded and served as executive director of Star Track Cycling, the New York-based youth program, which teaches track cycling skills to kids from under-resourced communities at Kissena Velodrome in Queens.

== Personal life ==
Murphy was born in New York City, the child of Daniel Murphy and Sally Kandle, and went on to earn an undergraduate degree from Ithaca College. She married lawyer Lawrence Bader in 2002 and had one son, Ethan, before her death from cancer in 2014.
