= Maria Cagigas =

Spanish cyclist

Personal information
- Full name: Maria Mercedes Cagigas Amendo
- Born: 15 August 1979 (age 47) Colindres, Spain

Cycling career
- Sport: Cycling
- Discipline: Road cycling

Professional team
- 2005–2006: Bizkaia-Panda Software-Durango

Maria Mercedes Cagigas Amendo (born 15 August 1979) is a road cyclist from Spain. She represented her nation between 1997 and 2005 at the UCI Road World Championships. She also competed in the women's individual road race at the 2000 Summer Olympics.
