= Mark Rendell =

New Zealand cyclist (born 1969)

Personal information
- Born: 6 June 1969 (age 57) Auckland, New Zealand

Cycling career
- Sport: Cycling
- Discipline: Road
- Role: Rider
Medal record
Representing New Zealand
Men's road bicycle racing
Commonwealth Games
Gold medal – first place	1994 Victoria	Road race
Bronze medal – third place	1994 Victoria	Team time trial

Mark Rendell (born 6 June 1969) is a cyclist from New Zealand.

== Career ==
In 1993 during the third stage at the Milk race Rendall was in a breakaway which made it to the finish line where he was beaten by Matt Postle by a slim margin of two seconds. At the 1994 Commonwealth Games at Victoria he won a gold medal in the road race and a bronze medal in the team time trial. Until the 2022 Commonwealth Games Rendall was the last kiwi to earn a gold medal in road cycling at the games. As a former student of Rotorua Boys' High School after Rendall won his gold medal he was inducted into the Rotorua Boys' hall of fame.

== Major results ==
1994
1st Commonwealth Games road race
1st Stage 10 Colonial Classic
1995
3rd National Road Championships New Zealand
1996
10th Overall Tour de Langkawi
