= Dania Pérez =

Cuban cyclist

Personal information
- Full name: Dania Pérez Serrano
- Born: 24 July 1973 (age 53) Camagüey, Cuba
- Height: 167 cm (5 ft 6 in)
- Weight: 65 kg (143 lb)

Cycling career
- Sport: Cycling
- Disciplines: Road cycling, Track cycling
Medal record
Women's track cycling
Representing Cuba
Central American and Caribbean Games
Silver medal – second place	1998 Maracaibo	3000m Individual Pursuit
Silver medal – second place	1998 Maracaibo	Points race

Dania Pérez Serrano (Note: In this Spanish name, the first or paternal surname is Pérez and the second or maternal family name is Serrano.) (born 24 July 1973) is a track and road cyclist from Cuba. She represented her nation at the 1996 Summer Olympics on the road in the women's road race and on the track in the women's points race. At the 2000 Summer Olympics she competed in the women's road race.
