= Irving Aguilar =

Mexican cyclist (born 1970)

Personal information
- Full name: Irving Jaime Aguilar Robles
- Nationality: Mexico
- Born: 6 June 1970 (age 56)
- Height: 1.73 m (5 ft 8 in)
- Weight: 64 kg (141 lb)

Sport
- Sport: Cycling
Medal record
Men's cycling
Representing Mexico
Central American and Caribbean Games
Bronze medal – third place	1998 Maracaibo	Road Race

Irving Jaime Aguilar Robles (born 6 June 1970) is a Mexican cyclist. He competed in the 1996 Summer Olympics.
