= Alex Tait (cricketer) =

New Zealand cricketer (born 1972)

Personal information
- Full name: Alex Ross Tait
- Born: 13 June 1972 (age 54); Paparoa, New Zealand
- Batting: Right-handed
- Bowling: Right-arm medium

Career statistics
Competition	ODI
Matches	5
Runs scored	35
Batting average	11.66
100s/50s	0/0
Top score	13*
Balls bowled	120
Wickets	3
Bowling average	29.33
5 wickets in innings	0
10 wickets in match	0
Best bowling	2/37
Catches/stumpings	0/–
Medal record
Representing New Zealand
Men's Cricket
Commonwealth Games
Bronze medal – third place	1998 Kuala Lumpur	Team competition
- Source: ESPNcricinfo, 20 April 2007

Alex Ross Tait (born 13 June 1972) is a New Zealand cricketer. He played in five One Day Internationals for New Zealand in the late 1990s.

In 1996–97 Tait took 9/48 in the first innings and 16/130 in the match for the Northern Districts against Auckland at Seddon Park, Hamilton. His first innings haul was a record for Northern Districts and his match figures were the best in New Zealand first-class cricket.

Tait has also played for the Northland in the Hawke Cup competition.
