= Maxine Johnson =

English racing cyclist

Personal information
- Full name: Maxine Johnson
- Nickname: Maxine "Magic" Johnson
- Born: 1961 (age 64–65) England; United Kingdom

Cycling career
- Sport: Cycling
- Disciplines: Road & Track
- Role: Rider

Amateur teams
- 1985: Ratae Road club
- 1999: Kettering C.C.
- 2002: Interbike racing team
Medal record
Cycling
Representing England
Commonwealth Games
Bronze medal – third place	1994 Victoria	team time trial

Maxine Johnson (born 1961) is a female retired English racing cyclist.

== Cycling career ==
Johnson represented England in the road race and 3,000 metres individual pursuit, at the 1990 Commonwealth Games in Auckland, New Zealand. Four years later at the 1994 Commonwealth Games in Victoria, British Columbia, Canada she won a bronze medal in the team time trial and competed in the road race and track points race.

In 1998 she won the season long trophy British best all rounder

== Palmarès ==
1990
3rd British National Road Race Championships

1993
2nd British National Road Race Championships
20:38 10 Mile Time Trial Ladies Competition Record

1994
1st (United Kingdom) British National Road Race Championships
3rd Team time trial, Commonwealth Games

 2nd National Pursuit 

1st National 25
1st National Track 1k Track Champion

1995 Competition record holder for 15 miles 32:15 1996

1st (Europe) Points race world masters, 30-34 category

1997
Beryl Burton trophy winner
National Circuit Time Trial Champion

1998
1st National 25
British Best All Rounder

1999
2nd British National Circuit Race Championships
