= Julia Freeman (cyclist) =

Personal information
- Nationality: English
- Born: 7 November 1963 (age 62)

Sport
- Sport: Cycling
- Club: Easterly Road CC
Medal record
Cycling
Representing England
Commonwealth Games
Bronze medal – third place	1994 Victoria	team time trial

Julia Freeman (born 1963), is a female former cyclist who competed for England.

== Athletics career ==
Freeman represented England in the road race and won a bronze medal in the team time trial event, at the 1994 Commonwealth Games in Victoria, British Columbia, Canada.

She rides for the Easterly Road Cycling Club.
