= Lesley Tomlinson =

Canadian cyclist

Personal information
- Born: 26 December 1959 (age 66) Spondon, England

Cycling career
- Sport: Cycling

Lesley Tomlinson (born 26 December 1959) is a Canadian cyclist. She competed at the 1996 Summer Olympics and the 2000 Summer Olympics.
