= Westshore Velodrome =

Bicycle racing track

The Westshore Velodrome
- Interactive map of The Westshore Velodrome
- Location: 1767 Island Hwy, Victoria, British Columbia
- Coordinates: 48.443429°N 123.464457°W
- Owner: City of Colwood
- Field size: 333m oval

Construction
- Built: 1993-1994
- Opened: 1994
- Cost: $2 million CAD

Tenant
- Greater Victoria Velodrome Association

Website
- http://www.gvva.bc.ca/

The Westshore Velodrome is a 333m outdoor bicycle racing track located in Colwood, B.C., and one of only two velodromes in British Columbia. It is part of the Juan de Fuca Recreation Centre, and is operated by the Greater Victoria Velodrome Association. The GVVA was founded in 1991. The velodrome was commissioned for the 1994 Commonwealth Games, and constructed for approximately $2 million. The track was designed to be used by the public after the Games, which is why the banking in the corners is less than might be found on tracks primarily intended for competition.

Stuart Peter O'Grady set a Commonwealth Games record in the 10-mile scratch race with a time of 18:50.520

In 2005, the velodrome was the host for the American Velodrome Challenge and the BC Provincial Track Championships.

The velodrome had some financial troubles immediately following the games, and sat in disuse until re-opening in the 2000s. Prior to 2008, the track was operated by the Westshore Parks and Recreation Society. It was reopened on July 29, 2011. In 2008, the mayor of Colwood voted to close the velodrome for good. It had been used prior to this for training local athletes, such as Ryder Hesjedal, but the cost of repairs to the infield were prohibitive. The repairs to the infield were completed in April, 2015, and an artificial turf field was installed. Olympic and World Championship medalist Gillian Carleton cites the opening of the velodrome as key to the beginning of her cycle racing career.

The newly reopened track hosted the 2011 and 2012 BC Track Championships.

If needed, the track could be used during the competition at the 2022 Commonwealth Games.

== Major competitions hosted ==
Year	Date	Event	Level
2025	August 15-17	BC Provincial TrackChampionships	Regional
2022	August 19-21	BC Provincial Track Championships	Regional
2017	August 18–20	BC Provincial Track Championships	Regional
2017	June 16–17	Trackfest 1	Regional
2015	August 28–31	BC Provincial Track Championships	Regional
2015	June 20–21, August 28–31	Trackfest 1 & 2	Regional
2014	June 20–22, August 22–24	Trackfest 1 & 2	Regional
2013	June 29–30, August 3–4	Trackfest 1 & 2	Regional
2013		BC Provincial Track Championships	Regional
2012		Trackfest 1 & 2	Regional
2012		BC Provincial Track Championships	Regional
2011		BC Provincial Track Championships	Regional
2005		BC Provincial Track Championships	Regional
2004		Canadian Championships	National
2004		American Velodrome Challenge	Continental
1998		Canadian Championships	National
1998	May 29–31	UCI World Cup II	International
1996		Canadian Championships	National
1995		Canada Cup Finals	National
1994	August 18–28	Commonwealth Games	International

== See also ==
- List of cycling tracks and velodromes
