= Juanita Feldhahn =

Australian cyclist

Personal information
- Full name: Juanita Ruth Feldhahn
- Born: 7 June 1973 (age 53) Ipswich, Queensland, Australia
- Height: 174 cm (5 ft 9 in)
- Weight: 57 kg (126 lb)

Cycling career
- Sport: Cycling
- Discipline: Road cycling

Juanita Ruth Feldhahn (born 7 June 1973) is a road cyclist from Australia. She represented her nation at the 2000 Summer Olympics in the women's road race.
