= Karen Smith (New Zealand field hockey) =

New Zealand field hockey player

Personal information
- Born: 3 December 1970 (age 55)
Medal record
Women's field hockey
Representing New Zealand
Commonwealth Games
Bronze medal – third place	1998 Kuala Lumpur	Team

Karen Smith (born 3 December 1970) is a retired female field hockey player from New Zealand. She was a member of the Women's National Team, nicknamed The Black Sticks, that won the bronze medal at the 1998 Commonwealth Games in Kuala Lumpur, Malaysia.
