= National Collegiate Cycling Association =

Collegiate division of USA Cycling

The National Collegiate Cycling Association is a division of USA Cycling and the governing body of collegiate cycling in the US. Its predecessor was the US Collegiate Cycling Association (USCCA), which held the first national collegiate road cycling championships in San Luis Obispo, CA in May 1988. It was hosted by California Polytechnic State University.

NCCA member clubs must be recognized by its school, and each school campus can be represented by only one club.

Constituent conferences are:

- ACCC: Atlantic Collegiate Cycling Conference
- RMCCC: Rocky Mountain Collegiate Cycling Conference
- ECCC: Eastern Collegiate Cycling Conference
- SCCCC: South Central Collegiate Cycling Conference
- MWCCC: Midwestern Collegiate Cycling Conference
- SECCC: Southeastern Collegiate Cycling Conference
- NCCCC: North Central Collegiate Cycling Conference
- SWCCC: Southwestern Collegiate Cycling Conference
- NWCCC: Northwestern Collegiate Cycling Conference
- WCCC: Western Collegiate Cycling Conference

== See also ==
- USA Cycling
