= Maritza Corredor =

Colombian cyclist

Personal information
- Full name: Maritza Corredor Alvarez
- Born: 21 January 1969 (age 57) Colombia

Cycling career
- Sport: Cycling
- Discipline: Road cycling
- Role: Rider

Maritza Corredor Alvarez (born 21 January 1969) is a road cyclist from Colombia. She represented her nation at the 1996 Summer Olympics in the women's road race.

== Major results ==
1995
9th UCI Road World Championships – Women's time trial
