= Clare Greenwood =

Welsh racing cyclist

Personal information
- Full name: Clare Greenwood
- Born: 17 October 1958 (age 67) Cardiff, Wales

Cycling career
- Sport: Cycling
- Disciplines: Track & Road
- Role: Rider

Amateur team
- 1997: Cardiff Byways RCC

Professional teams
- 1996: Team CJ
- 1999–2003?: MI Racing
- 2005-: Bush Healthcare

Major wins
- World Champion x2

Clare Greenwood (born 17 October 1958) is a Welsh former professional cyclist from Cardiff, Wales. She represented Wales in the Commonwealth Games, competing in the pursuit and road race 1990, Points Race, Pursuit and Road Race in 1994 and the road race in 1998.

Greenwood competed in Tours in Germany, Italy, Spain, Norway, Japan, United States, Canada, eastern Europe and several Tours in France including the Grande Boucle Féminine between 1984 and 1989 – finishing 7th – and the Tour de EEC between 1989 and 1994. She has held every Welsh time trial record, and in 2002 held the records for 10 and 100 miles. Greenwood was world masters time trial champion in 2001, and road race champion in 2002.

== Palmarès ==
1996
1st BAR (Best All Rounder) Welsh Women's TT. Average 24.538mph
1997
1st BAR (Best All Rounder) Welsh Women's TT. Average 23.965mph
1999
1st BAR (Best All Rounder) Welsh Women's TT. Average 24.756mph
2000
1st BAR (Best All Rounder) Welsh Women's TT. Average 24.376mph
2001
1st Time Trial, World Masters Championships
2002
1st Road Race, World Masters Championships
2007
3rd Time Trial, World Masters Championships
4th Road Race, World Masters Championships
