= Donna Wynd =

New Zealand cyclist

Personal information
- Born: 22 October 1961 (age 64) Auckland, New Zealand

Sport
- Country: New Zealand
- Sport: Track cycling

Donna Wynd (born 22 October 1961 in Auckland) is a track cyclist from New Zealand, who competes in the women's sprint event.

At the 1994 Commonwealth Games at Victoria, B.C. she came third, winning a bronze medal.

At the 1996 Summer Olympics at Atlanta she came 12th.

== Life after sport ==
Wynd holds a master's degree in economic geography. Her career in research and policy spans NGOs, public and private sectors, education, and urban development.

She is co-chair of Bike Auckland, the non-profit working to make things better for people on bikes.
