= Scott Nelson =

New Zealand racewalker

Personal information
- Full name: Scott Anthony Murray Nelson
- Born: 10 October 1969 (age 56) Auckland, New Zealand
- Height: 186 cm (6 ft 1 in)
- Weight: 76 kg (168 lb)

Scott Anthony Murray Nelson (born 10 October 1969 in Auckland) is a New Zealand athlete specialising in race walking. He competed for New Zealand at the 1994 Commonwealth Games, winning a bronze in the 30 km road walk. At the 1996 Summer Olympics he came 32nd in the 20 km road walk, with a time of 1 hr 25m 50s.

He attended High School at Waitākere College.

== Achievements ==
Year	Competition	Venue	Position	Event	Notes
Representing New Zealand
1991	World Race Walking Cup	San Jose, United States	80th	20 km	1:33:10
1993	World Race Walking Cup	Monterrey, Mexico	71st	20 km	1:37:36
1993	World Championships	Stuttgart, Germany	27th	20 km	1:30:17
1994	Commonwealth Games	Victoria, British Columbia, Canada	3rd	30 km	2:09:10
1995	World Race Walking Cup	Beijing, PR China	—	20 km	DNF
1995	World Championships	Gothenburg, Sweden	31st	20 km	1:32:19
1996	Olympic Games	Atlanta, United States	32nd	20 km	1:25:50
1997	World Championships	Athens, Greece	—	20 km	DNF
