= Bianca Netzler (cyclist) =

New Zealand-Samoan cyclist

Personal information
- Full name: Bianca Jane Netzler
- Born: 14 July 1974 (age 52) New Zealand
- Height: 168 cm (5 ft 6 in)
- Weight: 58 kg (128 lb)

Cycling career
- Sport: Cycling
- Discipline: Road cycling
- Role: Rider

Bianca Jane Netzler (born 14 July 1974, in New Zealand) is a New Zealand road cyclist who represented Samoa.

She competed at the 2000 Summer Olympics in the women's road race. In 1998, she competed in the 1998 Commonwealth Games in Kuala Lumpur and won silver in the time trial at the world B-grade championships in South America. She also raced for New Zealand at the 1993 Junior World Championships. In 1998, she raced for two teams: APSTT Moselle Champion and Opstalan.
