= Darren Liddel =

New Zealand weightlifter (born 1971)

Medal record

Representing New Zealand

Men's Weightlifting

Commonwealth Games
Gold medal – first place	1998 Kuala Lumpur	105+ kg clean and jerk
Gold medal – first place	1998 Kuala Lumpur	105+ kg snatch
Gold medal – first place	1998 Kuala Lumpur	105+ kg total

Darren Liddel (born 6 May 1971) was an Olympic weightlifter for New Zealand.

At the 1998 Commonwealth Games in Kuala Lumpur he won three gold medals, one in each of the men's 105+ kg clean and jerk, snatch and combined total. He also competed at the 1994 Commonwealth Games in Victoria where he placed 5th in the men's 108+ kg.

Of his return to Te Atatū from Kuala Lumpur Liddel said: "Little did I know three weeks ago that I would be returning home to this kind of welcome. I’m speechless". The contest worsened a wrist injury, and within two years he had stopped weightlifting.
