= Athletics at the 1994 Commonwealth Games – Men's 30 kilometres walk =

Men's 30 kilometres walk at the Commonwealth Games

The men's 30 kilometres walk event at the 1994 Commonwealth Games was held in Victoria, British Columbia.

== Results ==
Rank	Name	Nationality	Time	Notes
1st place, gold medalist(s)	Nicholas A'Hern	Australia	2:07:53	
2nd place, silver medalist(s)	Tim Berrett	Canada	2:08:22	
3rd place, bronze medalist(s)	Scott Nelson	New Zealand	2:09:10	
4	Darrell Stone	England	2:11:30	
5	Martin St. Pierre	Canada	2:11:51	
6	Simon Baker	Australia	2:14:02	
7	Steve Partington	Isle of Man	2:14:15	
8	Craig Barrett	New Zealand	2:14:19	
9	Chris Britz	South Africa	2:14:28	
10	Justus Kavulanya	Kenya	2:14:37	
11	Stephen Akol	Kenya	2:14:37	
12	Chris Maddocks	England	2:18:14	
13	Mark Easton	England	2:20:10	
14	Stephen Taylor	Isle of Man	2:21:34	
	Martin Bell	Scotland	DNF	
