= Western Collegiate Cycling Conference =

The WCCC or Western Collegiate Cycling Conference is a collegiate cycling conference based in the western United States. The conference is composed of 29 schools from California, Northern Nevada, and Hawaii. Schools include current Road National Champions UC Davis as well as former champions Stanford and UC Berkeley. The schools in the conference compete in road cycling races in the spring and mountain bike racing in the fall. The conference is governed by the National Collegiate Cycling Association, a division of USA Cycling. The conference is split into two divisions.

== Division I ==
- California Polytechnic State University
- California State University, Fresno
- California State University, Fullerton
- California State University, Long Beach
- California State University, Sacramento
- San Diego State University
- San Francisco State University
- San Jose State University
- Stanford University
- University of California, Berkeley
- University of California, Davis
- University of California, Irvine
- University of California, Los Angeles
- University of California, San Diego
- University of California, Santa Barbara
- University of California, Santa Cruz
- University of Nevada, Reno
- University of Southern California

== Division II ==
- California Lutheran University
- California Maritime Academy
- Claremont Colleges
- California State University, Channel Islands
- California State University, Chico
- California State University, San Marcos
- Humboldt State University
- Santa Barbara City College
- Santa Clara University
- University of California, Hastings College of the Law
- University of Hawaiʻi at Mānoa
