= Sarah Phillips (cyclist) =

British cyclist (born 1967)

Personal information
- Born: 3 July 1967 (age 59) Stonehaven, Scotland
- Height: 168 cm (5 ft 6 in)
- Weight: 57 kg (126 lb)

Cycling career
- Sport: Cycling
- Discipline: Road cycling
- Role: Rider

Sarah Phillips (born 3 July 1967) is a Scottish cyclist who competed for the United Kingdom as a road cyclist in the 1996 Summer Olympics. She participated in the women's road race and women's time trial at the 1996 Olympics, finishing 19th in the road race and 21st in the time trial.
