= Catherine Marsal =

French racing cyclist

Personal information
- Full name: Catherine Marsal
- Born: 20 January 1971 (age 55) Metz, France
- Height: 1.68 m (5 ft 6 in)
- Weight: 53 kg (117 lb)

Cycling career
- Sport: Cycling
- Current team: Ciclotel
- Discipline: Road
- Role: Rider (retired); Directeur sportif

Professional teams
- 1994: SLV–Winora
- 1998: Mimosa
- 1999–2000: Edil Savino
- 2001: Intersport
- 2002: Saturn
- 2003: Team Rona Esker
- 2004: Nobili Rubinetterie–Guerciotti

Managerial teams
- 2005: Team SATS Cycling
- 2006: Nobili Rubinetterie–Menikini Cogeas
- 2010–2014: Maersk Fitness–Previa Sundhed
- 2015–2019: Danish Cycling
- 2019: Bigla Pro Cycling
- 2020–: Ciclotel

Major wins
- UCI Individual Road Race (1990); Giro d'Italia Femminile (1990)

Catherine Marsal (born 20 January 1971) is a French former racing cyclist. She has been World Champion four times, she's won the Giro D'Italia, held the World Hour Record and raced professionally around the world.

At the age of 17 she was selected for the French Olympic Team for the first time.

Since then, she represented her native country at four Summer Olympics: 1988, 1992, 1996, and 2000.

Marsal retired from cycling in 2005 when she was recruited by Team SATS Cycling to become sports director for the Danish team. The team became number one on the UCI ranking. In April 2015 Marsal was hired by the Danish Cycling Union to be the national coach of the Danish female cycling team.

Marsal currently works as a directeur sportif for UCI Women's Continental Team Ciclotel.

== Personal life ==
Marsal is married and lives in Copenhagen. She gave birth to a son in 2013.

== Major results ==
1987
1st Road Race, UCI Junior Road World Championships
2nd Individual pursuit, UCI Junior Track Cycling World Championships

1988
1st Individual pursuit, UCI Junior Track Cycling World Championships
1st Overall Tour de Bretagne
3rd Points race, National Track Championships
10th Olympic Games Time Trial

1989
1st Overall Tour de Bretagne
UCI Road World Championships

2nd Road Race
3rd Team Time Trial

2nd Individual pursuit, National Track Championships

1990
1st Road Race, UCI Road World Championships
1st Road Race, National Road Championships
1st Overall Giro d'Italia Femminile
1st Overall Tour de l'Aude Cycliste Féminin
1st Overall Tour of Norway

1st Stage 7

4th Tour de Okinawa

1991
1st Team Time Trial, UCI Road World Championships
2nd Overall Tour de l'Aude Cycliste Féminin

1992
2nd Team Time Trial, UCI Road World Championships
2nd Coppa delle Nazioni

1993
2nd Road Race, National Road Championships

1994
1st Overall Tour de l'Aude Cycliste Féminin

1st Stage 8

1st Calan Road Race
2nd Overall Tour de Bretagne
2nd Overall Tour du Finistère

1st Prologue, Stages 1 & 4

1995
Hour record 47.112 kilometres (29.274 mi)
1st Stage 8 Grande Boucle Féminine Internationale
2nd Road Race, UCI Road World Championships
National Road Championships

2nd Road Race
2nd Time Trial

National Track Championships

2nd Individual pursuit
2nd Points race

7th UCI Road World Championships – Women's time trial

1996
1st Road Race, National Road Championships
National Track Championships

3rd Individual pursuit
3rd Points race

2nd UCI Road World Championships – Women's time trial
3rd Overall Tour de l'Aude Cycliste Féminin
10th Road Race, UCI Road World Championships

1997
National Road Championships

1st Time Trial
3rd Road Race

National Track Championships

1st Individual pursuit
1st Points race

2nd Kampioenschap van Vlaanderen
3rd Road Race, UCI Road World Championships
6th UCI Road World Championships – Women's time trial

1998
2nd Trophée International de Saint-Amand-Mont-Rond
3rd Overall Tour de l'Aude Cycliste Féminin
3rd La Flèche Wallonne

1999
1st Points Race, National Track Championships
2nd Time Trial, National Road Championships
3rd Ronde van Drenthe

2000
2nd Road Race, National Road Championships
2nd Boucles Nontronnaises

2001
3rd Road Race, National Road Championships

2002
1st Stage 1 Vuelta Castilla y Leon
1st Stage 3 Tour de l'Aude Cycliste Féminin

2004
3rd GP des Nations
