= Rebecca Bailey =

New Zealand cyclist

Personal information
- Full name: Rebecca Jane Bailey
- Born: 3 September 1974 (age 52) Christchurch, New Zealand

Cycling career
- Sport: Cycling
- Discipline: Road cycling
- Role: Rider

Rebecca Jane Bailey (born 3 September 1974) is a road cyclist from New Zealand. She won the New Zealand National Road Race Championships in 1993 and 1994. In 1995 she placed 11th in the world championship road race and 12th in the world championship time trial.

She represented her nation at the 1996 Summer Olympics placing 33rd in the women's road race and 22nd in the women's time trial.
