= Maria Lawrence =

English cyclist

Personal information
- Full name: Maria Lawrence
- Born: 20 September 1970 (age 56) England; Great Britain

Cycling career
- Sport: Cycling
- Disciplines: Track & Road
- Role: Rider

Major wins
- (United Kingdom) National Champion x2
Medal record
Cycling
Representing England
Commonwealth Games
Bronze medal – third place	1994 Victoria	team time trial

Maria Lawrence (born 20 September 1970) is a retired female English racing cyclist.

== Cycling career ==
Lawrence represented Great Britain at the 1996 Summer Olympics in Atlanta, Georgia.

She represented England and won a bronze medal in the team time trial event, at the 1994 Commonwealth Games in Victoria, British Columbia, Canada. Four years later she represented England in the road race event, at the 1998 Commonwealth Games in Kuala Lumpur, Malaysia.

== Personal life ==
She is married to another cyclist, Dominic Sweeney.

== Palmarès ==
1994
3rd Time Trial, Commonwealth Games
1996
1st (United Kingdom) British National Road Race Championships
1997
1st (United Kingdom) British National Road Race Championships
