= Glen Thomson =

New Zealand cyclist (born 1973)

Personal information
- Born: 12 July 1973 (age 52)
Medal record
Men's Track cycling
Commonwealth Games
Gold medal – first place	1998 Kuala Lumpur	Points race
Bronze medal – third place	1994 Victoria	Team pursuit

Glen Thomson (born 12 July 1973 in Dunedin, New Zealand) is a New Zealand racing cyclist. He won a gold medal at the 1998 Commonwealth Games in the men's points race, previously at the 1994 Commonwealth Games in Victoria, British Columbia, Canada he won a bronze medal as part of the men's team pursuit riding alongside Brendon Cameron, Julian Dean and Lee Vertongen. In 2000 he began racing on the professional cycling circuit, winning the 176 km New Zealand National Road Championship. From 2005 to 2019 he ran the Cycle Surgery franchise in Invercargill, New Zealand, and in February 2019 joined Cycling Southland in Invercargill as development and events co-ordinator. In 2020 Thomson was accepted to the Academy Southland Performance Coach Programme.
