= Jacqui Nelson =

New Zealand cyclist

Personal information
- Born: 26 May 1965 (age 61) Hammersmith, London, England

Cycling career
- Sport: Cycling

Jacqueline Nelson (formerly Morgan; born 26 May 1965) is a cyclist from New Zealand.

== Career ==
At the 1992 Summer Olympics at Barcelona she came 10th in the 3000m pursuit. At the 1994 Commonwealth Games at Victoria, B.C. she came 2nd in the points race and 3rd in the 3000 m pursuit, winning silver and bronze medals.

In 1995 she won the New Zealand National Time Trial Championships.

At the 1996 Summer Olympics at Atlanta she came 8th in the points race and 20th in the time trial.
