= Matt Postle =

Welsh cyclist

Personal information
- Full name: Matthew Postle
- Born: 1970 (age 55–56) Newport, Wales

Cycling career
- Sport: Cycling
- Discipline: Road
- Role: Rider

Amateur teams
- Coldre RC
- 1997: Cwmcarn Paragon RC
- 2007: CC Abergavenny

Professional teams
- Dynatech
- 1995–1996: Team Energy-Duracell

Matthew Postle (born 1970) is a Welsh racing cyclist, from Newport, Wales. He won stage 3 of the Milk Race in 1993, he also held the King of the Mountains jersey in the Tour of Malaysia for 6 days in 1997. He represented Wales at the 1990, 1994 and the 1998 Commonwealth Games.

== Palmarès ==
1990
7th Team Time Trial, Commonwealth Games (NZL)
15th Road Race, Commonwealth Games (NZL)

1991
1st Bristol Grand Prix (ENG)
7th Stanco Exhibitions Three-Day (WAL)

1st Stage 2, Stanco Exhibitions Three-Day (WAL)

1993
1st Stage 3, Milk Race

1994
1st Manx Time Trial
2nd British National 100km Team Time Trial Championships (with Glenn Holmes, Rod Ellingworth & Darren Knight)
4th Team Time Trial, Commonwealth Games (CAN)
8th Road Race, Commonwealth Games (CAN)

1995
5th British National Road Race Championships
3rd Stage 2, Tour of Lancashire, Premier Calendar

1996
3rd Stage 2, Tour of Lancashire, Premier Calendar

1998
17th Time Trial, Commonwealth Games (MAY)
