= Kathy Watt =

Australian cyclist

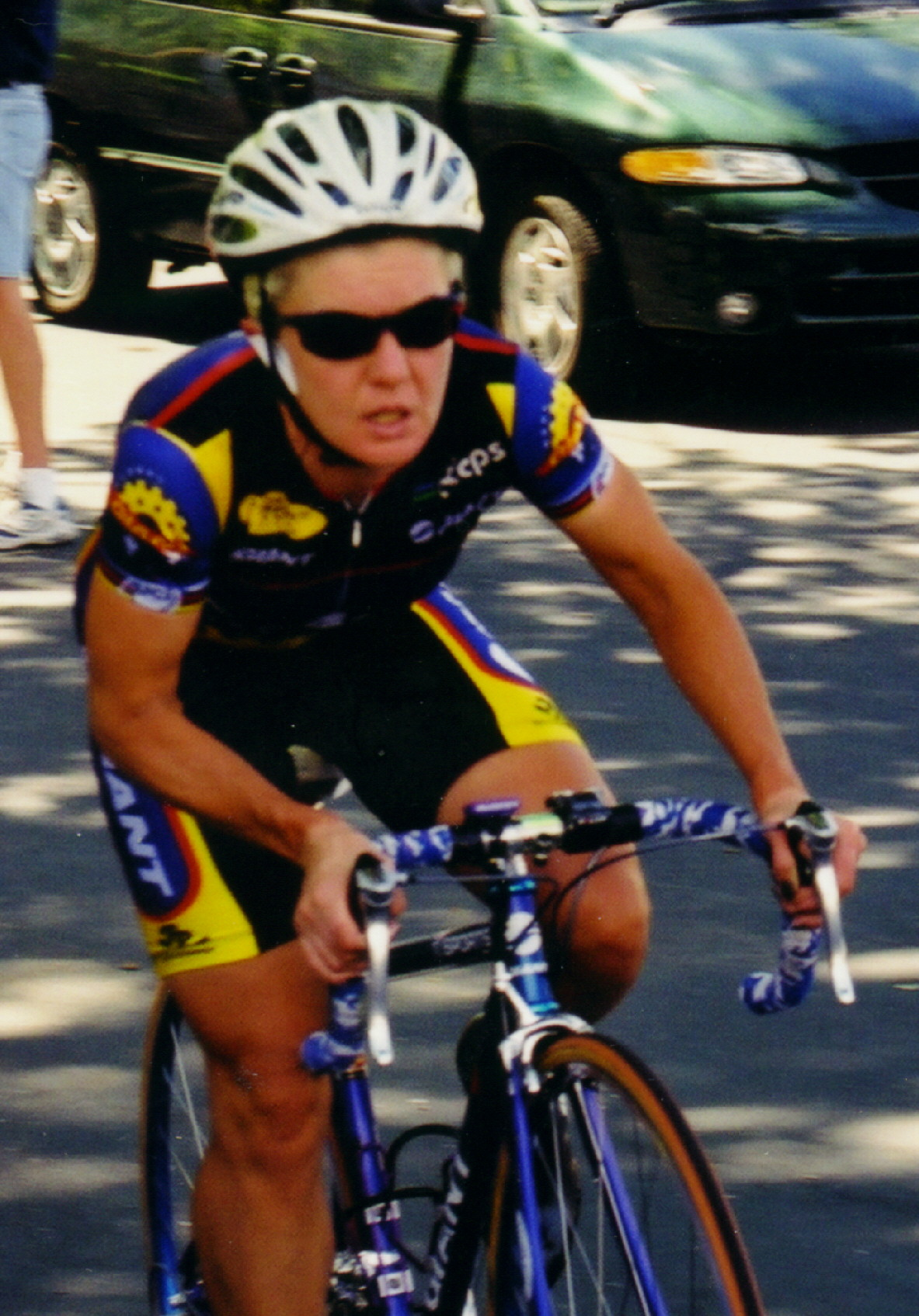
- Watt at the 1999 Women's Challenge

Personal information
- Full name: Kathryn Ann Watt
- Born: 11 September 1964 (age 62)

Cycling career
- Sport: Cycling
- Disciplines: Road and track
- Role: Rider
Medal record
Representing Australia
Women's road cycling
Olympic Games
Gold medal – first place	1992 Barcelona	Road Race
Silver medal – second place	1992 Barcelona	3000m Pursuit
Commonwealth Games
Gold medal – first place	1994 Victoria BC	Road race
Gold medal – first place	1994 Victoria BC	Team time trial
Bronze medal – third place	1998 Kuala Lumpur	Road race
Bronze medal – third place	1998 Kuala Lumpur	Individual time trial
Silver medal – second place	2006 Melbourne	Individual time trial
Commonwealth Games
Gold medal – first place	1990 Auckland	Road race
Women's track cycling
Commonwealth Games
Silver medal – second place	1990 Auckland	3000m Pursuit
Gold medal – first place	1994 Victoria BC	3000m Pursuit

Kathryn ("Kathy") Ann Watt (born 11 September 1964) is an Australian racing cyclist who won two medals at the 1992 Summer Olympics in Barcelona, Spain (gold in the road race, and silver in the pursuit). She has won 24 national championships in road racing, track racing, and mountain bike, four Commonwealth Games gold medals, and came third in the world time trial championship. She was made a life member of Blackburn Cycling Club in 1990. She was an Australian Institute of Sport scholarship holder.

The daughter of marathoner Geoff Watt, Kathy Watt turned first to running, winning the national junior 3 km championship. She began to train on a bike after achilles tendon problems. For a while, she competed in duathlon (running and cycling), but found she was a better cyclist than runner.

In 1996, Watt was in a legal dispute with the Australian Cycling Federation over who would race the pursuit in the Olympic Games. Watt had been told that she would be but was replaced a few days before the event by Lucy Tyler-Sharman. Watt appealed to the International Court of Arbitration for Sport, claiming a breach of contract. The court ordered Watt to be reinstated in the race.

In 2000, Watt again became involved in a controversy over a selection, but this time she was not successful in her appeal to the CAS.

She retired after 2000 but came back three years later but was not successful in an attempt to qualify for the 2004 Olympics. After another retirement, Watt worked as a coach and personal trainer. However, she made another comeback to qualify for the 2006 Commonwealth Games in Melbourne, where she won a silver medal in the time trial. In January 2006, she won the time trial section of the Australian open road championship in Buninyong, Ballarat.

Watt holds a Bachelor of Science degree from the University of Melbourne, with a major in physiology and pathology. She studied nutrition, anatomy, and physiotherapy. She attended Tintern Church of England Girls' Grammar, now Tintern Grammar.

== Awards and recognition ==
In 2015, Watt was an inaugural Cycling Australia Hall of Fame inductee. She was inducted onto the Victorian Honour Roll of Women in 2019.

== Major results ==
1990
Commonwealth Games

1st Road race
2nd Individual pursuit

3rd Overall Giro d'Italia Femminile

1 stage victory

1992
Olympic Games

1st Road race
2nd Individual pursuit

1st Road race, National Road Championships
1994
2nd Overall Giro d'Italia Femminile

1st Prologue, Stages 1 & 3b (ITT)

1st Giro del Piave
1st Overall Canberra Stage Race

5 stage victories

1995
3rd UCI Road World Championships – Women's time trial
1996
National Road Championships

1st Time trial
2nd Road race

1997
Oceania Championships

1st Time trial
2nd Road race

1998
1st Overall GP Presov and Pravda

1st Stage 1 (ITT)

2nd Overall Tour de Bretagne

1st Stage 1

2nd Overall Grazia Tour

1st Stage 4

2nd Grand Prix des Nations
6th UCI Road World Championships – Women's time trial
7th Overall Tour de l'Aude
1999
2nd Overall International Tour de Toona

1st Stage 5

7th Overall Grazia Tour
10th UCI Road World Championships – Women's time trial
2005
1st Chrono Champenois
1st Stage 2 Thuringen–Rundfahrt
2nd Overall GP International Feminin Bretagne
2006
1st Time trial, National Road Championships
2nd Time trial, Commonwealth Games
2007
1st Overall Tour de Perth
2nd Time trial, National Road Championships
2008
4th Time trial, National Road Championships
