= Tea Vikstedt-Nyman =

Finnish cyclist

Personal information
- Full name: Tea Riitta Vikstedt-Nyman
- Born: 6 July 1959 (age 67) Hyvinkää, Finland
- Height: 1.74 m (5 ft 8 1/2 in)
- Weight: 60 kg (130 lb)

Cycling career
- Sport: Cycling
- Current team: Retired

Major wins
- (Finland) National Road Race Champion (1990)

Tea Vikstedt-Nyman (born 6 July 1959) is a retired female racing cyclist from Finland. She represented her native country at three consecutive Summer Olympics, starting in 1988.

== Major results ==
1995
10th UCI Road World Championships – Women's time trial
