= Brendon Cameron =

New Zealand cyclist (born 1973)

Personal information
- Born: 12 February 1973 (age 53)
Medal record
Men's track cycling
Representing New Zealand
Commonwealth Games
Bronze medal – third place	1994 Victoria	Team pursuit
Bronze medal – third place	1998 Kuala Lumpur	Team pursuit

Brendon Cameron (born 12 February 1973) is a former New Zealand track cyclist. He won a bronze medal at the 1994 Commonwealth Games in the men's team pursuit, and followed it up four years later with another bronze medal in the same event at the 1998 Commonwealth Games. He then moved into coaching, most famously coaching partner Sarah Ulmer to a world record and gold medal in the individual pursuit event at the 2004 Athens Olympics. He was a finalist for coach of the year at the 2004 Halberg Awards.
