= Giro Donne records and statistics =

Cycling race statistics

The Giro Donne has been won five times by a racer who led the general classification on the first stage and held the lead all the way to finish. Catherine Marsal was the first to accomplish this achievement in the 1990 Giro, with Fabiana Luperini, Nicole Brändli, Annemiek van Vleuten and Elisa Longo Borghini doing the same in 1996, 2005, 2023 and 2024 respectively.

== Pink Jersey ==
=== Individual records ===
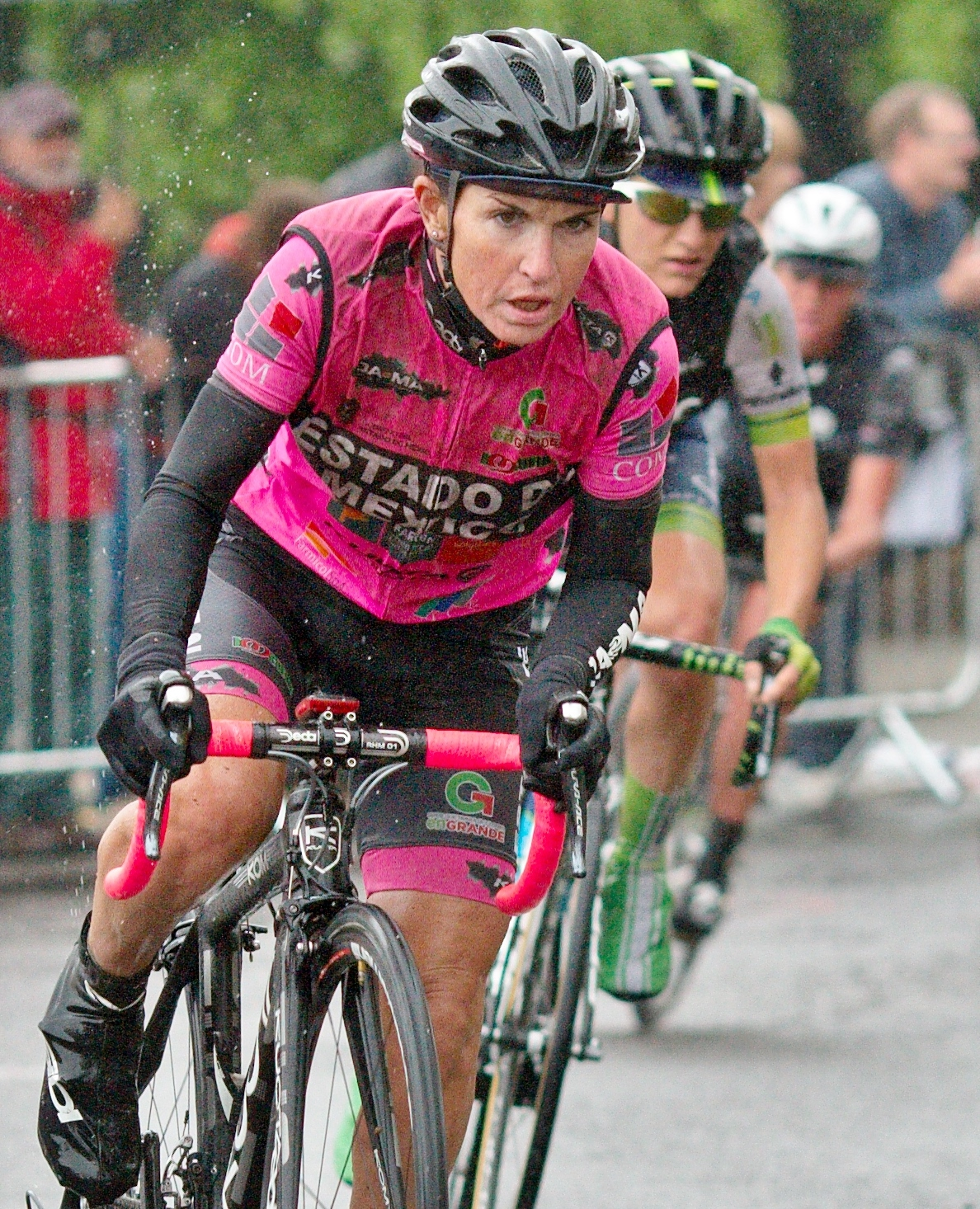
In addition to winning the general classification five times, Fabiana Luperini has ridden the most days wearing the pink jersey

The "Jerseys" column lists the number of days that the cyclist wore the pink jersey. The next five columns indicate the number of times the rider won the general classification, points classification, the Queen of the Mountains classification, and the young rider competition, and the years in which the pink jersey was worn, with bold years indicating an overall Giro win. For example: Fabiana Luperini has spent 40 days in the pink jersey, won the general classification five times, won the points classification once, won the mountains classification four times, and never won the young rider classification. She wore the pink jersey in the Giros of 1995, 1996, 1997, 1998, 2008 (which she all won). Roberta Bonanomi in 1989 and Demi Vollering in 2026 are the only two riders to have won the Giro Donne with only one pink jerseys in their career.

Diana Žiliūtė is, as of 2026 with fourteen days in pink, the rider with the most pink jerseys ever for someone who has not won the Giro. The four active Giro Donne winners Marianne Vos, Anna van der Breggen, Elisa Longo Borghini, Demi Vollering rank, as of 2026, joint 2nd, 4th, 10th and joint 42nd with thirty three, twenty seven, eleven and one day in pink respectively.

Key
Cyclists who are still active
Cyclists who won the Giro Donne

Rank	Name	Country	Pink jerseys	Giro wins	Points	Mountains	Young rider	Years
1	Fabiana Luperini	Italy	40	5	1	5	0	1995 (7), 1996 (13), 1997 (8), 1998 (7), 2008 (5)
=2	Annemiek van Vleuten	Netherlands	33	4	4	2	0	2014 (1), 2015 (1), 2018 (4), 2019 (6), 2020 (6), 2022 (7), 2023 (8)
=2	Marianne Vos	Netherlands	33	3	8	1	1	2010 (3), 2011 (9), 2012 (8), 2013 (4), 2014 (9)
4	Anna van der Breggen	Netherlands	27	4	1	0	0	2015 (2), 2017 (9), 2020 (2), 2021 (9), 2026 (5)
5	Nicole Brändli	Switzerland	25	3	1	0	0	2001 (8), 2003 (1), 2005 (10), 2006 (6)
6	Edita Pučinskaitė	Lithuania	19	2	0	2	0	2002 (2), 2003 (7), 2006 (1), 2007 (8), 2009 (1)
7	Joane Somarriba	Spain	17	2	0	0	0	1999 (8), 2000 (9)
8	Diana Žiliūtė	Lithuania	14	0	1	0	0	1997 (2), 2001 (4), 2004 (7), 2007 (1)
9	Petra Rossner	Germany	13	0	3	0	0	1988 (4), 1989 (8), 1995 (1)
=10	Elisa Longo Borghini	Italy	11	2	0	0	1	2020 (1), 2024 (8), 2025 (2)
=10	Megan Guarnier	United States	11	1	2	0	0	2015 (6), 2016 (5)
12	Svetlana Bubnenkova	Russia	9	1	2	3	0	2000 (2), 2002 (7)
=13	Mara Abbott	United States	8	2	0	2	0	2010 (3), 2013 (4), 2016 (1)
=13	Catherine Marsal	France	8	1	1	1	0	1990 (8)
=15	Ina-Yoko Teutenberg	Germany	7	0	1	0	0	2008 (3), 2010 (4)
=15	Kathy Watt	Australia	7	0	0	0	0	1994 (7)
17	Leontien van Moorsel	Netherlands	6	0	0	0	0	2000 (5), 2001 (1)
=18	Maria Canins	Italy	5	1	0	0	0	1988 (5)
=18	Elisa Balsamo	Italy	5	0	1	0	0	2022 (2), 2026 (3)
=20	Katarzyna Niewiadoma	Poland	4	0	0	0	1	2019 (4)
=20	Claudia Häusler	Germany	4	1	1	0	1	2009 (4)
=20	Evelyn Stevens	United States	4	0	0	0	0	2012 (1), 2016 (3)
=20	Marlen Reusser	Switzerland	4	0	0	0	0	2025 (4)
=24	Alessandra Cappellotto	Italy	3	0	0	0	0	1995 (3)
=24	Leah Kirchmann	Canada	3	0	0	0	0	2016 (1), 2018 (2)
=24	Lenka Ilavská	Slovakia	3	1	0	1	0	1993 (1), 1994 (2)
=24	Emma Pooley	United Kingdom	3	0	0	3	0	2009 (3)
=24	Olga Slyusareva	Russia	3	0	0	0	0	2006 (3)
=24	Zita Urbonaitė	Lithuania	3	0	0	0	0	1999 (3)
=24	Greta Zocca	Italy	3	0	0	0	0	1998 (2), 2001 (1)
=31	Lucinda Brand	Netherlands	2	0	0	1	0	2015 (1), 2018 (1)
=31	Imelda Chiappa	Italy	2	0	0	0	0	1997 (2)
=31	Nicole Cooke	United Kingdom	2	1	0	0	1	2004 (2)
=31	Michela Fanini	Italy	2	1	0	0	0	1994 (2)
=31	Sara Felloni	Italy	2	0	0	0	0	1998 (2)
=31	Linda Jackson	Canada	2	0	0	0	0	1998 (2)
=31	Jolanta Polikevičiūtė	Lithuania	2	0	0	2	0	2002 (2)
=31	Rasa Polikevičiūtė	Lithuania	2	0	0	0	0	2003 (2)
=31	Ruth Winder	United States	2	0	0	0	0	2018 (1), 2021 (1)
=31	Luzia Zberg	Switzerland	2	0	1	0	0	1993 (2)
=31	Anna Henderson	United Kingdom	2	0	0	0	0	2025 (2)
=42	Chantal Beltman	Netherlands	1	0	0	0	0	2002 (1)
=42	Roberta Bonanomi	Italy	1	1	0	1	0	1989 (1)
=42	Demi Vollering	Netherlands	1	1	0	1	0	2026 (1)
=42	Karol-Ann Canuel	Canada	1	0	0	0	0	2017 (1)
=42	Nada Cristofoli	Italy	1	0	0	0	0	1993 (1)
=42	Priska Doppmann	Switzerland	1	0	0	0	0	2004 (1)
=42	Shara Gillow	Australia	1	0	0	0	0	2011 (1)
=42	Mirjam Melchers	Netherlands	1	0	0	0	0	2008 (1)
=42	Amber Neben	United States	1	0	0	0	0	2009 (1)
=42	Gabriella Pregnolato	Italy	1	0	0	0	0	1999 (1)
=42	Bertine Spijkerman	Netherlands	1	0	0	0	0	2003 (1)
=42	Amanda Spratt	Australia	1	0	0	1	0	2018 (1)
=42	Ellen van Dijk	Netherlands	1	0	0	0	0	2018 (1)
=42	Daniela Veronesi	San Marino	1	0	0	0	0	1999 (1)
=42	Petra Walczewski	Switzerland	1	0	0	0	0	1993 (1)
=42	Paula Westher	Sweden	1	0	0	0	0	1989 (1)
=42	Kirsten Wild	Netherlands	1	0	0	0	0	2009 (1)
=42	Roza Yakupova	Russia	1	0	0	0	0	1993 (1)
=42	Kristen Faulkner	United States	1	0	0	1	0	2022 (1)

=== Number of wears per year ===
- Table up to 2026.

The largest number of different riders wearing the pink jersey in any year is 6. The smallest is 1.

Number of wearers	Years
1	1990, 1996, 2005, 2023, 2024
2	1988, 2007, 2011, 2012, 2013, 2014, 2017, 2019, 2021
3	1989, 1994, 1995, 1997, 2000, 2004, 2006, 2008, 2010, 2020, 2022, 2025, 2026
4	1998, 1999, 2001, 2002, 2003, 2015, 2016
5	1993, 2009
6	2018

=== Wearers by Country ===
- The following table is valid up to 2026.

The pink jersey has been awarded to 16 different countries since 1988.

Rank	Country	Pink jerseys	Giro wins	Points	Mountains	Young rider	Most recent cyclist	Most recent	Different holders
1	Netherlands	108	12	14	6	1	Demi Vollering	2026, stage 9	11
2	Italy	76	9	4	9	5	Elisa Balsamo	2026, stage 3	12
3	Lithuania	40	2	1	3	1	Edita Pučinskaitė	2009, stage 2	5
4	Switzerland	34	3	2	1	0	Marlen Reusser	2025, stage 6	5
5	United States	27	3	2	4	0	Kristen Faulkner	2022, stage 9	6
6	Germany	24	1	6	0	2	Ina-Yoko Teutenberg	2010, stage 4	3
7	Spain	17	2	0	0	0	Joane Somarriba	2000	1
8	Russia	13	1	2	3	0	Olga Slyusareva	2006, stage 5	3
9	Australia	10	0	0	2	1	Amanda Spratt	2018, stage 6	3
10	France	8	1	1	1	3	Catherine Marsal	1990	1
11	United Kingdom	7	1	0	3	2	Anna Henderson	2025, stage 3	3
12	Canada	6	0	0	0	1	Leah Kirchmann	2018, stage 4	3
13	Poland	4	0	0	0	0	Katarzyna Niewiadoma	2019, stage 4	1
14	Slovakia	3	0	0	1	0	Lenka Ilavská	1994	1
=15	San Marino	1	0	0	0	0	Daniela Veronesi	1999	1
=15	Sweden	1	0	0	0	0	Paula Westher	1989	1

=== Winning margin ===
Winning margin	Year		Winner		Runner-up
2'21"	1988	(Italy)	Maria Canins	(Australia)	Elizabeth Hepple
	1989	(Italy)	Roberta Bonanomi	(Soviet Union)	Aleksandra Koliaseva
	1990	(France)	Catherine Marsal	(Italy)	Maria Canins
	1993	(Slovakia)	Lenka Ilavská	(Switzerland)	Luzia Zberg
40"	1994	(Italy)	Michela Fanini	(Australia)	Kathy Watt
2'30"	1995	(Italy)	Fabiana Luperini	(Switzerland)	Luzia Zberg
3'03"	1996	(Italy)	Fabiana Luperini	(Italy)	Alessandra Cappellotto
4'46"	1997	(Italy)	Fabiana Luperini	(Canada)	Linda Jackson
2'22"	1998	(Italy)	Fabiana Luperini	(Canada)	Linda Jackson
3'23"	1999	(Spain)	Joane Somarriba	(Russia)	Svetlana Bubnenkova
1'19"	2000	(Spain)	Joane Somarriba	(Italy)	Alessandra Cappellotto
3'57"	2001 (Note: The 2001 race win was originally awarded to Belarusian Zinaida Stahurskaya, but she failed a doping control during the race and was stripped of the title nearly a year later. The 3 Stage victories (Stages 2a, 4 & 9) were reallocated to Rosalisa Lapomarda, Diana Žiliūtė & Nicole Brändli respectively.)	(Switzerland)	Nicole Brändli	(Lithuania)	Diana Žiliūtė
1'26"	2002	(Russia)	Svetlana Bubnenkova	(Belarus)	Zinaida Stahurskaya
17"	2003	(Switzerland)	Nicole Brändli	(Lithuania)	Edita Pučinskaitė
57"	2004	(United Kingdom)	Nicole Cooke	(Italy)	Fabiana Luperini
1'10"	2005	(Switzerland)	Nicole Brändli	(Spain)	Joane Somarriba|
11"	2006	(Lithuania)	Edita Pučinskaitė	(Switzerland)	Nicole Brändli
18"	2007	(Lithuania)	Edita Pučinskaitė	(Switzerland)	Nicole Brändli
2'37"	2008	(Italy)	Fabiana Luperini	(United States)	Amber Neben
30"	2009	(Germany)	Claudia Häusler	(United States)	Mara Abbott
2'05"	2010	(United States)	Mara Abbott	(Germany)	Judith Arndt
3'16"	2011	(Netherlands)	Marianne Vos	(United Kingdom)	Emma Pooley
3'27"	2012	(Netherlands)	Marianne Vos	(United Kingdom)	Emma Pooley
1'33"	2013	(United States)	Mara Abbott	(Italy)	Tatiana Guderzo
15"	2014	(Netherlands)	Marianne Vos	(France)	Pauline Ferrand-Prévot
1'30"	2015	(Netherlands)	Anna van der Breggen	(United States)	Mara Abbott
34"	2016	(United States)	Megan Guarnier	(United States)	Evelyn Stevens
1'03"	2017	(Netherlands)	Anna van der Breggen	(Italy)	Elisa Longo Borghini
4'12"	2018	(Netherlands)	Annemiek van Vleuten	(South Africa)	Ashleigh Moolman
3'45"	2019	(Netherlands)	Annemiek van Vleuten	(Netherlands)	Anna van der Breggen
1'14"	2020	(Netherlands)	Anna van der Breggen	(Poland)	Katarzyna Niewiadoma
1'43"	2021	(Netherlands)	Anna van der Breggen	(South Africa)	Ashleigh Moolman
1'52"	2022	(Netherlands)	Annemiek van Vleuten	(Italy)	Marta Cavalli
3'56"	2023	(Netherlands)	Annemiek van Vleuten	(France)	Juliette Labous
21"	2024	(Italy)	Elisa Longo Borghini	(Belgium)	Lotte Kopecky
18"	2025	(Italy)	Elisa Longo Borghini	(Switzerland)	Marlen Reusser
30"	2026	(Netherlands)	Demi Vollering	(Germany)	Antonia Niedermaier

== Stage Wins ==
=== Stage wins per rider ===
- This table is correct as of the 2026 Giro d'Italia Femminile.

19 riders have won 5 stages or more (including half-stages, excluding Team Time Trials). Riders with the same number of stage wins are ordered alphabetically using surname.

Key:

Cyclists who are still active

Rank	Name	Country	Wins
1	Marianne Vos	Netherlands	32
2	Petra Rossner	Germany	18
3	Annemiek van Vleuten	Netherlands	16
4	Fabiana Luperini	Italy	15
5	Ina-Yoko Teutenberg	Germany	13
6	Diana Žiliūtė	Lithuania	11
=7	Nicole Brändli	Switzerland	9
=7	Regina Schleicher	Germany	9
9	Giorgia Bronzini	Italy	8
=10	Mara Abbott	United States	7
=10	Greta Zocca	Italy	7
=12	Elisa Balsamo	Italy	6
=12	Svetlana Bubnenkova	Russia	6
=12	Imelda Chiappa	Italy	6
=12	Edita Pučinskaitė	Lithuania	6
=16	Olga Slyusareva	Russia	5
=16	Evelyn Stevens	United States	5
=16	Anna Van Der Breggen	Netherlands	5
=16	Lorena Wiebes	Netherlands	5

=== Order of first Victory ===
#		Name	Stage	Wins	Years	Notes
1st	(Germany)	Petra Rossner	1988, Stage 1	18	1988 (5), 1989 (4), 1990 (1), 1995 (6), 1999 (2)	
2nd	(Germany)	Jutta Niehaus	1988, Stage 4	1	1988 (1)	
3rd	(Italy)	Maria Canins	1988, Stage 5	2	1988 (1), 1990 (1)	
4th	(Australia)	Elizabeth Hepple	1988, Stage 8	1	1988 (1)	
5th	(Switzerland)	Barbara Ganz	1988, Stage 9	1	1988 (1)	
6th	(Sweden)	Paula Westher	1989, Prologue	1	1989 (1)	
7th	(Italy)	Imelda Chiappa	1989, Stage 3	6	1989 (1), 1994 (2), 1996 (3)	
8th	(Switzerland)	Luzia Zberg	1989, Stage 5	2	1989 (1), 1993 (1)	
9th	(Germany)	Angela Kindling	1989, Stage 7	1	1989 (1)	
10th	(Finland)	Tea Vikstedt-Nyman	1989, Stage 8	2	1989 (1), 1996 (1)	
11th	(France)	Catherine Marsal	1990, Stage 2	3	1990 (2), 1997 (1)	
12th	(France)	Cécile Odin	1990, Stage 3	1	1990 (1)	
13th	(Italy)	Francesca Galli	1990, Stage 5	1	1990 (1)	
14th	(Switzerland)	Evelyne Müller	1990, Stage 6	1	1990 (1)	
15th	(Australia)	Kathy Watt	1990, Stage 7	4	1990 (1), 1994 (3)	
16th	(Italy)	Elisabetta Fanton	1990, Stage 9	1	1990 (1)	
17th	(Switzerland)	Petra Walczewski	1993, Stage 1	1	1993 (1)	
18th	(Italy)	Nada Cristofoli	1993, Stage 2	2	1993 (2)	
19th	(Russia)	Roza Yakupova	1993, Stage 3	1	1993 (1)	
20th	(Italy)	Samantha Rizzi	1993, Stage 4	1	1993 (1)	
21st	(Italy)	Michela Fanini	1993, Stage 5	2	1993 (1), 1994 (1)	
22nd	(Slovakia)	Lenka Ilavská	1993, Stage 6	2	1993 (1), 1994 (1)	
23rd	(Austria)	Tanja Klein	1994, Stage 3	1	1994 (1)	
24th	(Germany)	Vera Hohlfeld	1994, Stage 6	1	1994 (1)	
25th	(Italy)	Alessandra Cappellotto	1995, Stage 2	4	1995 (1), 1996 (1), 2000 (2)	
26th	(Norway)	Monica Valvik	1995, Stage 3	1	1995 (1)	
27th	(Italy)	Fabiana Luperini	1995, Stage 5	15	1995 (2), 1996 (5), 1997 (3), 1998 (3), 2008 (2)	
28th	(Italy)	Katia Longhin	1995, Stage 9	2	1995 (1), 2003 (1)	
29th	(Lithuania)	Diana Žiliūtė	1996, Stage 8	11	1996 (1), 1997 (4), 1998 (1), 2000 (1), 2001 (2), 2004 (2)	
30th	(Germany)	Tanja Schmidt-Hennes	1996, Stage 9	2	1996 (2)	
31st	(Italy)	Valeria Cappellotto	1997, Stage 3	1	1997 (1)	
32nd	(France)	Sylvie Riedle	1997, Stage 8	1	1997 (1)	
33rd	(Italy)	Gabriella Pregnolato	1997, Stage 11	3	1997 (1), 1999 (2)	
34th	(Italy)	Greta Zocca	1998, Stage 1	7	1998 (3), 2001 (4)	
35th	(Australia)	Anna Wilson	1998, Stage 4	3	1998 (3)	
36th	(Canada)	Linda Jackson	1998, Stage 8	1	1998 (1)	
37th	(Italy)	Luisiana Pegoraro	1998, Stage 9	1	1998 (1)	
38th	(Finland)	Pia Sundstedt	1998, Stage 12	3	1998 (1), 1999 (1), 2000 (1)	
39th	(Belarus)	Zinaida Stahurskaya	1999, Stage 3	4	1999 (1), 2002 (2), 2003 (1)	
40th	(Russia)	Zulfiya Zabirova	1999, Stage 4	4	1999 (3), 2005 (1)	
41st	(San Marino)	Daniela Veronesi	1999, Stage 5	2	1999 (1), 2001 (1)	
42nd	(Russia)	Goulnara Ivanova	1999, Stage 8	1	1999 (1)	
43rd	(Spain)	Joane Somarriba	1999, Stage 10b	2	1999 (1), 2000 (1)	
44th	(Italy)	Sonia Rocca	1999, Stage 11	1	1999 (1)	
45th	(Netherlands)	Leontien van Moorsel	2000, Stage 1	4	2000 (3), 2001 (1)	
46th	(Italy)	Roberta Bonanomi	2000, Stage 5	1	2000 (1)	
47th	(Russia)	Svetlana Bubnenkova	2000, Stage 6a	6	2000 (2), 2002 (2), 2005 (1), 2007 (1)	
48th	(Lithuania)	Edita Pučinskaitė	2000, Stage 8	6	2000 (1), 2004 (1), 2006 (1), 2007 (2), 2009 (1)	
49th	(Russia)	Valentina Polkhanova	2000, Stage 10	1	2000 (1)	
50th	(Italy)	Sara Felloni	2000, Stage 11	1	2000 (1)	
51st	(Netherlands)	Debby Mansveld	2000, Stage 13	1	2000 (1)	
52nd	(Italy)	Rosalisa Lapomarda	2001, Stage 2a	1	2001 (1)	
53rd	(Australia)	Rochelle Gilmore	2001, Stage 2b	2	2001 (1), 2003 (1)	
54th	(Italy)	Simona Parente	2001, Stage 7	1	2001 (1)	
55th	(Switzerland)	Nicole Brändli	2001, Stage 10	9	2001 (3), 2003 (1), 2005 (3), 2006 (1), 2007 (1)	
55th	(Azerbaijan)	Elena Tchalykh	2001, Stage 12	1	2001 (1)	
56th	(Netherlands)	Chantal Beltman	2002, Prologue	1	2002 (1)	
57th	(Lithuania)	Jolanta Polikevičiūtė	2002, Stage 1	1	2002 (1)	
58th	(Netherlands)	Bertine Spijkerman	2002, Stage 4	2	2002 (1), 2003 (1)	
59th	(Germany)	Regina Schleicher	2002, Stage 5	9	2002 (1), 2003 (4), 2004 (1), 2005 (1), 2006 (2)	
60th	(Russia)	Olga Slyusareva	2002, Stage 7	5	2002 (1), 2004 (1), 2006 (3)	
61st	(Spain)	Fátima Blázquez	2002, Stage 9	1	2002 (1)	
62nd	(Lithuania)	Rasa Polikevičiūtė	2003, Stage 1	1	2003 (1)	
63rd	(Netherlands)	Loes Gunnewijk	2003, Stage 9	1	2003 (1)	
64th	(Australia)	Oenone Wood	2004, Stage 1	2	2004 (1), 2006 (1)	
65th	(Switzerland)	Annette Beutler	2004, Stage 4	1	2004 (1)	
66th	(United Kingdom)	Nicole Cooke	2004, Stage 8	2	2004 (1), 2011 (1)	
67th	(Germany)	Angela Brodtka	2004, Stage 9	1	2004 (1)	
68th	(Italy)	Giorgia Bronzini	2005, Stage 3	8	2005 (3), 2007 (1), 2013 (1), 2014 (1), 2016 (2)	
69th	(Netherlands)	Mirjam Melchers	2005, Stage 5	2	2006 (1), 2008 (1)	
70th	(Spain)	Marta Vilajosana	2006, Stage 5	1	2006 (1)	
71st	(Sweden)	Susanne Ljungskog	2006, Stage 7	1	2006 (1)	
72nd	(Netherlands)	Marianne Vos	2007, Stage 2	32	2007 (1), 2010 (2), 2011 (5), 2012 (5), 2013 (3), 2014 (4), 2018 (1), 2019 (4), 2020 (3), 2021 (2), 2022 (2)	
73rd	(Germany)	Ina-Yoko Teutenberg	2007, Stage 4	13	2007 (2), 2008 (4), 2009 (1), 2010 (4), 2011 (2)	
74th	(Germany)	Judith Arndt	2007, Stage 6	2	2007 (1), 2009 (1)	
75th	(Australia)	Vicki Whitelaw	2008, Stage 5	1	2008 (1)	
76th	(Germany)	Claudia Lichtenberg	2008, Stage 6	2	2008 (1), 2009 (1)	
77th	(Netherlands)	Kirsten Wild	2009, Prologue	4	2009 (2), 2013 (1), 2018 (1)	
78th	(United States)	Amber Neben	2009, Stage 2	1	2009 (1)	
79th	(United States)	Mara Abbott	2009, Stage 3	7	2009 (1), 2010 (2), 2013 (2), 2015 (1), 2016 (1)	
80th	(Italy)	Noemi Cantele	2009, Stage 5	1	2009 (1)	
81st	(Germany)	Trixi Worrack	2009, Stage 8	1	2009 (1)	
82nd	(United States)	Evelyn Stevens	2010, Stage 7	5	2010 (1), 2012 (1), 2016 (3)	
83rd	(United States)	Shelley Olds	2010, Stage 10	2	2010 (1), 2012 (1)	
84th	(Australia)	Shara Gillow	2011, Stage 2	1	2011 (1)	
85th	(United Kingdom)	Emma Pooley	2011, Stage 8	4	2011 (1), 2014 (3)	
86th	(Australia)	Tiffany Cromwell	2012, Stage 5	2	2012 (1), 2016 (1)	
87th	(Sweden)	Emma Johansson	2012, Stage 9	1	2012 (1)	
88th	(Netherlands)	Ellen Van Dijk	2013, Stage 8	1	2013 (1)	
89th	(Netherlands)	Annemiek van Vleuten	2014, Prologue	16	2014 (2), 2015 (1), 2017 (2), 2018 (3), 2019 (2), 2020 (1), 2022 (2), 2023 (3)	
90th	(Italy)	Barbara Guarischi	2015, Stage 1	1	2015 (1)	
91st	(United States)	Megan Guarnier	2015, Stage 2	2	2015 (1), 2017 (1)	
92nd	(Netherlands)	Lucinda Brand	2015, Stage 3	3	2015 (2), 2017 (1)	
93rd	(Italy)	Annalisa Cucinotta	2015, Stage 4	1	2015 (1)	
94th	(France)	Pauline Ferrand-Prévot	2015, Stage 5	1	2015 (1)	
95th	(Japan)	Mayuko Hagiwara	2015, Stage 6	1	2015 (1)	
96th	(Netherlands)	Anna Van Der Breggen	2015, Stage 8	5	2015 (1), 2019 (1), 2021 (2), 2026 (1)	
97th	(Canada)	Leah Kirchmann	2016, Prologue	1	2016 (1)	
98th	(Australia)	Chloe Hosking	2016, Stage 3	1	2016 (1)	
99th	(Netherlands)	Thalita de Jong	2016, Stage 9	1	2016 (1)	
100th	(Canada)	Karol-Ann Canuel	2017, Stage 1	1	2017 (1)	
101st	(United Kingdom)	Hannah Barnes	2017, Stage 3	1	2017 (1)	
102nd	(Belgium)	Jolien D'Hoore	2017, Stage 4	3	2017 (1), 2018 (2)	
103rd	(Finland)	Lotta Lepistö	2017, Stage 6	1	2017 (1)	
104th	(Spain)	Sheyla Gutiérrez	2017, Stage 7	1	2017 (1)	
105th	(Italy)	Marta Bastianelli	2017, Stage 9	1	2017 (1)	
106th	(United States)	Ruth Winder	2018, Stage 5	1	2018 (1)	
107th	(Australia)	Amanda Spratt	2018, Stage 6	1	2018 (1)	
108th	(Italy)	Letizia Borghesi	2019, Stage 4	1	2019 (1)	
109th	(United Kingdom)	Lizzy Banks	2019, Stage 8	2	2019 (1), 2020 (1)	
110th	(Belgium)	Lotte Kopecky	2020, Stage 7	2	2020 (1), 2024 (1)	
111th	(Italy)	Elisa Longo Borghini	2020, Stage 8	4	2020 (1), 2023 (1), 2024 (1), 2026 (1)	
112th	(France)	Évita Muzic	2020, Stage 9	1	2020 (1)	
113th	(Netherlands)	Lorena Wiebes	2021, Stage 5	5	2021 (2), 2023 (1), 2025 (2)	
114th	(Norway)	Emma Norsgaard	2021, Stage 6	1	2021 (1)	
115th	(South Africa)	Ashleigh Moolman	2021, Stage 9	1	2021 (1)	
116th	(United States)	Coryn Labecki	2021, Stage 10	1	2021 (1)	
117th	(United States)	Kristen Faulkner	2022, Stage Prologue	2	2022 (2)	
118th	(Italy)	Elisa Balsamo	2022, Stage 1	6	2022 (2), 2026 (4)	
119th	(France)	Juliette Berthet	2022, Stage 6	1	2022 (1)	
120th	(Italy)	Chiara Consonni	2022, Stage 9	3	2022 (1), 2023 (1), 2024 (1)	
121st	(Germany)	Antonia Niedermaier	2023, Stage 5	1	2023 (1)	
122nd	(Hungary)	Blanka Vas	2023, Stage 8	1	2023 (1)	
123rd	(New Zealand)	Niamh Fisher-Black	2024, Stage 3	1	2024 (1)	
124th	(Canada)	Clara Emond	2024, Stage 4	1	2024 (1)	
125th	(Germany)	Liane Lippert	2024, Stage 6	3	2024 (1), 2025 (2)	
126th	(Australia)	Neve Bradbury	2024, Stage 7	1	2024 (1)	
127th	(Mauritius)	Kimberley Le Court	2024, Stage 8	1	2024 (1)	
128th	(Switzerland)	Marlen Reusser	2025, Stage 1	1	2025 (1)	
129th	(United Kingdom)	Anna Henderson	2025, Stage 2	1	2025 (1)	
130th	(Australia)	Sarah Gigante	2025, Stage 4	2	2025 (2)	
131st	(Netherlands)	Demi Vollering	2026, Stage 5	2	2026 (2)	
132nd	(France)	Célia Gery	2026, Stage 7	1	2026 (1)	
#		Name	Stage	Wins	Years	Notes

=== Stage wins per country ===
Riders from 26 countries have won at least one stage in the Giro Donne.

Country	Total Wins	Different Winners
Italy	77	26
Netherlands	77	14
Germany	55	13
Australia	21	12
United States	19	7
Lithuania	19	4
Russia	18	6
Switzerland	16	7
United Kingdom	10	5
France	9	7
Finland	6	3
Spain	5	4
Belgium	5	2
Canada	4	4
Belarus	4	1
Sweden	3	3
Norway	2	2
San Marino	2	1
Slovakia	2	1
Austria	1	1
Azerbaijan	1	1
Japan	1	1
South Africa	1	1
Hungary	1	1
New Zealand	1	1
Mauritius	1	1
