= 2009 Giro d'Italia Femminile =

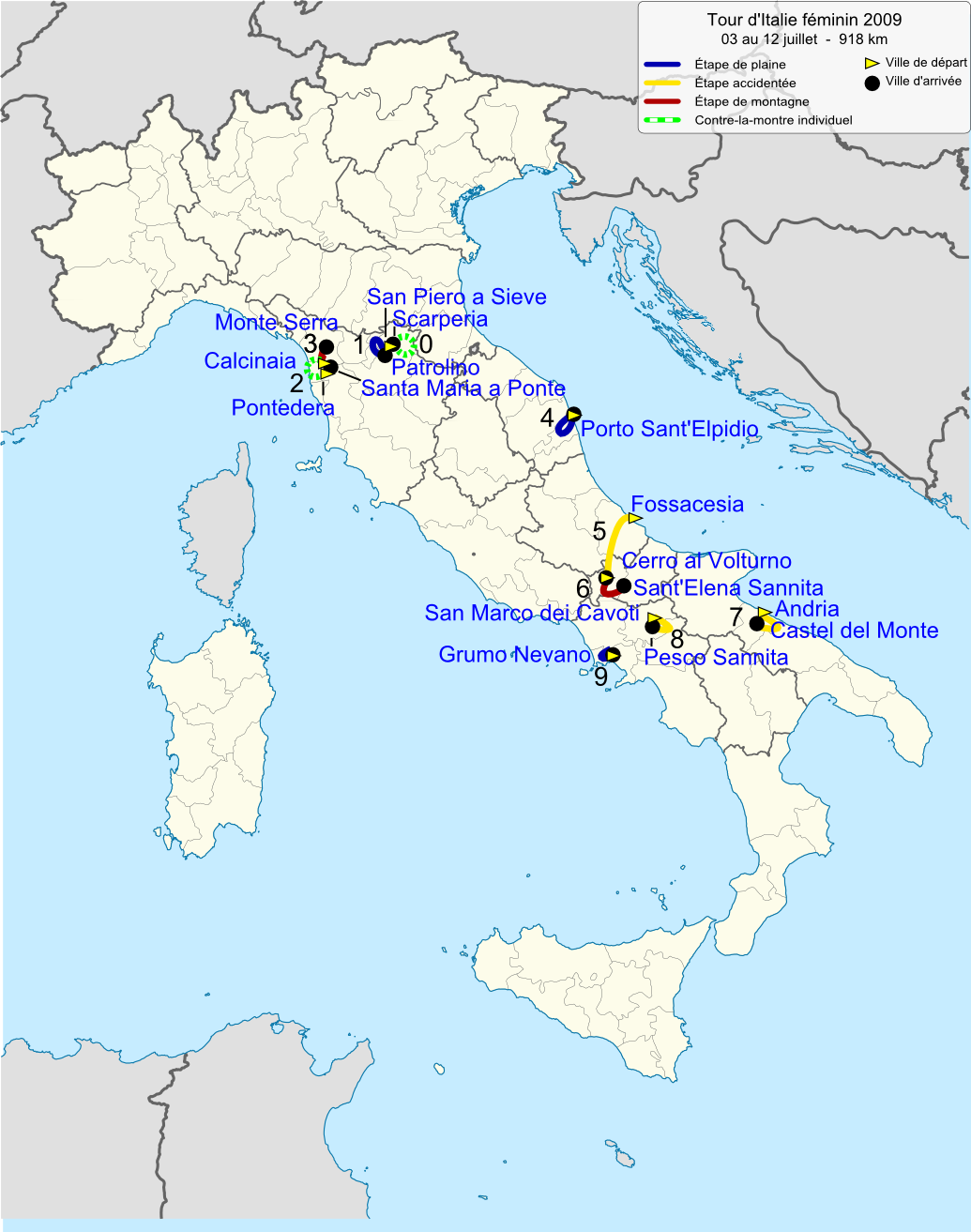

Race details
- Dates: 3–12 July 2009
- Stages: 9
- Distance: 918 km (570 mi)

Results
Jersey awarded to the overall winner	Winner	Claudia Häusler (GER)	(Cervélo TestTeam)
	Second	Mara Abbott (USA)	(Team Columbia–High Road Women)
	Third	Nicole Brändli (SWI)	(Bigla Cycling Team)
Jersey awarded to the points classification winner	Points	Claudia Häusler (GER)	(Cervélo TestTeam)
Jersey awarded to the mountains classification winner	Mountains	Mara Abbott (USA)	(Team Columbia–High Road Women)
Jersey awarded to the young rider classification winner	Young rider	Lizzie Armitstead (GBR)	(Lotto–Belisol Ladiesteam)
	Team	Cervélo TestTeam	

The 2009 Giro d'Italia Femminile, or Giro Donne, was the 20th Giro d'Italia Femminile, one of the premier events of the women's road cycling calendar. It was held over nine stages from 3–12 July 2009, starting in Scarperia and finishing in Grumo Nevano. It was won by Claudia Häusler of Garmin–Cervélo.

== Teams ==
Eighteen teams were invited to the Giro d'Italia Femminile. These teams were:

- Australia National Team
- Bigla Cycling Team
- Bizkaia–Durango–Champion System
- Cervélo TestTeam
- Equipe Nürnberger Versicherung
- Fenixs–Edilsavino
- Gauss RDZ Ormu–Colnago
- Lotto–Belisol Ladiesteam
- S.C. Michela Fanini Record Rox
- Safi–Pasta Zara–Titanedi
- Selle Italia–Ghezzi
- Team Cmax Dila
- Team Columbia–High Road Women
- Team Flexpoint
- Team System Data
- Top Girls Fassa Bortolo Raxy Line
- USA National Team
- USC Chirio Forno d'Asolo

== Route and stages ==
Stage results
Stage	Date	Course	Distance	Type	Winner
P	3 July	Scarperia	2.5 km (2 mi)	Individual time trial	Kirsten Wild (NED)
1	4 July	San Piero a Sieve to Pratolino di Vaglia	99.9 km (62 mi)	Medium-mountain stage	Edita Pučinskaitė (LTU)
2	5 July	Pontedera to Santa Maria a Monte	13.5 km (8 mi)	Individual time trial	Amber Neben (USA)
3	6 July	Calcinaia to Prato a Calci/Monte Serra	106.4 km (66 mi)	Stage with mountain(s)	Mara Abbott (USA)
4	7 July	Porto Sant'Elpidio to Porto Sant'Elpidio	109.2 km (68 mi)	Medium-mountain stage	Ina-Yoko Teutenberg (GER)
5	8 July	Fossacesia to Cerro al Volturno	109.2 km (68 mi)	Stage with mountain(s)	Noemi Cantele (ITA)
6	9 July	Cerro al Volturno to Sant'Elena Sannita	119.3 km (74 mi)	Stage with mountain(s)	Judith Arndt (GER)
7	10 July	Andria to Castel del Monte	131.2 km (82 mi)	Medium-mountain stage	Claudia Häusler (GER)
8	11 July	San Marco dei Cavoti to Pesco Sannita	115.6 km (72 mi)	Medium-mountain stage	Trixi Worrack (GER)
9	12 July	Grumo Nevano	111.2 km (69 mi)	Plain stage	Kirsten Wild (NED)

== Classification leadership ==
There were four different jerseys awarded in the 2009 Giro Donne. These followed the same format as those in the men's Giro d'Italia. The leader of the General classification received a pink jersey. This classification was calculated by adding the combined finishing times of the riders from each stage, and the overall winner of this classification is considered the winner of the Giro.

Secondly, the points classification awarded the maglia ciclamino, or mauve jersey. Points were awarded for placements at stage finishes as well as at selected intermediate sprint points on the route, and the jersey would be received by the rider with the most overall points to their name.

In addition to this, there was a mountains classification, which awarded a green jersey. Points were allocated for the first few riders over selected mountain passes on the route, with more difficult passes paying more points, and the jersey would be received by the rider with the most overall points to their name.

Finally, there was the jersey for the Best Young Rider, which was granted to the highest-placed rider on the General classification aged 23 or under. This rider would receive a white jersey.

Classification leadership by stage
Stage	Winner	General classification	Points classification	Mountains classification	Young rider classification
P	Kirsten Wild	Kirsten Wild	not awarded	not awarded	Trine Schmidt
1	Edita Pučinskaitė	Edita Pučinskaitė	Edita Pučinskaitė	Edita Pučinskaitė	Alyona Andruk
2	Amber Neben	Amber Neben	Amber Neben	Amber Neben	Lizzie Armitstead
3	Mara Abbott	Emma Pooley	Emma Pooley	Mara Abbott	Lizzie Armitstead
4	Ina-Yoko Teutenberg	Emma Pooley	Emma Pooley	Mara Abbott	Lizzie Armitstead
5	Noemi Cantele	Emma Pooley	Judith Arndt	Mara Abbott	Lizzie Armitstead
6	Judith Arndt	Claudia Häusler	Judith Arndt	Mara Abbott	Lizzie Armitstead
7	Claudia Häusler	Claudia Häusler	Judith Arndt	Mara Abbott	Lizzie Armitstead
8	Trixi Worrack	Claudia Häusler	Claudia Häusler	Mara Abbott	Lizzie Armitstead
9	Kirsten Wild	Claudia Häusler	Claudia Häusler	Mara Abbott	Lizzie Armitstead
Final		Claudia Häusler	Claudia Häusler	Mara Abbott	Lizzie Armitstead

== Classification standings ==
Legend
Pink jersey	Denotes the leader of the General classification	Green jersey	Denotes the leader of the Mountains classification
Mauve jersey	Denotes the leader of the Points classification	White jersey	Denotes the leader of the Young rider classification

=== General classification ===
Rank	Rider	Team	Time
1	Claudia Häusler (GER)	Cervélo TestTeam	25h 21' 32"
2	Mara Abbott (USA)	Team Columbia–High Road Women	+ 30"
3	Nicole Brändli (SUI)	Bigla Cycling Team	+ 2' 33"
4	Emma Pooley (GBR)	Cervélo TestTeam	+ 6' 35"
5	Svetlana Bubnenkova (RUS)	Fenixs-Edilsavino	+ 6' 51"
6	Fabiana Luperini (ITA)	Selle Italia–Ghezzi	+ 8' 53"
7	Tatiana Guderzo (ITA)	S.C. Michela Fanini Record Rox	+ 10' 54"
8	Carla Ryan (AUS)	Cervélo TestTeam	+ 12' 29"
9	Susanne Ljungskog (SWE)	Team Flexpoint	+ 14' 13"
10	Edita Pučinskaitė (LTU)	Gauss RDZ Ormu-Colnago	+ 14' 23"

=== Points classification ===
Rank	Rider	Team	Points
1	Claudia Häusler (GER)	Cervélo TestTeam	49
2	Mara Abbott (USA)	Team Columbia–High Road Women	41
3	Svetlana Bubnenkova (RUS)	Fenixs-Edilsavino	39
4	Giorgia Bronzini (ITA)	Safi–Pasta Zara–Titanedi	32
5	Nicole Brändli (SUI)	Bigla Cycling Team	29
6	Emma Pooley (GBR)	Cervélo TestTeam	29
7	Kirsten Wild (NED)	Cervélo TestTeam	27
8	Ina-Yoko Teutenberg (GER)	Team Columbia–High Road Women	25
9	Edita Pučinskaitė (LTU)	Gauss RDZ Ormu-Colnago	22
10	Trixi Worrack (GER)	Equipe Nürnberger Versicherung	21

=== Mountains classification ===
Rank	Rider	Team	Points
1	Mara Abbott (USA)	Team Columbia–High Road Women	38
2	Nicole Brändli (SUI)	Bigla Cycling Team	36
3	Claudia Häusler (GER)	Cervélo TestTeam	27
4	Trixi Worrack (GER)	Equipe Nürnberger Versicherung	25
5	Emma Pooley (GBR)	Cervélo TestTeam	19
6	Tatiana Antoshina (RUS)	Gauss RDZ Ormu-Colnago	13
7	Giorgia Bronzini (ITA)	Safi–Pasta Zara–Titanedi	10
8	Susanne Ljungskog (SWE)	Team Flexpoint	10
9	Fabiana Luperini (ITA)	Selle Italia–Ghezzi	10
10	Kristin Armstrong (USA)	Cervélo TestTeam	9

=== Young rider classification ===
Rank	Rider	Team	Time
1	Lizzie Armitstead (GBR)	Lotto–Belisol Ladiesteam	25h 48' 32"
2	Elena Berlato (ITA)	Safi–Pasta Zara–Titanedi	+ 30"
3	Tiffany Cromwell (AUS)	Australia National Team	+ 5' 18"
4	Valentina Carretta (ITA)	Top Girls Fassa Bortolo Raxy Line	+ 7' 06"
5	Olena Oliynyk (UKR)	USC Chirio Forno d'Asolo	+ 8' 53"
6	Shara Gillow (AUS)	Australia National Team	+ 14' 25"
7	Lieselot Decroix (BEL)	Cervélo TestTeam	+ 29' 47"
8	Alice Donadoni (ITA)	Gauss RDZ Ormu-Colnago	+ 32' 19"
9	Carlee Taylor (AUS)	Australia National Team	+ 34' 55"
10	Alyona Andruk (UKR)	Safi–Pasta Zara–Titanedi	+ 44' 28"

=== Team classification ===
Rank	Team	Points
1	Cervélo TestTeam	76h 16' 07"
2	Team Columbia–High Road Women	+ 9' 12"
3	S.C. Michela Fanini Record Rox	+ 50' 55"
4	Selle Italia–Ghezzi	+ 1h 05' 47"
5	Team Flexpoint	+ 1h 07' 25"
6	Gauss RDZ Ormu-Colnago	+ 1h 07' 31"
7	Bigla Cycling Team	+ 1h 08' 22"
8	Safi–Pasta Zara–Titanedi	+ 1h 30' 57"
9	Australia National Team	+ 1h 33' 01"
10	Fenixs-Edilsavino	+ 1h 59' 54"
