= Valentina Carretta =

Italian cyclist

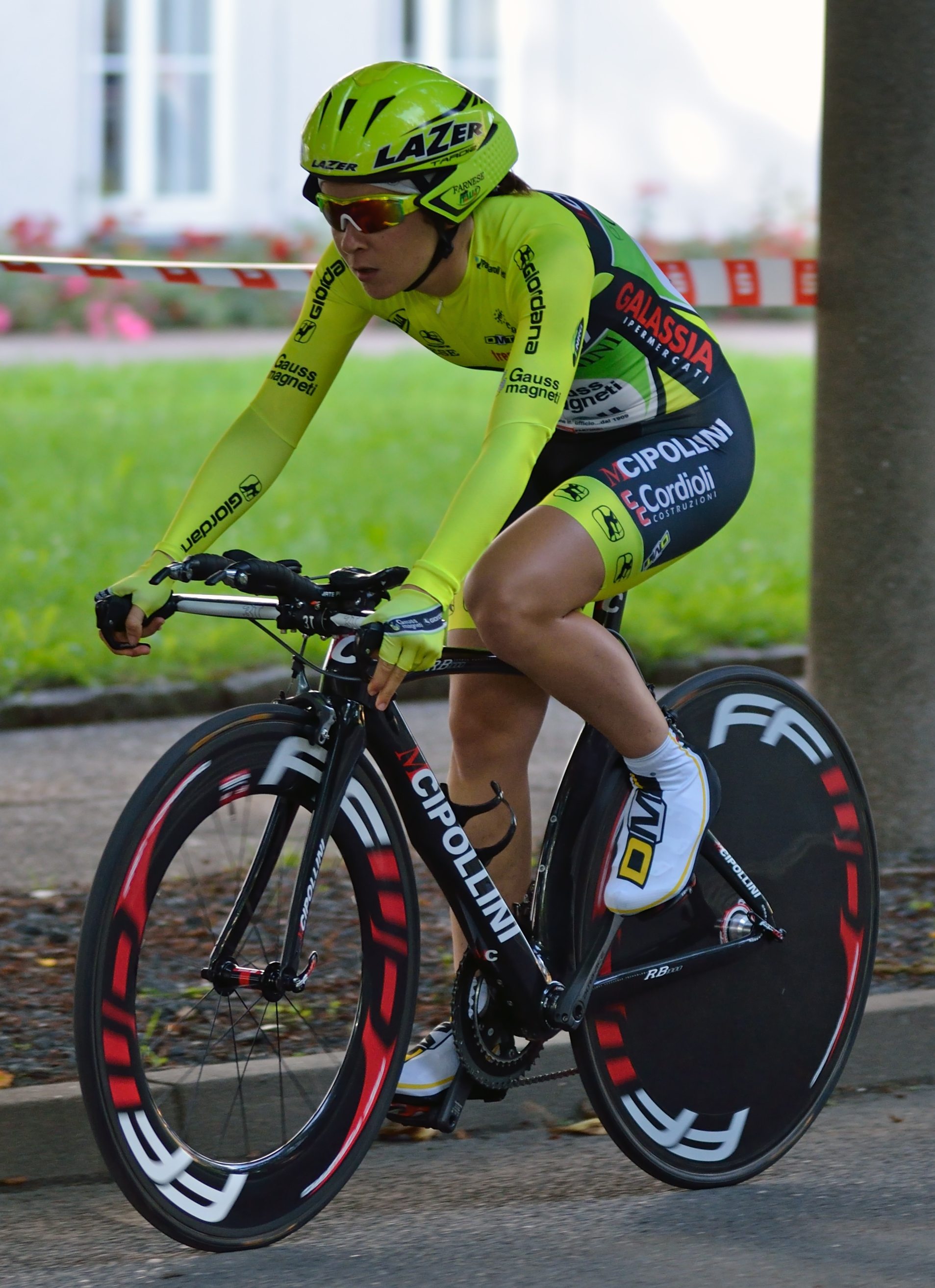
- Carretta riding in the 2012 Thüringen Rundfahrt der Frauen

Personal information
- Born: 16 September 1989 (age 37) Varese, Italy

Cycling career
- Sport: Cycling
- Role: Rider

Professional teams
- 2008-2009: Top Girls Fassa Bortolo - Raxy Line
- 2010: Top Girls Fassa Bortolo - Ghezzi
- 2011: Top Girls Fassa Bortolo
- 2012: MCipollini - Giambenini
- 2013: MCipollini - Giordana
- 2014: Alé Cipollini

Valentina Carretta (born 16 September 1989) is Italian retired racing cyclist.

== Career ==
After a promising youth career where she won eight provincial titles, and two regional titles, Carretta became a professional cyclist in 2008, racing with Top Girls Fassa Bortolo - Raxy Line, with her first entry in the Giro d'Italia Women in 2009 resulting in 23rd place in the overall classification and 4th in the young rider classification. She was a reserve for the 2009 UCI Road World Championships, before competing in the 2010 UCI Road World Championships.

In 2012 she joined MCipollini - Giambenini. She competed in the 2013 UCI women's team time trial in Florence, taking 5th place and won the final stage of the 2013 Energiewacht Tour.

She abruptly retired from competitive cycling in the middle of the 2014 season, as she was preparing to race in the Italian championship in her hometown, citing misbehaviours of those close to her, leading to a lack of trust and respect incompatible with being part of a team.

== Major Results ==
Grand Tour	2009	2010	2011	2012	2013
Giro d'Italia Women	23	25	26	24	30

Event		2010	2011	2012	2013
World Championships	Time trial	—	—	—	—
World Championships	Road race	67	—	—	—
World Championships	Team time trial	Race did not exist		—	5

== See also ==
- 2014 Alé Cipollini season
