= 2010 Giro d'Italia Femminile =

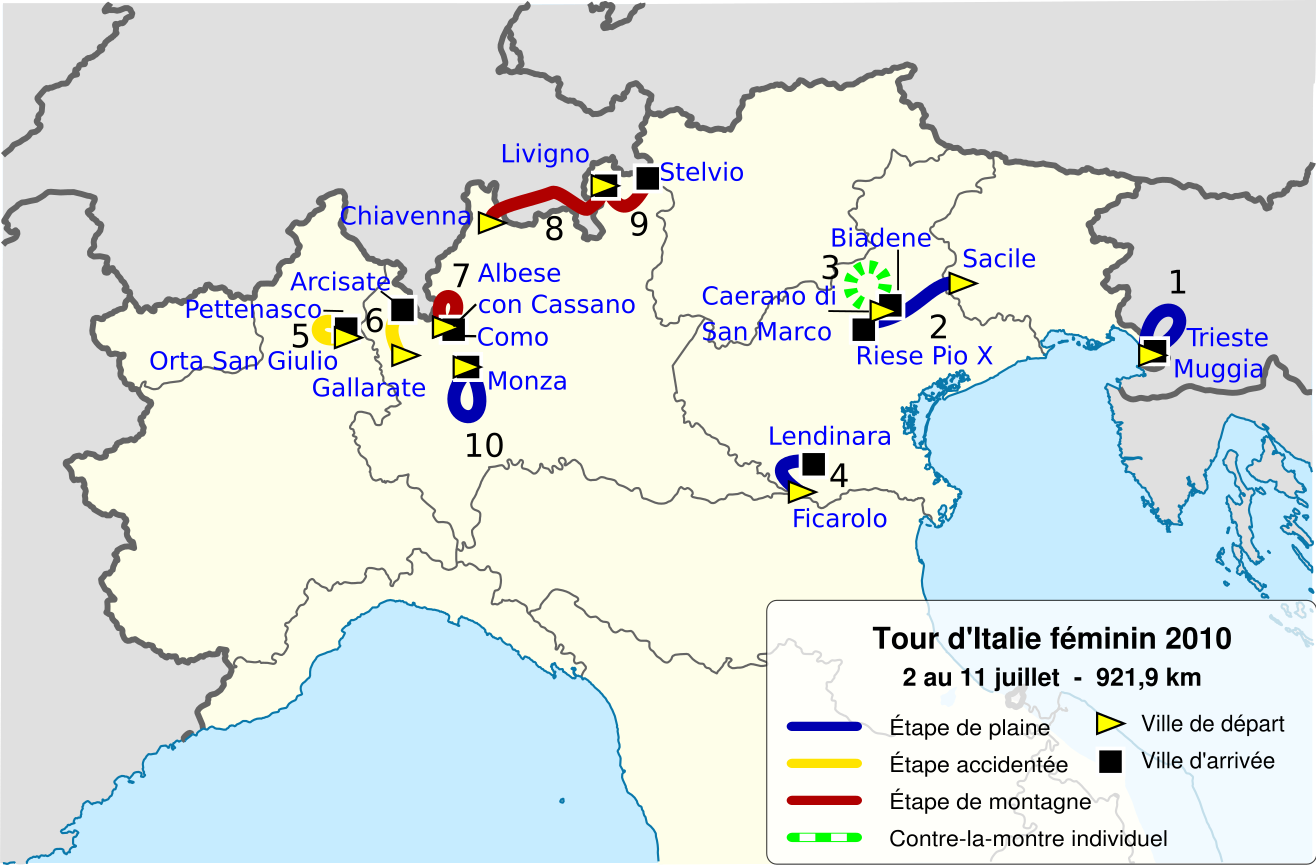

Race details
- Dates: 2–11 July 2010
- Stages: 10
- Distance: 921.9 km (572.8 mi)

Results
Jersey awarded to the overall winner	Winner	Mara Abbott (USA)	(USA National Team)
	Second	Judith Arndt (GER)	(Team HTC–Columbia Women)
	Third	Tatiana Guderzo (ITA)	(Team Valdarno)
Jersey awarded to the points classification winner	Points	Marianne Vos (NED)	(Netherlands National Team)
Jersey awarded to the mountains classification winner	Mountains	Emma Pooley (GBR)	(Cervélo TestTeam)
Jersey awarded to the youth classification winner	Youth	Marianne Vos (NED)	(Netherlands National Team)
	Team	Team HTC–Columbia Women	

The 2010 Giro d'Italia Femminile or 2010 Giro Donne was the 21st running of the Giro d'Italia Femminile, one of the premier events of the women's road cycling calendar. It was held over ten stages from 2–11 July 2010, starting in Muggia and finishing in Monza. It was won by Mara Abbott of USA National Team, the first American ever to win the Giro Donne.

== Teams ==
Sixteen teams with 8 riders each were invited to the Giro d'Italia Femminile, for a total of 128 starting positions. However, several teams started short by a rider or two, so the start of the race only featured 120 riders.

The invited teams were:

- Australia National Team (7 riders)
- Bizkaia–Durango (6 riders)
- Cervélo TestTeam
- Chirio–Forno d'Asolo
- Debabarrena–Kirolgi (6 riders)
- Fenixs–Petrogradets (6 riders)
- Gauss–RDZ–Ormu
- Lotto Ladies Team (7 riders)
- Michela Fanini–Record–Rox
- Safi–Pasta Zara
- Netherlands National Team
- Team HTC–Columbia Women
- Team Valdarno
- Top Girls Fassa Bortolo-Ghezzi
- USA National Team
- Vaiano-Tepso-Solaristech

== Route and stages ==
Stage results
Stage	Date	Course	Distance	Type		Winner
1	2 July	Muggia to Trieste	59 km (37 mi)		Plain stage	Ina-Yoko Teutenberg (GER)
2	3 July	Sacile to Riese Pio X	130 km (81 mi)		Medium-mountain stage	Ina-Yoko Teutenberg (GER)
3	4 July	Caerano di San Marco to Biadene	16.9 km (11 mi)	Flat stage	Individual time trial	Ina-Yoko Teutenberg (GER)
4	5 July	Ficarolo to Lendinara	90 km (56 mi)		Plain stage	Ina-Yoko Teutenberg (GER)
5	6 July	Fossacesia to Cerro al Volturno	109.2 km (68 mi)		Medium-mountain stage	Marianne Vos (NED)
6	7 July	Gallarate to Arcisate	116 km (72 mi)		Plain stage	Marianne Vos (NED)
7	8 July	Como to Albese con Cassano	110.8 km (69 mi)		Stage with mountain(s)	Evelyn Stevens (USA)
8	9 July	Chiavenna to Livigno	89 km (55 mi)		Stage with mountain(s)	Mara Abbott (USA)
9	10 July	Livigno to Stelvio Pass	68.5 km (43 mi)		Stage with mountain(s)	Mara Abbott (USA)
10	11 July	Autodromo Nazionale Monza to Monza	112.7 km (70 mi)		Plain stage	Shelley Evans (USA)

== Classification leadership ==
There were five different jerseys awarded in the 2010 Giro Donne. In general, these followed the same format as those in the men's Giro d'Italia.

The leader of the General classification received a pink jersey. This classification was calculated by adding the combined finishing times of the riders from each stage, and the overall winner of this classification is considered the winner of the Giro.

Secondly, the points classification awarded the maglia ciclamino, or mauve jersey. Points were awarded for placements at stage finishes as well as at selected intermediate sprint points on the route, and the jersey would be received by the rider with the most overall points to their name.

In addition to this, there was a mountains classification, which awarded a green jersey. Points were allocated for the first few riders over selected mountain passes on the route, with more difficult passes paying more points, and the jersey would be received by the rider with the most overall points to their name.

Fourth, there was the jersey for the Best Young Rider, which was granted to the highest-placed rider on the General classification aged 23 or under. This rider would receive a white jersey.

Finally, there was the jersey for Best Italian Rider, awarded to the Italian rider placed highest in the general classification. This rider would receive a blue jersey.

In addition to the jerseys, an award was given for Best Team. This result was determined by adding the total times of each team's top three riders at the finish of each stage.

Classification leadership by stage
Stage	Winner	General classification	Points classification	Mountains classification	Young rider classification	Italian rider classification
1	Ina-Yoko Teutenberg	Ina-Yoko Teutenberg	Ina-Yoko Teutenberg	Martine Bras	Marianne Vos	Giorgia Bronzini
2	Ina-Yoko Teutenberg	Ina-Yoko Teutenberg	Ina-Yoko Teutenberg	Martine Bras	Marianne Vos	Giorgia Bronzini
3	Ina-Yoko Teutenberg	Ina-Yoko Teutenberg	Ina-Yoko Teutenberg	Martine Bras	Marianne Vos	Tatiana Guderzo
4	Ina-Yoko Teutenberg	Ina-Yoko Teutenberg	Ina-Yoko Teutenberg	Martine Bras	Marianne Vos	Tatiana Guderzo
5	Marianne Vos	Marianne Vos	Ina-Yoko Teutenberg	Martine Bras	Marianne Vos	Tatiana Guderzo
6	Marianne Vos	Marianne Vos	Ina-Yoko Teutenberg	Emma Pooley	Marianne Vos	Tatiana Guderzo
7	Evelyn Stevens	Marianne Vos	Marianne Vos	Tatiana Guderzo	Marianne Vos	Tatiana Guderzo
8	Mara Abbott	Mara Abbott	Marianne Vos	Mara Abbott	Marianne Vos	Tatiana Guderzo
9	Mara Abbott	Mara Abbott	Marianne Vos	Emma Pooley	Marianne Vos	Tatiana Guderzo
10	Shelley Evans	Mara Abbott	Marianne Vos	Emma Pooley	Marianne Vos	Tatiana Guderzo
Final		Mara Abbott	Marianne Vos	Emma Pooley	Marianne Vos	Tatiana Guderzo

== Classification standings ==
Legend
Pink jersey	Denotes the leader of the General classification	Green jersey	Denotes the leader of the Mountains classification
Mauve jersey	Denotes the leader of the Points classification	White jersey	Denotes the leader of the Young rider classification
Blue jersey	Denotes the leader of the Italian rider classification		

=== General classification ===
Rank	Rider	Team	Time
1	Mara Abbott (USA)	USA National Team	25h 15' 54"
2	Judith Arndt (GER)	Team HTC–Columbia Women	+ 2' 05"
3	Tatiana Guderzo (ITA)	Team Valdarno	+ 3' 05"
4	Claudia Häusler (GER)	Cervélo TestTeam	+ 5' 26"
5	Emma Pooley (GBR)	Cervélo TestTeam	+ 7' 29"
6	Yevheniya Vysotska (UKR)	Team Valdarno	+ 8' 23"
7	Marianne Vos (NED)	Netherlands National Team	+ 9' 24"
8	Tatiana Antoshina (RUS)	Team Valdarno	+ 12' 08"
9	Olga Zabelinskaya (RUS)	Safi–Pasta Zara	+ 23' 03"
10	Elena Berlato (ITA)	Top Girls Fassa Bortolo-Ghezzi	+ 25' 50"

=== Points classification ===
Rank	Rider	Team	Points
1	Marianne Vos (NED)	Netherlands National Team	80
2	Ina-Yoko Teutenberg (GER)	Team HTC–Columbia Women	65
3	Judith Arndt (GER)	Team HTC–Columbia Women	62
5	Kirsten Wild (NED)	Cervélo TestTeam	52
5	Mara Abbott (USA)	USA National Team	45
6	Tatiana Guderzo (ITA)	Team Valdarno	44
7	Shelley Evans (USA)	USA National Team	42
8	Giorgia Bronzini (ITA)	Gauss RDZ Ormu	42
9	Emma Pooley (GBR)	Cervélo TestTeam	28
10	Claudia Häusler (GER)	Cervélo TestTeam	22

=== Mountains classification ===
Rank	Rider	Team	Points
1	Emma Pooley (GBR)	Cervélo TestTeam	48
2	Mara Abbott (USA)	USA National Team	43
3	Tatiana Guderzo (ITA)	Team Valdarno	33
4	Evelyn Stevens (USA)	Team HTC–Columbia Women	22
5	Judith Arndt (GER)	Team HTC–Columbia Women	17
6	Martine Bras (NED)	Gauss RDZ Ormu	14
7	Marianne Vos (NED)	Netherlands National Team	7
8	Olga Zabelinskaya (RUS)	Safi–Pasta Zara	7
9	Yevheniya Vysotska (UKR)	Team Valdarno	6
10	Tatiana Antoshina (RUS)	Team Valdarno	6

=== Young rider classification ===
Rank	Rider	Team	Time
1	Marianne Vos (NED)	Netherlands National Team	25h 25' 18"
2	Elena Berlato (ITA)	Top Girls Fassa Bortolo-Ghezzi	+ 16' 26"
3	Shara Gillow (AUS)	Australia National Team	+ 32' 38"
4	Tiffany Cromwell (AUS)	Australia National Team	+ 48' 16"
5	Polona Batagelj (SLO)	Bizkaia–Durango	+ 49' 11"
6	Valentina Carretta (ITA)	Top Girls Fassa Bortolo-Ghezzi	+ 50' 59"
7	Kataržina Sosna (LTU)	Vaiano Solaristech	+ 51' 56"
8	Olena Oliynyk (UKR)	ACS Chirio–Forno d'Asolo	+ 32' 19"
9	Carlee Taylor (AUS)	Australia National Team	+ 57' 13"
10	Lucinda Brand (NED)	Netherlands National Team	+ 1h 15' 15"

=== Italian rider classification ===
Rank	Rider	Team	Time
1	Tatiana Guderzo	Team Valdarno	25h 18' 59"
2	Laura Bozzolo	Team Valdarno	+ 1h 23' 47"
3	Monia Baccaille	Team Valdarno	+ 1h 27' 19"
4	Silvia Valsecchi	Top Girls Fassa Bortolo-Ghezzi	+ 1h 38' 10"
5	Noemi Cantele	Team HTC–Columbia Women	+ 1h 38' 38"
6	Martina Corazza	Team Valdarno	+ 1h 42' 14"
7	Jennifer Fiori	Top Girls Fassa Bortolo-Ghezzi	+ 1h 59' 16"
8	Giorgia Bronzini	Gauss RDZ Ormu	+ 2h 11' 15"
9	Luisa Tamanini	ACS Chirio–Forno d'Asolo	+ 2h 13' 59"
10	Alessandra D'Ettorre	Top Girls Fassa Bortolo-Ghezzi	+ 2h 17' 58"
