= 2008 Giro d'Italia Femminile =

Race details
- Dates: 5–13 July 2008
- Stages: Prologue + 8
- Distance: 809.6 km (503.1 mi)
- Winning time: 21h 18' 40"

Results
Jersey awarded to the overall winner	Winner	Fabiana Luperini (ITA)	(Menikini–Selle Italia–Master Colors)
	Second	Amber Neben (USA)	(Team Flexpoint)
	Third	Claudia Lichtenberg (GER)	(Equipe Nürnberger Versicherung)
Jersey awarded to the points classification winner	Points	Ina-Yoko Teutenberg (GER)	(Team Columbia Women)
	Mountains	Fabiana Luperini (ITA)	(Menikini–Selle Italia–Master Colors)
Jersey awarded to the young rider classification winner	Young rider	Claudia Lichtenberg (GER)	(Equipe Nürnberger Versicherung)

The 2008 Giro d'Italia Femminile, or Giro Donne, was the 19th running of the Giro d'Italia Femminile, one of the premier events of the women's road cycling calendar. It was held over nine stages from 5–13 July 2008. The race was won by Italian Fabiana Luperini (Menikini–Selle Italia–Master Colors) for the fifth time, 10 years since her last victory at the race.

== Route and stages ==
Stage results
Stage	Date	Course	Distance	Winner	Team
P	5 July	Mantua to Mantua	1.2 km (0.75 mi)	Mirjam Melchers (NED)	Team Flexpoint
1	6 July	Asola to Lendinara	131.5 km (81.7 mi)	Ina Yoko Teutenberg (GER)	Team Columbia Women
2	7 July	Ca' Tiepolo Porto Tolle to Rosolina Mare	122.7 km (76.2 mi)	Ina Yoko Teutenberg (GER)	Team Columbia Women
3	8 July	Occhiobello to Altedo	122.8 km (76.3 mi)	Ina Yoko Teutenberg (GER)	Team Columbia Women
4	9 July	Calcinaia to Prato A Calci / Monte Serra	106.4 km (66.1 mi)	Fabiana Luperini (ITA)	Menikini–Selle Italia–Master Colors
5	10 July	Novara to Novara	9.3 km (5.8 mi)	Vicki Whitelaw (AUS)	
6	11 July	Cardano Al Campo to Laveno Mombello	113.4 km (70.5 mi)	Claudia Lichtenberg (GER)	Equipe Nürnberger Versicherung
7	12 July	Macherio to Montevecchia	83.8 km (52.1 mi)	Fabiana Luperini (ITA)	Menikini–Selle Italia–Master Colors
8	13 July	Desio to Desio	118.5 km (73.6 mi)	Ina Yoko Teutenberg (GER)	Team Columbia Women

=== General classification ===
Final general classification (1–10)
Rank	Rider	Team	Time
1	Fabiana Luperini (ITA)	Menikini–Selle Italia–Master Colors	21h 18' 40"
2	Amber Neben (USA)	Team Flexpoint	+ 2' 37"
3	Claudia Lichtenberg (GER)	Equipe Nürnberger Versicherung	+ 2' 40"
4	Tatiana Guderzo (ITA)	Gauss RDZ Ormu	+ 2' 53"
5	Nicole Brändli (SWI)	Bigla Cycling Team	+ 3' 12"
6	Edita Pučinskaitė (LTU)	Equipe Nürnberger Versicherung	+ 4' 58"
7	Anna Sanchis (SPA)	Spain	+ 6' 37"
8	Jolanta Polikevičiūtė (LTU)	Usc Chirio Forno D'asolo	+ 8' 14"
~~9~~	~~Marta Bastianelli~~ (ITA)	~~Team Cmax Dila~~	~~+ 9' 06"~~
10	Judith Arndt (GER)	Team Columbia Women	+ 10' 02"
