= Mara Abbott =

US professional women's bicycle racer (born 1985)

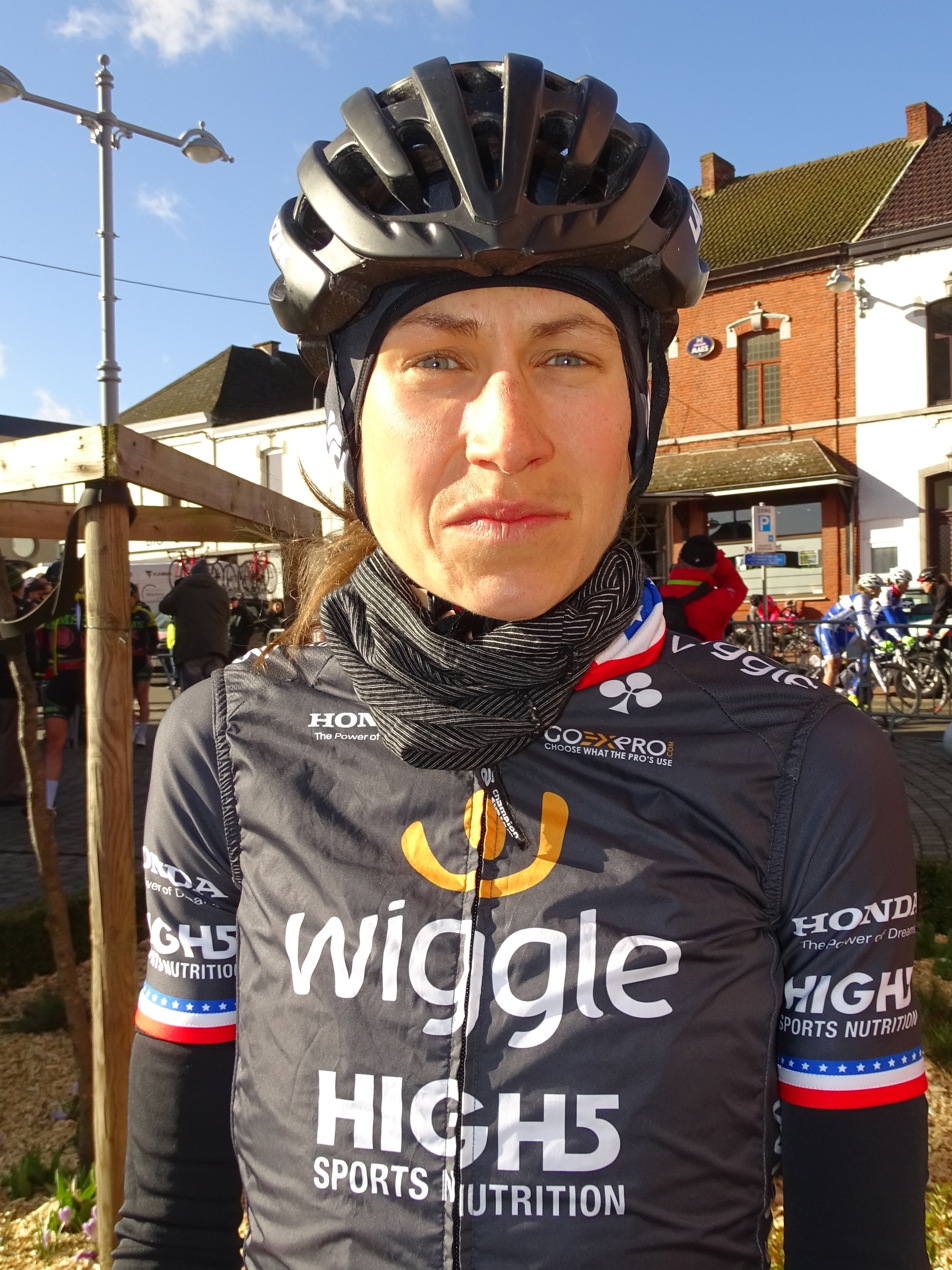

Personal information
- Full name: Mara Katherine Abbott
- Born: November 14, 1985 (age 40) Boulder, Colorado, United States
- Height: 5 ft 4 in (1.63 m)
- Weight: 115 lb (52 kg)

Cycling career
- Sport: Cycling
- Discipline: Road
- Role: Rider
- Rider type: Climbing specialist

Amateur team
- 2015: LA Sweat

Professional teams
- 2007: Webcor Builders
- 2008–2009: HTC-Highroad Women
- 2010: Peanut Butter & Co. TWENTY12
- 2011: Diadora-Pasta Zara
- 2013: Exergy TWENTY16
- 2014: UnitedHealthcare Women’s Team
- 2015–2016: Wiggle High5

Major wins
- Stage races Giro Rosa (2010, 2013) Tour of the Gila (2007, 2010, 2013–2016) Vuelta a El Salvador (2014) One day races National Road Race Champion (2007, 2010)

Mara Katherine Abbott (born November 14, 1985) is an American former women's bicycle racer. In 2010, Abbott became the first US cyclist ever to win the Giro d'Italia Femminile, one of the Grand Tours of women's bicycle racing. Abbott retired after the 2016 Olympic Games road race.

== Early life and amateur career ==
Mara Abbott was born in and, as of 2016, still lives in Boulder, Colorado. She was a competitive swimmer, primarily specializing in distance freestyle races, at Whitman College, which is where she took up road bicycle racing as a springtime activity. After competing for Whitman in two straight National College Cycling Association Division II championships, where the team won back-to-back championships in both the team time trial and the team omnium, and Abbott won back-to-back championships in the road race and also won the criterium and the individual omnium in 2006, Abbott placed fifth in the USA National Championship Women's Road Race. She also won back-to-back championships in the Mount Evans Hill Climb in 2005 and 2006.

== Professional career ==
Abbott turned professional in 2007 and joined the Webcor Builders team. In addition to a repeat of her college successes, she won one stage and the overall title in the Tour of the Gila and the 2007 National Cycling Championships women's road race championship, defeating former champions Kristin Armstrong and Amber Neben in a sprint to the finish. She also continued to swim for Whitman in the fall and graduated with a degree in economics from Whitman.

Abbott joined the HTC-Columbia Women's Team in 2008 and began to excel in European races, winning a mountain stage in the Giro della Toscana. The next year, she won stage 3 and the King of the Mountains jersey in the Giro d'Italia Femminile, finishing second overall. In 2010, Abbott joined the Peanut Butter & Co. TWENTY12 team and repeated her victories at the Tour of the Gila and the USA National Championship Women's Road Race. She won two more stages and the overall championship at the Giro Donne, which was the only women's Grand Tour event held in 2010. That same month, she won one stage and the overall title at the Cascade Cycling Classic. She also won one stage and finished second in the Tour de l'Aude Cycliste Féminin.

For 2011, Abbott moved to the Diadora-Pasta Zara-Manhattan team. She won one stage and finished second overall in the Tour of the Gila, behind 1996 Canadian Olympic medalist Clara Hughes.

In 2013, Abbott won her second Giro Rosa. Later that season it was announced that she would join the new UnitedHealthcare Women’s Team in 2014.

On October 7, 2014, Wiggle High5 announced that Abbott had signed with them for the 2015 season.

On September 20, 2024, Abbott rode the Mountain to Desert Classic in Southwest Colorado

== Off the bike ==
In addition to cycling, Abbott is a yoga instructor. She is a freelance writer published in the Daily Camera in Boulder, Colorado as well as the Wall Street Journal and espnW. As of March 2021, she works for Ceres, a sustainability organization based in Boston.

== Major results ==
2005
3rd Road race, National Under-23 Road Championships
2006
3rd Overall Mount Hood Classic
2007
1st Road race, National Road Championships
1st Overall Tour of the Gila

1st Stage 2

2nd Overall Redlands Bicycle Classic

1st Mountains classification
1st Stage 1

2nd Overall Nature Valley Grand Prix
2nd Overall International Tour de Toona

1st Stage 1

2nd Montréal World Cup
8th Overall La Route de France
9th Overall Giro della Toscana Int. Femminile – Memorial Michela Fanini
2008
1st Stage 4 Mount Hood Classic
1st Stage 1 Tour de Feminin-Krásná Lípa
2nd Time trial, National Road Championships
2nd Overall Redlands Bicycle Classic

1st Prologue

2nd Overall Giro del Trentino Alto Adige-Südtirol

1st Young rider classification

3rd Overall San Dimas Stage Race

1st Stage 1

4th Overall Gracia–Orlová
7th Overall Giro della Toscana

1st Stages 1 (TTT) & 3

2009
2nd Overall San Dimas Stage Race

1st Stage 1

2nd Overall Giro d'Italia Femminile

1st Mountains classification
1st Stage 3

3rd Overall Iurreta-Emakumeen Bira
3rd Boulder Criterium
4th Overall Redlands Bicycle Classic
4th Durango-Durango Emakumeen Saria
7th Overall Giro del Trentino Alto Adige-Südtirol
7th La Flèche Wallonne Féminine
8th Overall Giro della Toscana
10th Grand Prix Elsy Jacobs
2010
National Road Championships

1st Road race
3rd Time trial

1st Overall Giro d'Italia Femminile

1st Stages 8 & 9

1st Overall Cascade Cycling Classic

1st Stage 3

1st Overall Tour of the Gila

1st Stage 1

2nd Overall San Dimas Stage Race

1st Stage 1

2nd Overall Tour de l'Aude Cycliste Féminin

1st Stage 4

6th Overall Redlands Bicycle Classic
2011
2nd Overall Tour of the Gila

1st Stage 1

10th Overall Giro d'Italia Femminile
2013
1st Overall San Dimas Stage Race

1st Stage 1

1st Overall Tour of the Gila

1st Stages 1 & 5

1st Overall Giro d'Italia Femminile

1st Mountains classification
1st Stages 5 & 6

1st Stage 3 Redlands Bicycle Classic
3rd Overall Cascade Cycling Classic
5th Philadelphia Cycling Classic
2014
1st Overall Vuelta a El Salvador

1st Stage 4

1st Overall Tour of the Gila

1st Stages 1 & 5

1st Grand Prix de Oriente
3rd Grand Prix GSB
3rd Grand Prix el Salvador
4th Overall Giro d'Italia Femminile
7th Philadelphia Cycling Classic
2015
1st Overall Redlands Bicycle Classic

1st Stage 3

1st Overall Tour of the Gila

1st Mountains classification
1st Stages 1 & 5

2nd Overall Giro d'Italia Femminile

1st Stage 9

2016
1st Overall Tour of the Gila

1st Mountains classification
1st Stages 1 & 5

1st Mountains classification Tour of California
4th Road race, Summer Olympics
5th Overall Giro d'Italia Femminile

1st Stage 5
