= Tatiana Antoshina =

Russian road bicycle racer

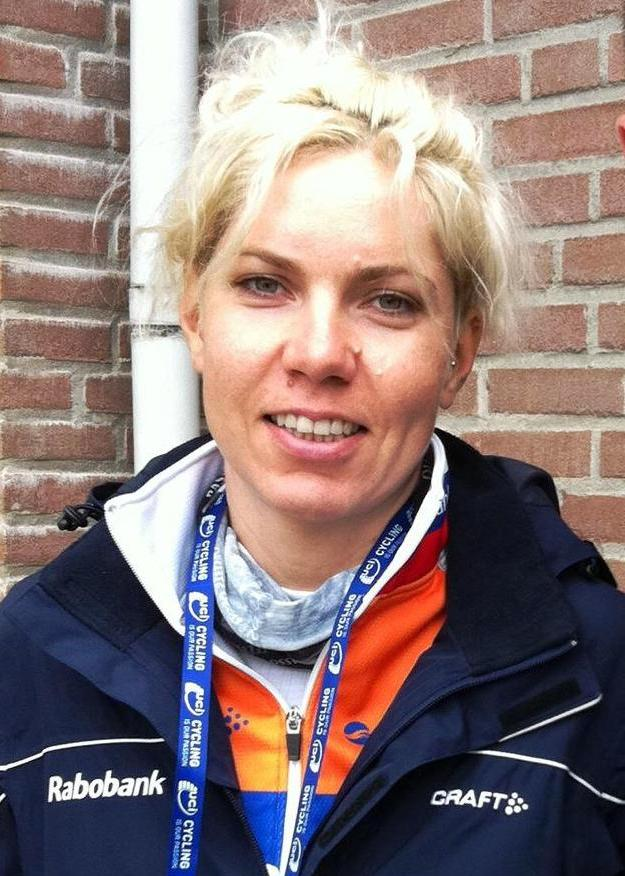
- Antoshina in 2012

Personal information
- Full name: Tatiana Andreyevna Antoshina
- Born: 27 July 1982 (age 44) Moscow, Soviet Union
- Height: 174 cm (5 ft 9 in)
- Weight: 55 kg (121 lb)

Cycling career
- Sport: Cycling
- Discipline: Road
- Role: Rider

Professional teams
- 2006–2008: Fenixs–Colnago
- 2009–2010: Gauss RDZ Ormu–Colnago
- 2010: Team Valdarno Umbria
- 2011: Gauss
- 2012: Rabobank Women Team
- 2013: MCipollini–Giordana
- 2014: RusVelo
- 2015: Servetto Footon
- 2016: Astana

Tatiana Andreyevna Antoshina (born 27 July 1982) is a Russian road bicycle racer.

== Career ==
She competed at the 2012 Summer Olympics in the women's road race, finishing 25th, and in the time trial, finishing 12th.

=== Doping case ===
On July 4, 2016, Antoshina was provisionally suspended by the UCI after a sample taken from May 31 had tested positive for GHRP-2. In May 2017, she was disqualified for four years – backdated to 31 May 2016 – with the suspension lasting until 3 April 2020.

== Major results ==
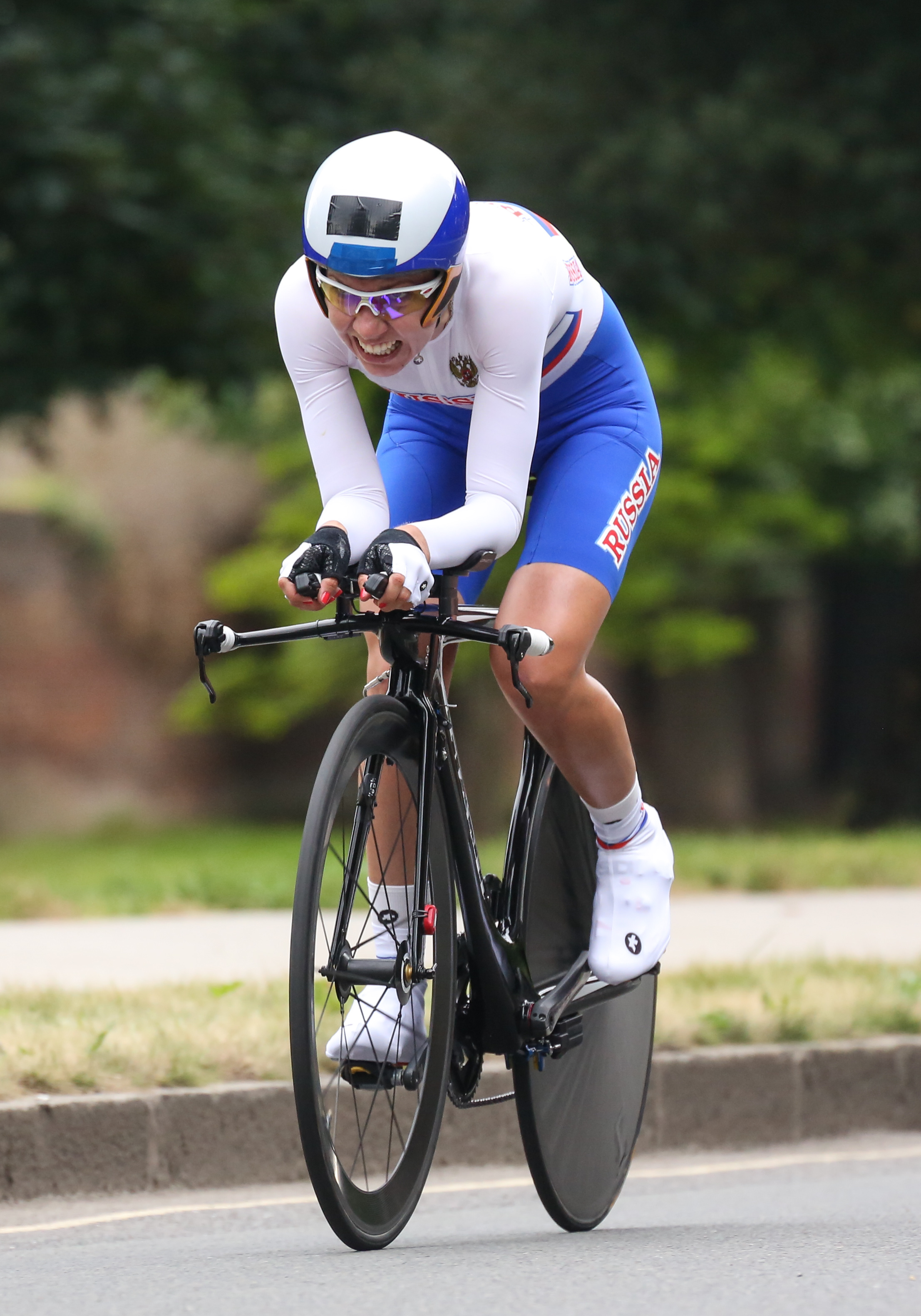
Antoshina during the time trial at the 2012 Summer Olympics

2005
3rd Time trial, National Road Championships
2006
3rd Time trial, National Road Championships
2007
1st Time trial, National Road Championships
4th UCI Road World Championships – Women's time trial
2008
1st GP Jolenka
2nd Time trial, National Road Championships
2nd Giro del Valdarno
4th Time trial, UCI Road World Championships
4th Overall Trophée d'Or Féminin
5th Overall La Route de France
8th Overall Tour Féminin en Limousin
2009
1st Time trial, National Road Championships
7th UCI Road World Championships – Women's time trial
2010
National Road Championships

1st Road race
1st Time trial

2nd Overall Giro della Toscana Int. Femminile – Memorial Michela Fanini
4th Overall Gracia–Orlová
4th Overall Tour Féminin en Limousin
8th Overall Giro d'Italia Femminile
2011
1st Overall Gracia–Orlová
1st Overall Trophée d'Or Féminin
2nd Overall Tour Féminin en Limousin

1st Stage 4

2nd Tour of Flanders for Women
3rd Time trial, National Road Championships
4th Chrono des Nations
5th Overall Giro d'Italia Femminile
5th Overall Giro della Toscana Int. Femminile – Memorial Michela Fanini
2012
3rd Time trial, National Road Championships
3rd Open de Suède Vårgårda TTT
4th Overall Gracia–Orlová
6th Ronde van Gelderland
2013
1st Time trial, National Road Championships
1st Overall Tour Cycliste Féminin International de l'Ardèche
1st Women's Bike Race Montignoso
2nd Overall Tour Languedoc Roussillon
2nd Overall Tour Féminin en Limousin

1st Stage 2

2nd Overall Giro della Toscana Int. Femminile – Memorial Michela Fanini
3rd Overall Giro del Trentino Alto Adige-Südtirol
4th Overall Gracia–Orlová
5th Overall Trophée d'Or Féminin
8th GP de Plouay
9th UCI Road World Championships – Women's time trial
9th Overall La Route de France
10th UCI Road World Championships – Women's road race
2014
National Road Championships

1st Road race
1st Time trial

5th Chrono des Nations
2015
1st Time trial, National Road Championships
1st Overall Tour de Feminin-O cenu Českého Švýcarska

1st Stage 3 (ITT)

1st Ljubljana–Domžale–Ljubljana TT
1st Chrono des Nations
3rd Overall Tour de Bretagne Féminin

1st Stage 2 (ITT)

European Games

4th Time trial
8th Road race

4th Overall Gracia–Orlová
6th Time trial, EPZ Omloop van Borsele
10th Overall Giro della Toscana Int. Femminile – Memorial Michela Fanini
2016
~~1st Time trial, National Road Championships~~
5th Overall Gracia–Orlová
2021
1st Grand Prix Develi
3rd Time trial, National Road Championships
