= Petra Walczewski =

Swiss cyclist

Personal information
- Full name: Petra Walczewski
- Born: 27 April 1968 (age 58) Switzerland
- Height: 166 cm (5 ft 5 in)
- Weight: 52 kg (115 lb)

Cycling career
- Sport: Cycling
- Discipline: Road cycling
- Role: Rider

Petra Walczewski (born 27 April 1968) is a road cyclist from Switzerland. She represented her nation at the 1992 Summer Olympics in the women's road race.
