= Michela Fanini =

Italian cyclist (1973–1994)

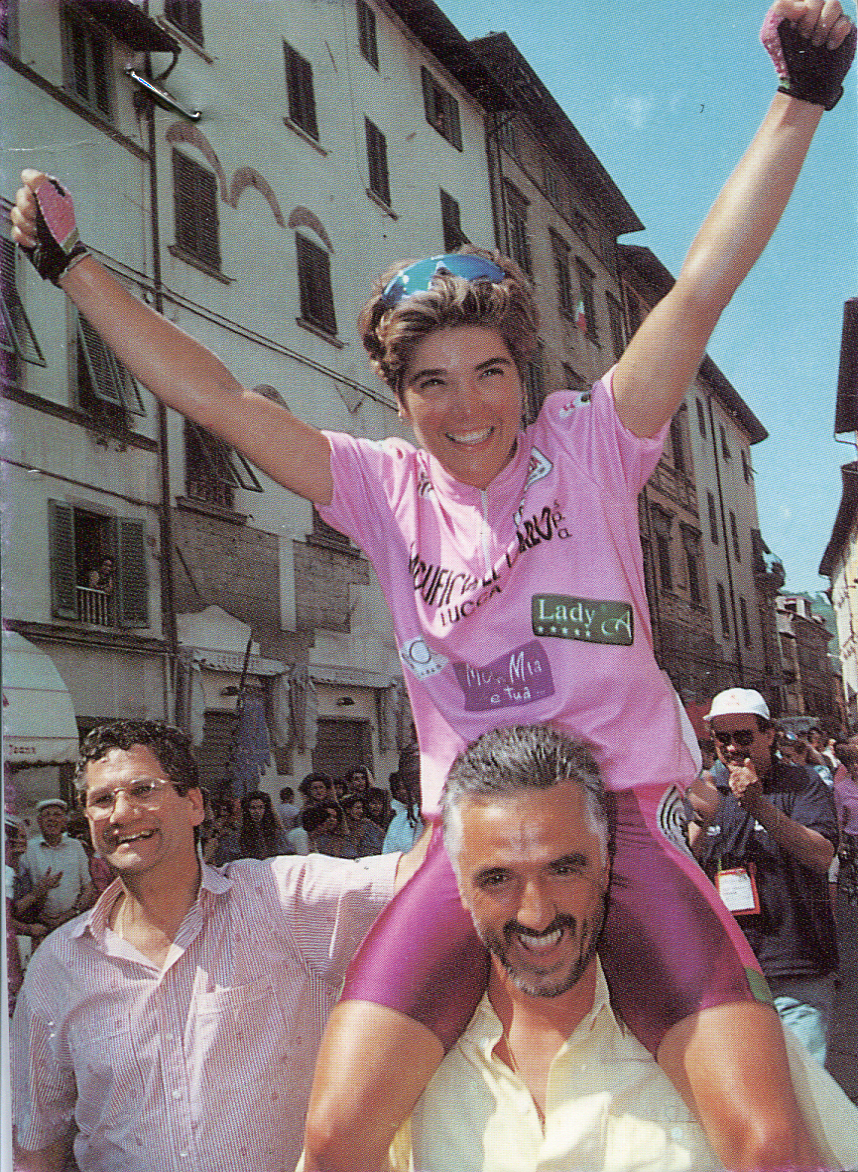
- Fanini celebrating with her uncle after winning the 1994 Giro d'Italia Femminile

Personal information
- Full name: Michela Fanini
- Born: 23 March 1973 Lucca, Italy
- Died: 26 October 1994 (aged 21) Capannori, Italy

Cycling career
- Sport: Cycling

Major wins
- National Road Champion (1992); Giro d'Italia Femminile (1994)

Michela Fanini (23 March 1973 – 26 October 1994) was an Italian racing cyclist. Born in Lucca, her biggest achievements were winning the Giro d'Italia Femminile in 1994 and the national title at the Italian National Road Race Championships in 1992. She died in 1994 at age 21 in a car accident in Capannori, Tuscany.

== See also ==
- Michela Fanini at Cycling Archives (archive)
