= Nada Cristofoli =

Italian cyclist

Personal information
- Born: 6 January 1971 (age 55)

Cycling career
- Sport: Cycling

Nada Cristofoli (born 6 January 1971) is an Italian former cyclist. She competed in the women's point race at the 1996 Summer Olympics.
