= Joane Somarriba =

Spanish cyclist

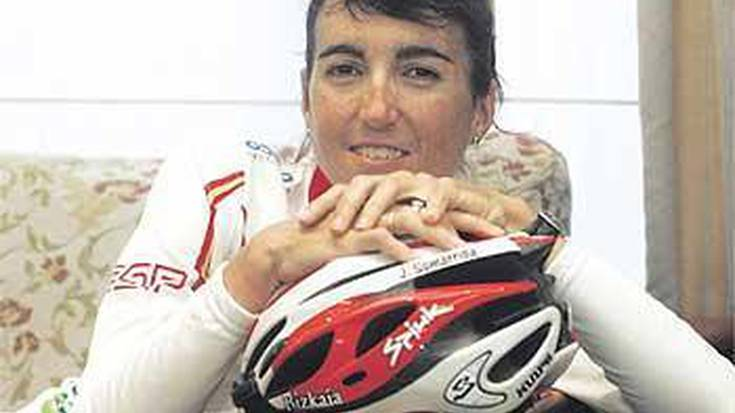

Personal information
- Full name: Joane Somarriba Arrola
- Born: 11 August 1972 (age 54) Gernika, Spain

Cycling career
- Sport: Cycling
- Discipline: Road
- Role: Rider
Medal record
Representing Spain
Women’s Cycling
UCI Road World Championships
Gold medal – first place	2003	Time Trial
Silver medal – second place	2005	Time Trial
Bronze medal – third place	2002	Road race

Joane Somarriba Arrola (born 11 August 1972 in Gernika, Biscay) is a former Spanish cyclist.

She won the Grande Boucle in 2000, 2001 and 2003. She achieved a time trial victory at the 2003 World Championships in Hamilton, Canada. Additionally, she was a time trial silver medallist at the 2005 World Championships in Madrid and took a road race bronze medal at the 2002 World Championships in Zolder/Hasselt, Belgium.

She retired from cycling in 2005.

== Major results ==
1987
1st National Road Race Championship (Juniors)

1988
1st National Road Race Championship (Juniors)
3rd Overall Emakumeen Euskal Bira

1st Prologue

1989
2nd National Road Race Championship

1991
1st Overall Emakumeen Euskal Bira
1st Stages 2 & 3

1993
3rd National Road Race Championship

1994
1st National Road Race Championship

1996
1st National Time Trial Championship
3rd Overall Emakumeen Euskal Bira
3rd National Road Race Championship

1997
2nd National Time Trial Championship
3rd National Road Race Championship

1998
2nd Overall Emakumeen Euskal Bira
3rd Overall Giro del Trentino Alto Adige - Südtirol

1999
1st Overall Giro d'Italia Femminile

1st Stage 10b

2000
1st Overall Grande Boucle Féminine Internationale

1st Stages 4 & 6

1st Overall Giro d'Italia Femminile

1st Stage 6b

2001
1st Overall Grande Boucle Féminine Internationale

1st Stages 1a, 2 & 10

1st Overall Emakumeen Euskal Bira

2002
1st Emakumen Saria
3rd World Championship Road Race
4th UCI Road World Championships – Women's time trial

2003
1st UCI Road World Championships – Women's time trial
1st Overall Grande Boucle Féminine Internationale

1st Stages 2 & 13

1st Emakumen Saria
3rd Overall Giro d'Italia Femminile
3rd National Road Race Championship

2004
1st Overall Emakumeen Euskal Bira

1st Stages 2, 3a & 3b

1st Emakumen Saria
4th UCI Road World Championships – Women's time trial
7th Olympic Games Road Race
7th Olympic Games Time Trial

2005
1st Overall Trophée d'Or Féminin

1st Stage 3

2nd Overall Giro d'Italia Femminile
2nd UCI Road World Championships – Women's time trial

Preceded by Diana Žiliūtė	Winner of the Grande Boucle; 2000-2001	Succeeded by Zinaida Stahurskaia
Preceded by Zinaida Stahurskaia	Winner of the Grande Boucle; 2003	Succeeded by Priska Doppman
