= Linda Jackson (cyclist) =

Canadian cyclist (born 1958)

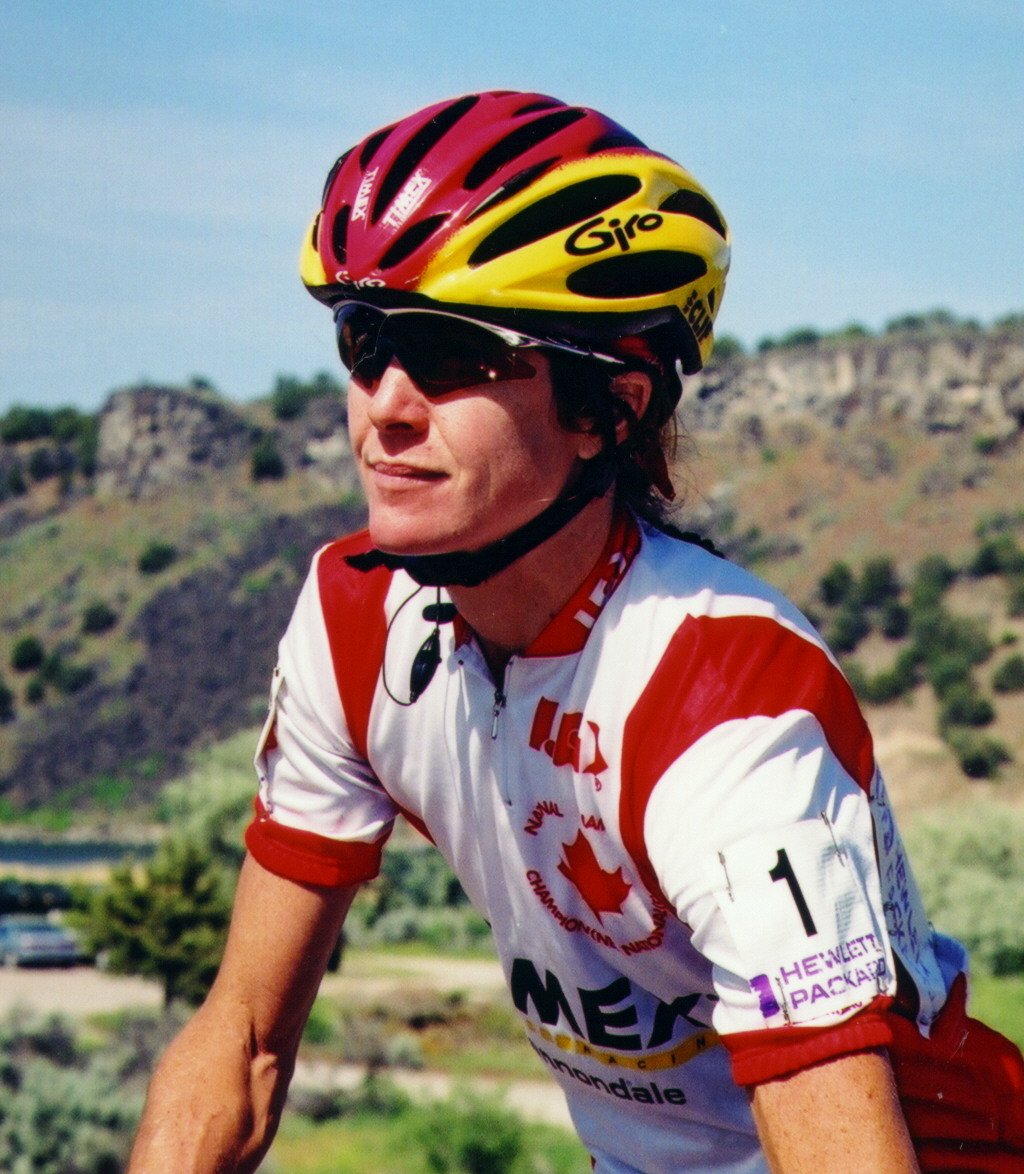
- Linda Jackson, wearing the Canadian national championship jersey in 1999 during the Women's Challenge stage race.

Personal information
- Full name: Linda Jackson
- Born: November 13, 1958 (age 67) Nepean, Ontario, Canada

Cycling career
- Sport: Cycling
- Discipline: Road
- Role: Rider

Professional team
- 1999: Timex

Major wins
- (Canada) National Champion
Medal record
Representing Canada
Women’s Cycling
UCI Road World Championships
Bronze medal – third place	1996	Road race

Linda Jackson (born November 13, 1958) is best known as a former Canadian professional bicycle road racer. She is now a coach, having previous experience as an investment banker. Jackson won the bronze medal at the 1996 World Road Racing Championships. The six-time Canadian national champion (three for road race and three for time trials) competed at the 1996 Summer Olympics and several Pan American Games and won silver medals the 1994 road race and 1998 time trial at the Commonwealth Games.

At the 1994 Redlands Bicycle Classic, the Ontario native placed third overall and won Stage 1, a 48-mile road race. In 1997 she reached the podium again, this time in second overall and won Stage 2, a 13-mile individual time trial.

In 1997, she captured overall win at the Tour de l'Aude Cycliste Féminin and finished second at the Women's Challenge and Giro d'Italia Femminile, and placed third at the Tour de France Feminin. Jackson received the maglia arancia (orange jersey) as the best foreigner of that year's Giro d'Italia Femminile. The following year, Jackson won the 1998 Women's Challenge and repeated her second-place finish at the Giro d'Italia Femminile.

In 2000, she retired from racing, even though she had qualified for the 2000 Summer Olympics. Shortly after announcing her retirement, she began working as a chief financial officer of a San Francisco internet start-up company.

Jackson was the team owner of the EF Education–Tibco–SVB women's cycling team, joining the team in 2004 and becoming the team director in 2005. The team disbanded at the end of 2023, after the sponsors Silicon Valley Bank collapsed, and sponsors EF Education First and TIBCO decided to end their sponsorship of the team.

== Major results ==
1996
7th UCI Road World Championships – Women's time trial
1997
8th UCI Road World Championships – Women's time trial
1998
9th UCI Road World Championships – Women's time trial
