= Gauss RDZ Ormu =

Italian cycling team

Gauss
Team information
- UCI code: GAU (2008–2011)
- Registered: Italy (2008–2011)
- Founded: 2008
- Disbanded: 2011 (Merged with MCipollini–Giambenini)
- Discipline: Road
- Status: UCI Women's Team (2008–2011)

Key personnel
- General manager: Luisiana Pegoraro
- Team manager: Luigi Castelli

Team name history
- 2008 2009 2010 2011: Gauss RDZ Ormu; Gauss RDZ Ormu–Colnago; Gauss RDZ Ormu; Gauss

Gauss (UCI team code: GAU) was an Italian professional cycling team, which competed in elite road bicycle racing events such as the UCI Women's Road World Cup. For the 2012 season the team merged with MCipollini–Giambenini.

== Major wins ==
2008
Stage 2 La Route de France Féminine, Martina Corazza
Stage 2 Tour Féminin en Limousin, Yuliya Martisova
Stage 4 Internationale Thüringen Rundfahrt der Frauen, Grete Treier
Stage 4b Tour de Bretagne Féminin, Tatiana Sharakova
Stage 6 Vuelta Ciclista Femenina a El Salvador, Claudia Leal Balderas

2009
Stage 1 Giro d'Italia Femminile, Edita Pučinskaitė

2010
Stages 2 & 6 Giro della Toscana Int. Femminile, Giorgia Bronzini
Stage 2 Holland Ladies Tour, Martine Bras
Stage 2 Internationale Thüringen Rundfahrt der Frauen, Edita Pučinskaitė
GP Cento – Carnevale d'Europa, Giorgia Bronzini
Stage 2 Ladies Tour of Qatar, Giorgia Bronzini

== National and continental champions ==
2008
Russia Road Race, Yuliya Martisova
Belarus Road Race, Tatiana Sharakova
Estonia Road Race, Grete Treier
Estonia Time Trial, Grete Treier
Belarus Time Trial, Tatiana Sharakova
Italy Time Trial, Tatiana Guderzo

2009
Russia Time Trial, Tatiana Antoshina

2010
World Road Race, Giorgia Bronzini
