= Giro d'Italia Women =

Women's bicycle racing event

Race details
- Date: Late June / early July
- Region: Italy
- Nickname(s): Giro d'Italia Donne; Giro Rosa (2013–2020)
- Discipline: Road
- Competition: UCI Women's World Tour
- Type: Stage race
- Organiser: RCS Sport
- Race director: Giusy Virelli
- Web site: www.giroditaliawomen.it

History
- First edition: 1988
- Editions: 37 (as of 2026)
- First winner: Maria Canins (ITA)
- Most wins: Fabiana Luperini (ITA) (5 wins)
- Most recent: Demi Vollering (NED)

The Giro d’Italia Women is an annual women's cycle stage race around Italy. First held in 1988, the race is currently part of the UCI Women's World Tour, and is currently organised by RCS Sport, the organisers of the men's Giro d'Italia. The race was initially branded as the Giro d'Italia Femminile from its inaugural edition to 2008, Giro Donne in 2009, Giro d'Italia Internazionale Femminile from 2010 to 2021, Giro d'Italia Donne in 2022 and 2023, and Giro d'Italia Women since 2024.

The race is "one of the longest and most demanding" races in women's road cycling, with editions featuring ascents of mountain passes as well as individual or team time trials. Some teams and media have referred to the race as a 'Grand Tour'. However, the race does not meet the UCI definition of such an event. It has generally held over eight to ten days in early July each year. The race is owned by the Italian Cycling Federation, with organisation of the race outsourced.

The rider with the lowest aggregate time is the leader of the general classification and wears the pink jersey. While the general classification gathers the most attention, there are other contests held within the Giro: the points classification for the sprinters, the mountains classification for the climbers and young rider classification for the riders under the age of 23. Achieving a stage win also provides prestige, often accomplished by a team's sprint specialist or a rider taking part in a breakaway.

== History ==
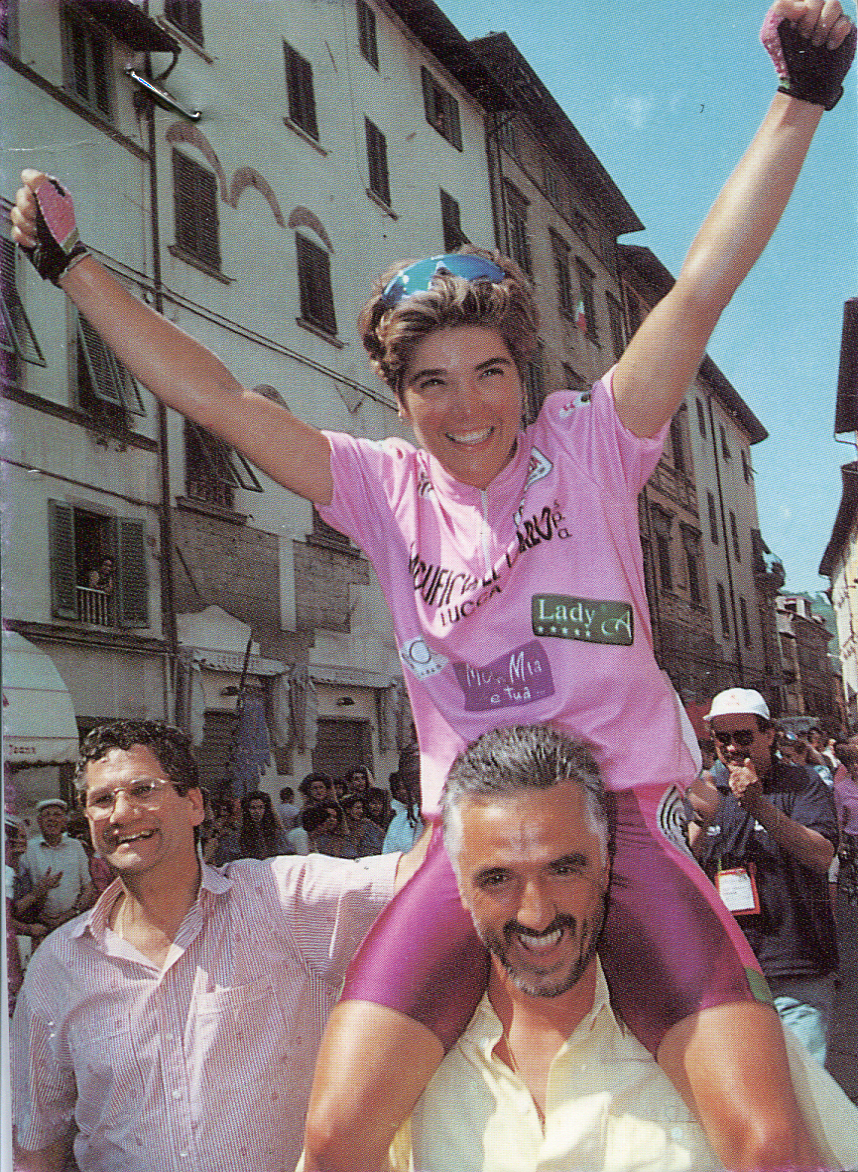
Michela Fanini celebrating her victory at the 1994 race

The men's Giro d'Italia cycling race was first held in 1909, and is considered the second most important cycling race in the world. The women's Giro d'Italia was first held in 1988 as the Giro d'Italia Femminile. The first edition in 1988 was won by two-time Tour de France Feminin winner Maria Canins from Italy.

Global Cycling Network notes "how little we actually know" about early editions of the women's Giro, with no information about stage winners. The race was the second biggest women's race in Italy, behind the long running Trofeo Alfredo Binda-Comune di Cittiglio. In the 1990s, the race was dominated by Italian rider Fabiana Luperini, who won 4 editions of the race between 1995 and 1998, winning 13 stages in the process. Luperini later won the 2008 edition of the race, 10 years after her last victory.

In the 2000s, the race grew to 13 stages in length before falling back to 9 stages. Other big races like Grande Boucle Féminine Internationale and Tour de l'Aude Cycliste Féminin were cancelled due to financial difficulties in 2009 and 2010 respectively, leaving the Giro Donne as the only 'Grand Tour' left in women's cycling after 2010.

In December 2012 it was reported that the company Epinike had withdrawn as Giro Donne organiser, making the 2013 edition uncertain. In April 2013, however, organisers announced they had rebranded the race as the Giro Rosa, taking place over eight days. It returned to its traditional ten-day length the following year. In 2016, the race became part of the new UCI Women's World Tour, organised by the Union Cycliste Internationale (UCI).

In the 2010s and early 2020s, the race was dominated by Dutch riders, with Marianne Vos winning the race three times, and Annemiek van Vleuten and Anna van der Breggen both winning the race four times. In 2021, the race lost its World Tour status due to the lack of live television coverage during the 2020 edition of the race. The decision to downgrade the race to the UCI ProSeries was met with criticism. The race used the Giro d'Italia Donne name in 2021, before returning to Giro Donne in 2022. The race returned to World Tour level in 2022, following promises of live television coverage on Eurosport and Rai Sport. The prize money was also increased to €250,000, with €50,000 for the winner of the general classification. The organisation of the 2023 edition of the race was criticised, with information about the route and riders not available until the last minute.

From 2024, the race will be organised by the men's Giro d'Italia organiser RCS Sport on a four-year contract. The 2024 edition of the race was rebranded to Giro d'Italia Women. In 2024, Elisa Longo Borghini became the first Italian rider to win the race for 16 years, before winning for the second time in succession in 2025.

From 2026, the race will move to June rather than its traditional July date – starting on the same weekend as the finish of the men's race. The race previously had to compete for attention with the more famous men's Tour de France, and organisers stated that they wished to work with the UCI to move the calendar position of the race, so that the race is not overshadowed. The UCI will also award more ranking points to Giro d'Italia Women, Tour de France Femmes and the Vuelta Femenina compared to other races in the UCI Women's World Tour – elevating the three races in status.

== Course ==
Generally held over eight to ten stages, the route of the race changes year to year with ascents of mountain passes as well as individual or team time trials. One of the longest races in women's professional cycling, the course averaged 975 km (606 mi) in length between 2016 and 2026. Between 2014 and 2025, the first stage of the race was a team time trial or a short prologue time trial. From 2024, the rider who passes the highest climb of the race first is awarded the "Cima Alfonsina Strada" – a prize named after Italian cyclist Alfonsina Strada, who took part in the men's Giro d’Italia in 1924. Famous climbs visited by the race include Zoncolan, Mortirolo, Passo de Stelvio and Blockhaus.

In 2015, the first two days took place in Slovenia, with a prologue and a sprint stage. In 2022 and 2023, the race visited Sardinia.

== Winners ==
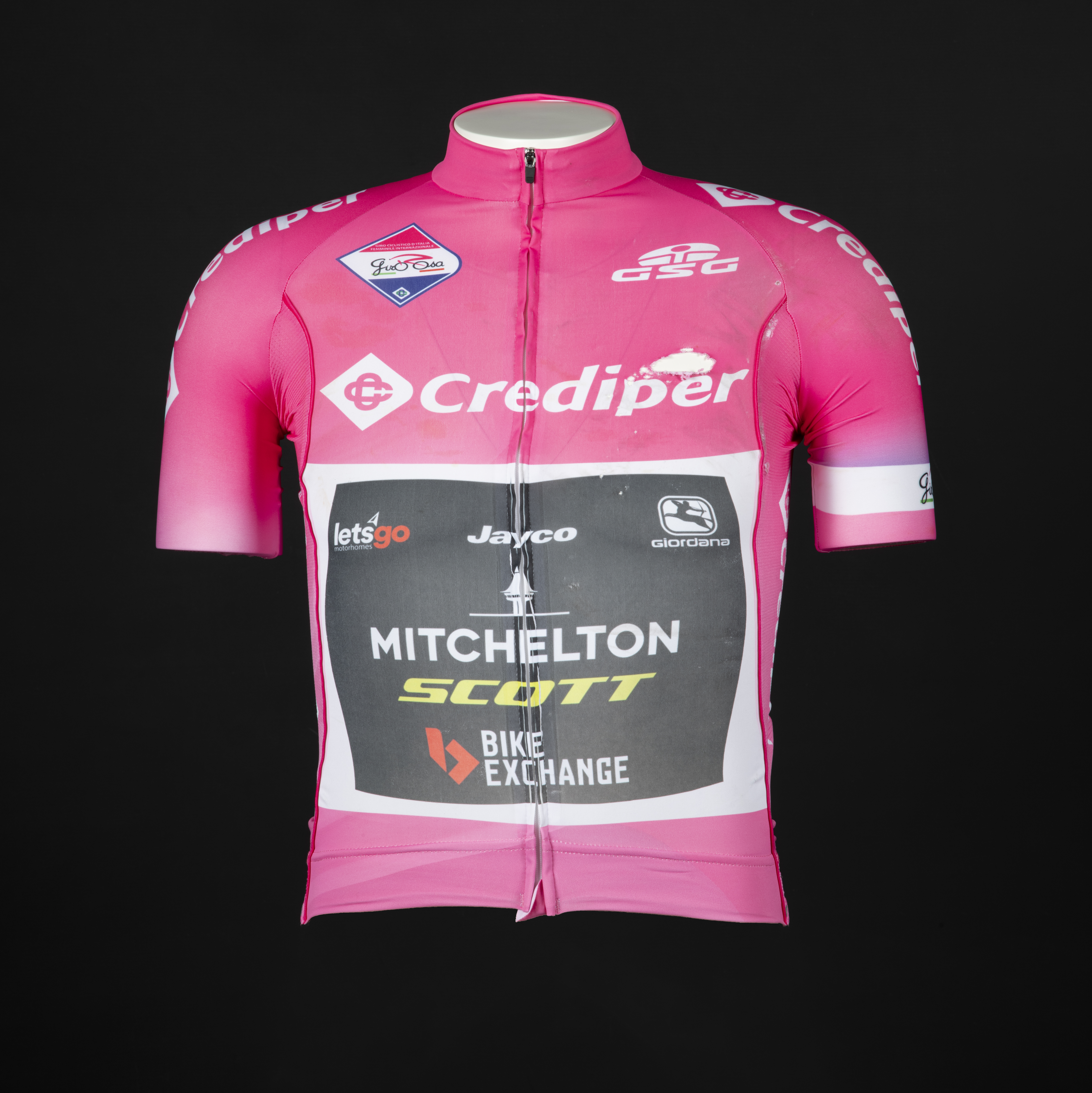
The pink jersey (Italian: Maglia rosa) worn by the leader of the general classification – as worn by Annemiek van Vleuten in 2020

| Year | Distance [km] | NoS | First | Second | Third |
|---|---|---|---|---|---|
| 1988 | 771 km (479.1 mi) | 9 | Maria Canins (ITA) | Elizabeth Hepple (AUS) | Petra Rossner (GDR) |
| 1989 | | 9 | Roberta Bonanomi (ITA) | Aleksandra Koliaseva (URS) | Tea Vikstedt-Nyman (FIN) |
| 1990 | | 9 | Catherine Marsal (FRA) | Maria Canins (ITA) | Kathy Watt (AUS) |
| 1991 | Race not held | | | | |
| 1992 | Race not held | | | | |
| 1993 | | 8 | Lenka Ilavská (SVK) | Luzia Zberg (SUI) | Imelda Chiappa (ITA) |
| 1994 | 681.3 km (423.3 mi) | 7 | Michela Fanini (ITA) | Kathy Watt (AUS) | Luzia Zberg (SUI) |
| 1995 | 976 km (606.5 mi) | 11 | Fabiana Luperini (ITA) | Luzia Zberg (SUI) | Roberta Bonanomi (ITA) |
| 1996 | 1,181.1 km (733.9 mi) | 12 | Fabiana Luperini (ITA) | Alessandra Cappellotto (ITA) | Imelda Chiappa (ITA) |
| 1997 | 1,156.5 km (718.6 mi) | 12 | Fabiana Luperini (ITA) | Linda Jackson (CAN) | Edita Pučinskaitė (LTU) |
| 1998 | 1,173.4 km (729.1 mi) | 13 | Fabiana Luperini (ITA) | Linda Jackson (CAN) | Barbara Heeb (SUI) |
| 1999 | 1,210 km (751.9 mi) | 12 | Joane Somarriba (ESP) | Svetlana Bubnenkova (RUS) | Daniela Veronesi (SMR) |
| 2000 | 1,298 km (806.5 mi) | 13 | Joane Somarriba (ESP) | Alessandra Cappellotto (ITA) | Valentina Polkhanova (RUS) |
| 2001 (Note: The 2001 race win was originally awarded to Belarusian Zinaida Stahurskaya, but she failed a doping control during the race and was stripped of the title nearly a year later) | 1,440.5 km (895.1 mi) | 13 | Nicole Brändli (SUI) | Diana Žiliūtė (LTU) | Edita Pučinskaitė (LTU) |
| 2002 | 889.2 km (552.5 mi) | 9 | Svetlana Bubnenkova (RUS) | Zinaida Stahurskaya (BLR) | Diana Žiliūtė (LTU) |
| 2003 | 888 km (551.8 mi) | 9 | Nicole Brändli (SUI) | Edita Pučinskaitė (LTU) | Joane Somarriba (ESP) |
| 2004 | 852.9 km (530.0 mi) | 9 | Nicole Cooke (GBR) | Fabiana Luperini (ITA) | Priska Doppmann (SUI) |
| 2005 | 858.3 km (533.3 mi) | 9 | Nicole Brändli (SUI) | Joane Somarriba (ESP) | Edita Pučinskaitė (LTU) |
| 2006 | 894.2 km (555.6 mi) | 9 | Edita Pučinskaitė (LTU) | Nicole Brändli (SUI) | Susanne Ljungskog (SWE) |
| 2007 | 895.3 km (556.3 mi) | 9 | Edita Pučinskaitė (LTU) | Nicole Brändli (SUI) | María Isabel Moreno (ESP) |
| 2008 | 808 km (502.1 mi) | 8 | Fabiana Luperini (ITA) | Amber Neben (USA) | Claudia Lichtenberg (GER) |
| 2009 | 918 km (570.4 mi) | 9 | Claudia Lichtenberg (GER) | Mara Abbott (USA) | Nicole Brändli (SUI) |
| 2010 | 921.9 km (572.8 mi) | 10 | Mara Abbott (USA) | Judith Arndt (GER) | Tatiana Guderzo (ITA) |
| 2011 | 962.1 km (597.8 mi) | 10 | Marianne Vos (NED) | Emma Pooley (GBR) | Judith Arndt (GER) |
| 2012 | 961 km (597.1 mi) | 9 | Marianne Vos (NED) | Emma Pooley (GBR) | Evelyn Stevens (USA) |
| 2013 | 803 km (499.0 mi) | 8 | Mara Abbott (USA) | Tatiana Guderzo (ITA) | Claudia Lichtenberg (GER) |
| 2014 | 953 km (592.2 mi) | 10 | Marianne Vos (NED) | Pauline Ferrand-Prévot (FRA) | Anna van der Breggen (NED) |
| 2015 | 913.68 km (567.7 mi) | 10 | Anna van der Breggen (NED) | Mara Abbott (USA) | Megan Guarnier (USA) |
| 2016 | 857.7 km (533.0 mi) | 10 | Megan Guarnier (USA) | Evelyn Stevens (USA) | Anna van der Breggen (NED) |
| 2017 | 1,008.6 km (626.7 mi) | 10 | Anna van der Breggen (NED) | Elisa Longo Borghini (ITA) | Annemiek van Vleuten (NED) |
| 2018 | 975.2 km (606.0 mi) | 10 | Annemiek van Vleuten (NED) | Ashleigh Moolman (RSA) | Amanda Spratt (AUS) |
| 2019 | 905.8 km (562.8 mi) (Note: The race was originally planned to be 918.3 km (570.6 mi) in length, but due to landslides stage 5 had to be shortened and rerouted.) | 10 | Annemiek van Vleuten (NED) | Anna van der Breggen (NED) | Amanda Spratt (AUS) |
| 2020 | 975.8 km (606.3 mi) | 9 (Note: Due to the COVID-19 pandemic the 2020 edition was rescheduled to September and shortened from 10 to 9 stages.) | Anna van der Breggen (NED) | Katarzyna Niewiadoma (POL) | Elisa Longo Borghini (ITA) |
| 2021 | 1,022.74 km (635.50 mi) | 10 | Anna van der Breggen (NED) | Ashleigh Moolman (RSA) | Demi Vollering (NED) |
| 2022 | 1,007.2 km (625.8 mi) | 10 | Annemiek van Vleuten (NED) | Marta Cavalli (ITA) | Margarita Victoria García (ESP) |
| 2023 | 928 km (577 mi) | 9 | Annemiek van Vleuten (NED) | Juliette Labous (FRA) | Gaia Realini (ITA) |
| 2024 | 876.7 km (544.8 mi) | 8 | Elisa Longo Borghini (ITA) | Lotte Kopecky (BEL) | Neve Bradbury (AUS) |
| 2025 | 939.6 km (583.8 mi) | 8 | Elisa Longo Borghini (ITA) | Marlen Reusser (SUI) | Sarah Gigante (AUS) |
| 2026 | 1,153.7 km (716.9 mi) | 9 | Demi Vollering (NED) | Antonia Niedermaier (GER) | Anna van der Breggen (NED) |

=== Multiple winners ===
| Wins | Rider | Editions |
|---|---|---|
| 5 | Fabiana Luperini (ITA) | 1995, 1996, 1997, 1998, 2008 |
| 4 | Anna van der Breggen (NED) | 2015, 2017, 2020, 2021 |
| 4 | Annemiek van Vleuten (NED) | 2018, 2019, 2022, 2023 |
| 3 | Nicole Brändli (SUI) | 2001, 2003, 2005 |
| 3 | Marianne Vos (NED) | 2011, 2012, 2014 |
| 2 | Joane Somarriba (ESP) | 1999, 2000 |
| 2 | Edita Pučinskaitė (LIT) | 2006, 2007 |
| 2 | Mara Abbott (USA) | 2010, 2013 |
| 2 | Elisa Longo Borghini (ITA) | 2024, 2025 |

=== Wins per country ===
| Wins | Country |
|---|---|
| 12 | Netherlands |
| 10 | Italy |
| 3 | Switzerland, United States |
| 2 | Lithuania, Spain |
| 1 | Germany, France, Russia, Slovakia, United Kingdom |

== Secondary classifications ==
The Giro Donne awards a number of jerseys for winners of certain classifications – the current competitions that award a jersey are:

- ( from 1988 to 2023, in 2012) Points classification, for the rider with the most points as awarded by finishing positions on stages and the first riders to go through intermediate sprints. Recently, the winner wears the maglia rossa (red jersey).
- ( from 1988 to 2023) Mountains classification, for the rider awarded the most points for crossing designated climbs, generally at the peaks of hills and mountains. The winner wears the maglia azzurra (blue jersey).
- Young rider classification, for the fastest rider under the age of 25 to complete the race. The winner wears the maglia bianca (white jersey).

Between 2010 and 2023, the maglia azzurra (blue jersey) was awarded to the fastest Italian rider to complete the race. In 2006, the young riders classification was not run, instead a sprints competition was won by Olga Slyusareva (RUS) and awarded the blue jersey.

=== Winners by year ===
| Year | Giro | | Points | | Mountains | | Young | | Italian | | Team | Notes |
|---|---|---|---|---|---|---|---|---|---|---|---|---|
| 1988 | 1 | (Germany) | Petra Rossner | (Italy) | Maria Canins | (East Germany) | Angela Kindling | Not awarded | | (Germany) | West Germany | |
| 1989 | 2 | (Germany) | Petra Rossner (2) | (Italy) | Roberta Bonanomi | | | Not awarded | | | | |
| 1990 | 3 | (France) | Catherine Marsal | (France) | Catherine Marsal | | | Not awarded | | | | |
| 1991 | Race not held | | | | | | | | | | | |
| 1992 | Race not held | | | | | | | | | | | |
| 1993 | 4 | (Switzerland) | Luzia Zberg | (Slovakia) | Lenka Ilavská | | | Not awarded | | | | |
| 1994 | 5 | (Italy) | Imelda Chiappa | (Italy) | Sigrid Corneo | | | Not awarded | | | | |
| 1995 | 6 | (Germany) | Petra Rossner (3) | (Italy) | Fabiana Luperini | | | Not awarded | | | | |
| 1996 | 7 | (Italy) | Fabiana Luperini | (Italy) | Fabiana Luperini (2) | | | Not awarded | | | | |
| 1997 | 8 | (Lithuania) | Diana Žiliūtė | (Italy) | Fabiana Luperini (3) | (Lithuania) | Edita Pučinskaitė | Not awarded | | (Italy) | Sanson Mimosa | |
| 1998 | 9 | (Australia) | Anna Wilson | (Italy) | Fabiana Luperini (4) | (Belgium) | Cindy Pieters | Not awarded | | | | |
| 1999 | 10 | (Russia) | Svetlana Bubnenkova | (San Marino) | Daniela Veronesi | (Russia) | Tetyana Styazhkina | Not awarded | | | | |
| 2000 | 11 | (Russia) | Svetlana Bubnenkova (2) | (Lithuania) | Edita Pučinskaitė | (Switzerland) | Nicole Brändli | Not awarded | | | | |
| 2001 | 12 | (Switzerland) | Nicole Brändli | (United States) | Mari Holden | | | Not awarded | | | | |
| 2002 | 13 | (Belarus) | Zinaida Stahurskaya | (Lithuania) | Jolanta Polikevičiūtė | | | Not awarded | | | | |
| 2003 | 14 | (Germany) | Regina Schleicher | (Lithuania) | Jolanta Polikevičiūtė (2) | (Lithuania) | Modesta Vžesniauskaitė | Not awarded | | Not awarded | | |
| 2004 | 15 | (Australia) | Oenone Wood | (Russia) | Svetlana Bubnenkova | (United Kingdom) | Nicole Cooke | Not awarded | | (Lithuania) | Safi–Pasta Zara Manhattan | |
| 2005 | 16 | (Italy) | Giorgia Bronzini | (Russia) | Svetlana Bubnenkova (2) | (Belarus) | Volha Hayeva | Not awarded | | Not awarded | | |
| 2006 | 17 | (Sweden) | Susanne Ljungskog | (Lithuania) | Edita Pučinskaitė (2) | Not awarded | | Not awarded | | (Italy) | Top Girls Fassa Bortolo Raxy Line | |
| 2007 | 18 | (Netherlands) | Marianne Vos | (Russia) | Svetlana Bubnenkova (3) | (Italy) | Tatiana Guderzo | Not awarded | | | | |
| 2008 | 19 | (Germany) | Ina-Yoko Teutenberg | (Italy) | Fabiana Luperini (5) | (Germany) | Claudia Häusler | Not awarded | | | | |
| 2009 | 20 | (Germany) | Claudia Häusler | (United States) | Mara Abbott | (United Kingdom) | Lizzie Armitstead | Not awarded | | | | |
| 2010 | 21 | (Netherlands) | Marianne Vos (2) | (United Kingdom) | Emma Pooley | (Netherlands) | Marianne Vos | (Italy) | Tatiana Guderzo | | | |
| 2011 | 22 | (Netherlands) | Marianne Vos (3) | (Netherlands) | Marianne Vos | (Italy) | Elena Berlato | (Italy) | Tatiana Guderzo (2) | | | |
| 2012 | 23 | (Netherlands) | Marianne Vos (4) | (United Kingdom) | Emma Pooley (2) | (Italy) | Elisa Longo Borghini | (Italy) | Fabiana Luperini | | | |
| 2013 | 24 | (Netherlands) | Marianne Vos (5) | (United States) | Mara Abbott (2) | (Italy) | Francesca Cauz | (Italy) | Tatiana Guderzo (3) | | | |
| 2014 | 25 | (Netherlands) | Marianne Vos (6) | (United Kingdom) | Emma Pooley (3) | (France) | Pauline Ferrand-Prévot | (Italy) | Elisa Longo Borghini | | | |
| 2015 | 26 | (United States) | Megan Guarnier | (Brazil) | Flávia Oliveira | (Poland) | Katarzyna Niewiadoma | (Italy) | Elisa Longo Borghini (2) | | | |
| 2016 | 27 | (United States) | Megan Guarnier (2) | (Italy) | Elisa Longo Borghini | (Poland) | Katarzyna Niewiadoma (2) | (Italy) | Tatiana Guderzo (4) | | | |
| 2017 | 28 | (Netherlands) | Annemiek van Vleuten | (Netherlands) | Annemiek van Vleuten | (Denmark) | Cecilie Uttrup Ludwig | (Italy) | Elisa Longo Borghini (3) | (Netherlands) | Boels–Dolmans | |
| 2018 | 29 | (Netherlands) | Annemiek van Vleuten (2) | (Australia) | Amanda Spratt | (Italy) | Sofia Bertizzolo | (Italy) | Elisa Longo Borghini (4) | (Netherlands) | Team Sunweb | |
| 2019 | 30 | (Netherlands) | Annemiek van Vleuten (3) | (Netherlands) | Annemiek van Vleuten (2) | (France) | Juliette Labous | (Italy) | Elisa Longo Borghini (5) | (Germany) | WNT–Rotor Pro Cycling | |
| 2020 | 31 | (Netherlands) | Marianne Vos (7) | (Denmark) | Cecilie Uttrup Ludwig | (New Zealand) | Mikayla Harvey | (Italy) | Elisa Longo Borghini (6) | (Netherlands) | CCC - Liv | |
| 2021 | 32 | (Netherlands) | Anna van der Breggen | (Netherlands) | Lucinda Brand | (New Zealand) | Niamh Fisher-Black | (Italy) | Marta Cavalli | (Netherlands) | SD Worx | |
| 2022 | 33 | (Netherlands) | Annemiek van Vleuten (4) | (United States) | Kristen Faulkner | (New Zealand) | Niamh Fisher-Black (2) | (Italy) | Marta Cavalli (2) | (France) | FDJ Nouvelle-Aquitaine Futuroscope | |
| 2023 | 34 | (Netherlands) | Annemiek van Vleuten (5) | (Netherlands) | Annemiek van Vleuten (3) | (Italy) | Gaia Realini | (Italy) | Gaia Realini | (Spain) | Movistar Team | |
| 2024 | 35 | (Belgium) | Lotte Kopecky | (Belgium) | Justine Ghekiere | (Australia) | Neve Bradbury | Not awarded | | (Australia) | Liv AlUla Jayco | |
| 2025 | 36 | (Netherlands) | Lorena Wiebes | (Australia) | Sarah Gigante | (Germany) | Antonia Niedermaier | Not awarded | | (Belgium) | AG Insurance–Soudal | |
| 2026 | 37 | (Italy) | Elisa Balsamo | (Netherlands) | Demi Vollering | (Canada) | Isabella Holmgren | Not awarded | | (Belgium) | Lidl–Trek | |
| Year | Giro | | Points | | Mountains | | Young | | Italian | | Team | Notes |

=== Winners by country ===
| Rank | Country | Points | Mountains | Youth | Total |
|---|---|---|---|---|---|
| 1 | Netherlands | 14 | 5 | 1 | 20 |
| 2 | Italy | 3 | 9 | 6 | 18 |
| 3 | Germany | 6 | 0 | 2 | 8 |
| 3 | Lithuania | 1 | 4 | 2 | 7 |
| 5 | Russia | 2 | 3 | 1 | 6 |
| 5 | United States | 2 | 4 | 0 | 6 |
| 7 | United Kingdom | 0 | 3 | 2 | 5 |
| 8 | France | 1 | 1 | 2 | 4 |
| 8 | Australia | 2 | 2 | 1 | 5 |
| 10 | Switzerland | 2 | 0 | 1 | 3 |
| 10 | Belgium | 1 | 1 | 1 | 3 |
| 10 | New Zealand | 0 | 0 | 3 | 3 |
| 12 | Belarus | 1 | 0 | 1 | 2 |
| 12 | Denmark | 0 | 1 | 1 | 2 |
| 12 | Poland | 0 | 0 | 2 | 2 |
| 15 | Brazil | 0 | 1 | 0 | 1 |
| 15 | San Marino | 0 | 1 | 0 | 1 |
| 15 | Slovakia | 0 | 1 | 0 | 1 |
| 15 | Sweden | 1 | 0 | 0 | 1 |

== Stage wins ==
| Rank | Rider | Stage wins |
|---|---|---|
| 1 | Marianne Vos (NED) | 32 |
| 2 | Petra Rossner (GER) | 18 |
| 3 | Annemiek van Vleuten (NED) | 16 |

== See also ==
- Tour de France Femmes – a stage race in France
- La Vuelta Femenina – a stage race in Spain
