= 2011 Giro d'Italia Femminile =

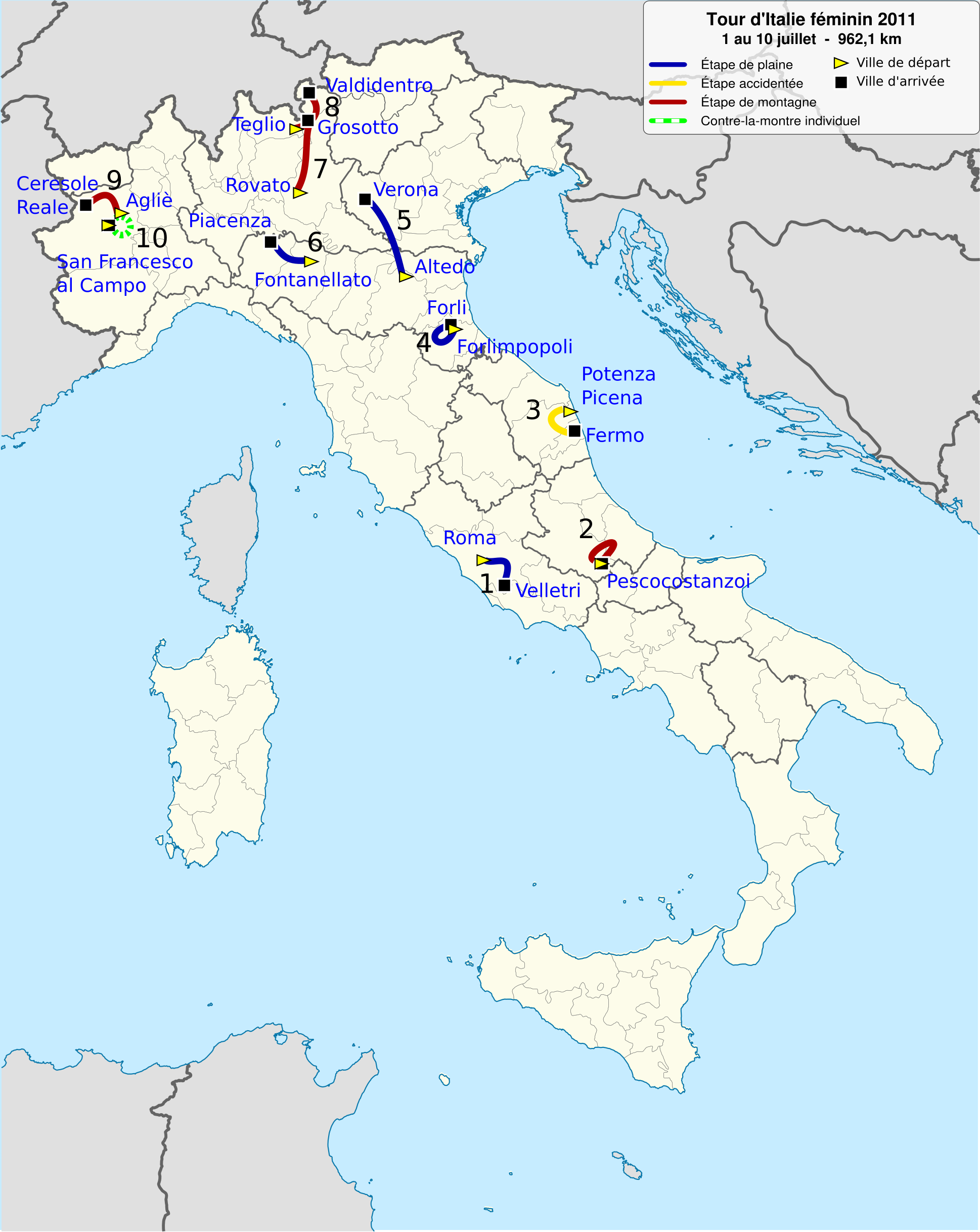

Race details
- Dates: 1–10 July 2012
- Stages: 10
- Distance: 962.1 km (597.8 mi)

Results
Jersey awarded to the overall winner	Winner	Marianne Vos (NED)	(Nederland Bloeit)
	Second	Emma Pooley (GBR)	(Garmin–Cervélo)
	Third	Judith Arndt (GER)	(HTC–Highroad Women)
Jersey awarded to the points classification winner	Points	Marianne Vos (NED)	(Nederland Bloeit)
Jersey awarded to the mountains classification winner	Mountains	Marianne Vos (NED)	(Nederland Bloeit)
Jersey awarded to the youth classification winner	Youth	Elena Berlato (ITA)	(TopGirls-Fassa Bortolo)

The 2011 Giro d'Italia Femminile, or Giro Donne, was the 22nd running of the Giro d'Italia Femminile. It was held over ten stages from 1 to 10 July 2012, starting in Rome and finishing with an individual time trial in San Francesco al Campo near Turin.

== Stages ==
=== Stage 1 ===
- 1 July: Rome > Velletri – 86 km

Stage 1 result

	Rider	Team	Time
1	(Netherlands) Marianne Vos	Nederland Bloeit	2h 11'56"
2	(Germany) Ina-Yoko Teutenberg	HTC–Highroad Women	+ 1"
3	(Sweden) Emma Johansson	Hitec Products UCK	s.t.

General classification after stage 1

	Rider	Team	Time
1	(Netherlands) Marianne Vos	Nederland Bloeit	2h 11'46"
2	(Germany) Ina-Yoko Teutenberg	HTC–Highroad Women	+ 5"
3	(Sweden) Emma Johansson	Hitec Products UCK	+ 7"

=== Stage 2 ===
- 2 July: Pescocostanzo > Pescocostanzo – 91 km

Stage 2 result

	Rider	Team	Time
1	(Australia) Shara Gillow	Bizkaia–Durango	2h 37'48"
2	(United Kingdom) Sharon Laws	Garmin–Cervélo	s.t.
3	(Poland) Sylwia Kapusta	Gauss	+ 10"

General classification after stage 2

	Rider	Team	Time
1	(Australia) Shara Gillow	Bizkaia–Durango	4h 49'35"
2	(United Kingdom) Sharon Laws	Garmin–Cervélo	+ 4"
3	(Poland) Sylwia Kapusta	Gauss	+ 16"

=== Stage 3 ===
- 3 July: Potenza Picena > Fermo – 104,3 km

Stage 3 result

	Rider	Team	Time
1	(Netherlands) Marianne Vos	Nederland Bloeit	2h 58'04"
2	(United Kingdom) Emma Pooley	Garmin–Cervélo	+ 19"
3	(Germany) Judith Arndt	HTC–Highroad Women	+ 2'50"

General classification after stage 3

	Rider	Team	Time
1	(Netherlands) Marianne Vos	Nederland Bloeit	7h 50'46"
2	(Poland) Sylwia Kapusta	Gauss	+ 8"
3	(United Kingdom) Emma Pooley	Garmin–Cervélo	+ 36"

=== Stage 4 ===
- 4 July: Forlimpopoli > Forlì – 101 km

Stage 4 result

	Rider	Team	Time
1	(Germany) Ina-Yoko Teutenberg	HTC–Highroad Women	1h 51'50"
2	(Italy) Giorgia Bronzini	Forno d'Asolo Colavita	s.t.
3	(Italy) Monia Baccaille	MCipollini–Giambenini	s.t.

General classification after stage 1

	Rider	Team	Time
1	(Netherlands) Marianne Vos	Nederland Bloeit	9h 42'36"
2	(Poland) Sylwia Kapusta	Gauss	+ 8"
3	(United Kingdom) Emma Pooley	Garmin–Cervélo	+ 36"

=== Stage 5 ===
- 5 July: Altedo > Verona – 129 km

Stage 5 result

	Rider	Team	Time
1	(United Kingdom) Nicole Cooke	MCipollini–Giambenini	3h 07'15"
2	(Netherlands) Marianne Vos	Nederland Bloeit	+ 4"
3	(Germany) Ina-Yoko Teutenberg	HTC–Highroad Women	s.t.

General classification after stage 5

	Rider	Team	Time
1	(Netherlands) Marianne Vos	Nederland Bloeit	12h 49'49"
2	(Poland) Sylwia Kapusta	Gauss	+ 14"
3	(United Kingdom) Emma Pooley	Garmin–Cervélo	+ 42"

=== Stage 6 ===
- 6 July: Fontanellato > Piacenza – 128 km

Stage 6 result

	Rider	Team	Time
1	(Netherlands) Marianne Vos	Nederland Bloeit	3h 14'07"
2	(Italy) Giorgia Bronzini	Forno d'Asolo Colavita	s.t.
3	(Germany) Ina-Yoko Teutenberg	HTC–Highroad Women	s.t.

General classification after stage 6

	Rider	Team	Time
1	(Netherlands) Marianne Vos	Nederland Bloeit	16h 03'46"
2	(Poland) Sylwia Kapusta	Gauss	+ 24"
3	(United Kingdom) Emma Pooley	Garmin–Cervélo	+ 52"

=== Stage 7 ===
- 7 July: Rovato > Grosotto – 122 km

Stage 7 result

	Rider	Team	Time
1	(Netherlands) Marianne Vos	Nederland Bloeit	3h 39'00"
2	(Italy) Tatiana Guderzo	MCipollini–Giambenini	+ 1'13"
3	(Netherlands) Lucinda Brand	AA Drink–leontien.nl	+ 1'21"

General classification after stage 7

	Rider	Team	Time
1	(Netherlands) Marianne Vos	Nederland Bloeit	19h 42'36"
2	(United Kingdom) Emma Pooley	Garmin–Cervélo	+ 2'36"
3	(Italy) Tatiana Guderzo	MCipollini–Giambenini	+ 4'51"

=== Stage 8 ===
- 8 July: Teglio > Valdidentro – 70 km

Stage 8 result

	Rider	Team	Time
1	(United Kingdom) Emma Pooley	Garmin–Cervélo	2h 25'45"
2	(Netherlands) Marianne Vos	Nederland Bloeit	s.t.
3	(Australia) Ruth Corset	Bizkaia–Durango	+ 1'29"

General classification after stage 8

	Rider	Team	Time
1	(Netherlands) Marianne Vos	Nederland Bloeit	22h 08'15"
2	(United Kingdom) Emma Pooley	Garmin–Cervélo	+ 2'32"
3	(Germany) Judith Arndt	HTC–Highroad Women	+ 7'39"

=== Stage 9 ===
- 9 July: Agliè > Ceresole Reale – 114,8 km

Stage 9 result

	Rider	Team	Time
1	(Netherlands) Marianne Vos	Nederland Bloeit	3h 12'03"
2	(United Kingdom) Emma Pooley	Garmin–Cervélo	+ 12"
3	(Germany) Judith Arndt	HTC–Highroad Women	+ 22"

General classification after stage 9

	Rider	Team	Time
1	(Netherlands) Marianne Vos	Nederland Bloeit	25h 20'08"
2	(United Kingdom) Emma Pooley	Garmin–Cervélo	+ 2'48"
3	(Germany) Judith Arndt	HTC–Highroad Women	+ 8'07"

=== Stage 10 ===
- 10 July: San Francesco al Campo – Individual time trial – 16 km

Stage 10 result

	Rider	Team	Time
1	(Germany) Ina-Yoko Teutenberg	HTC–Highroad Women	22'17"
2	(Sweden) Emma Johansson	Hitec Products UCK	+ 10"
3	(Netherlands) Marianne Vos	Nederland Bloeit	+ 15"
4	(Germany) Judith Arndt	HTC–Highroad Women	+ 23"
5	(Netherlands) Ellen van Dijk	HTC–Highroad Women	+ 30"

General classification after stage 10

	Rider	Team	Time
1	Marianne Vos (NED)	Nederland Bloeit	25h 42′ 40"
2	Emma Pooley (GBR)	Garmin–Cervélo	+ 3' 16"
3	Judith Arndt (GER)	HTC–Highroad Women	+ 8' 15"
4	Tatiana Guderzo (ITA)	MCipollini–Giambenini	+ 9' 09"
5	Tatiana Antoshina (RUS)	Gauss	+ 12' 46"

== Classification ==
There were five different jerseys awarded in the 2011 Giro Donne. These followed the same format as those in the men's Giro d'Italia, and as in the men's race, the leader of the general classification received a pink jersey. This classification was calculated by adding the combined finishing times of the riders from each stage, and the overall winner of this classification is considered the winner of the Giro.

The other jerseys differ in colour from those of the men's Giro:

- The points classification was awarded the maglia ciclamino or mauve jersey. Points are awarded for placements at stage finishes as well as at selected intermediate sprint points on the route, and the jersey is received by the rider with the most overall points to their name.
- The mountains classification was awarded the green jersey (maglia verde). Points were allocated for the first few riders over selected mountain passes on the route, with more difficult passes paying more points, and the jersey is received by the rider with the most overall points to their name.
- The white jersey (maglia bianca) for the best young rider was given to the highest-placed rider on the general classification aged 23 or under on 1 January 2011 (i.e. born in or after 1988).
- The blue jersey (maglia azzura) was given to the highest-placed Italian rider on the general classification.

== Classification progress ==
Stage	Winner	General classification	Points classification	Mountains classification	Young rider classification	Italian rider classification
1	Marianne Vos	Marianne Vos	Marianne Vos	Valentina Scandolara	Elizabeth Armitstead	Rossella Callovi
2	Shara Gillow	Shara Gillow	Marianne Vos	Valentina Scandolara	Valentina Scandolara	Valentina Scandolara
3	Marianne Vos	Marianne Vos	Marianne Vos	Marianne Vos	Rasa Leleivytė	Tatiana Guderzo
4	Ina-Yoko Teutenberg	Marianne Vos	Marianne Vos	Marianne Vos	Rasa Leleivytė	Tatiana Guderzo
5	Nicole Cooke	Marianne Vos	Marianne Vos	Marianne Vos	Rasa Leleivytė	Tatiana Guderzo
6	Marianne Vos	Marianne Vos	Marianne Vos	Marianne Vos	Rasa Leleivytė	Tatiana Guderzo
7	Marianne Vos	Marianne Vos	Marianne Vos	Marianne Vos	Elena Berlato	Tatiana Guderzo
8	Emma Pooley	Marianne Vos	Marianne Vos	Emma Pooley	Elena Berlato	Tatiana Guderzo
9	Marianne Vos	Marianne Vos	Marianne Vos	Marianne Vos	Elena Berlato	Tatiana Guderzo
10	Ina-Yoko Teutenberg	Marianne Vos	Marianne Vos	Marianne Vos	Elena Berlato	Tatiana Guderzo
Final		Marianne Vos	Marianne Vos	Marianne Vos	Elena Berlato	Tatiana Guderzo

== Final standings ==
=== General classification ===
	Rider	Team	Time
1	Marianne Vos (NED)	Nederland Bloeit	25h 42′ 40"
2	Emma Pooley (GBR)	Garmin–Cervélo	+ 3' 16"
3	Judith Arndt (GER)	HTC–Highroad Women	+ 8' 15"
4	Tatiana Guderzo (ITA)	MCipollini–Giambenini	+ 9' 09"
5	Tatiana Antoshina (RUS)	Gauss	+ 12' 46"
6	Ruth Corset (AUS)	Bizkaia–Durango	+ 12' 58"
7	Emma Johansson (SWE)	Hitec Products–UCK	+ 14' 15"
8	Sylwia Kapusta (POL)	Gauss	+ 14' 26"
9	Shara Gillow (AUS)	Bizkaia–Durango	+ 15' 48"
10	Mara Abbott (USA)	Diadora–Pasta Zara	+ 16' 29"
