= Team Cmax Dila =

Italian cycling team

Team information
- UCI code: DGC
- Registered: France
- Founded: 2008
- Disbanded: 2009
- Discipline: Road
- Status: UCI Women's Team

Team name history
- 2008–2009: Team Cmax Dila

Team Cmax Dila (UCI team code: DGC) was an Italian professional cycling team, which competed in elite road bicycle racing events such as the UCI Women's Road World Cup.

== Major wins ==
2008
Overall Tour de Pologne Feminin, Sara Mustonen

== National champions ==
2009
Spain Road Race, Marta Vilajosana Andreu
