= Olena Oliinyk =

Ukrainian bicycle racer

Personal information
- Born: 3 May 1989 (age 37) Ukraine

Cycling career
- Sport: Cycling
- Discipline: Road cycling

Professional teams
- 2010: Acs Chirio–Forno d'asolo
- 2014: Forno d'Asolo–Astute
- 2016: Xirayas de San Luis–OPW

Olena Oliinyk (born 3 May 1989) is a road cyclist from Ukraine. She represented her nation at the 2009 UCI Road World Championships.

She was a member of ACS Chirio - Forno D'Asolo as of 2010, Forno d'Asolo - Astute as of 2014, and of Xirayas de San Luis - OPW as of 2016. She competed on and off from 2006-2016, with her most notable win being her 7th place finish at the Ukraine National Championships in 2014.

== Major results ==
2014
8th Giro dell'Emilia Internazionale Donne Elite
7th Ukrainian National Championships
