= 2021 Israel Start-Up Nation season =

Israel Start-Up Nation
- 2021 season
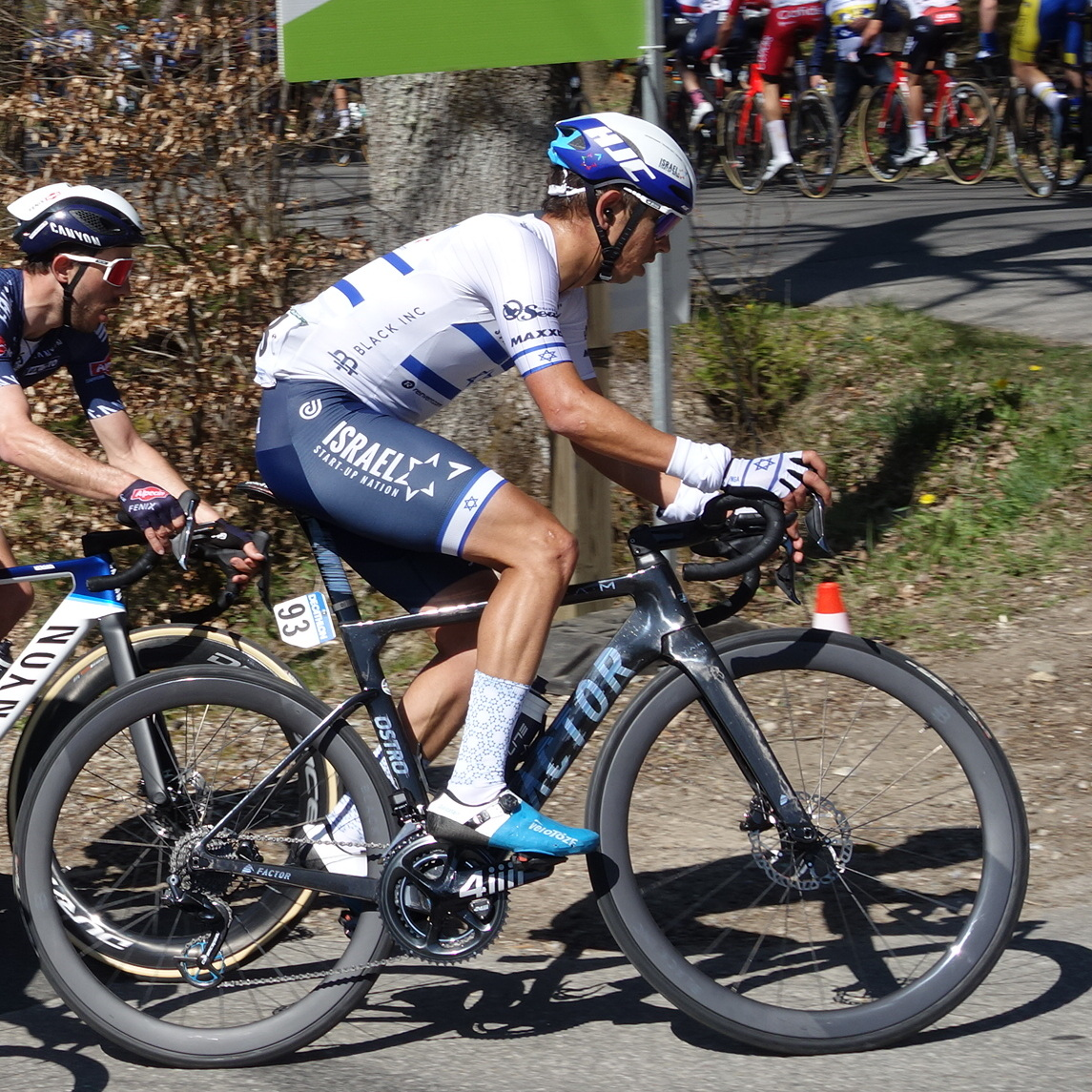
- Omer Goldstein on Liège-Bastogne-Liège
- UCI code: ISN
- Status: UCI WorldTeam
- World Tour Rank: 10th
- Owner: Sylvan Adams; Ron Baron
- Manager: Kjell Carlström (FIN)
- Main sponsor(s): Start-Up Nation Central
- Based: Israel
- Bicycles: Factor
- Groupset: Shimano

Season victories
- One-day races: 3
- Stage race overall: 1
- Stage race stages: 9
- National Championships: 4
- Most wins: Ben Hermans (BEL) (4)
- Best ranked rider: Michael Woods (CAN) (13th)
- Jersey

The 2021 season for Israel Start-Up Nation was the team's second season as a UCI WorldTeam and its seventh season overall.

== Roster ==
As of 1 July 2021.

Rider	Date of birth
Rudy Barbier (FRA)	18 December 1992 (aged 28)
Sebastian Berwick (AUS)	15 December 1999 (aged 21)
Patrick Bevin (NZL)	15 February 1991 (aged 29)
Jenthe Biermans (BEL)	30 October 1995 (aged 25)
Guillaume Boivin (CAN)	25 May 1989 (aged 31)
Matthias Brändle (AUT)	7 December 1989 (aged 31)
Alexander Cataford (CAN)	1 September 1993 (aged 27)
Davide Cimolai (ITA)	13 August 1989 (aged 31)
Alessandro De Marchi (ITA)	19 May 1986 (aged 34)
Alex Dowsett (GBR)	3 October 1988 (aged 32)
Itamar Einhorn (ISR)	20 September 1997 (aged 23)
Chris Froome (GBR)	20 May 1985 (aged 35)
Omer Goldstein (ISR)	13 August 1996 (aged 24)
André Greipel (GER)	16 July 1982 (aged 38)
Carl Fredrik Hagen (NOR)	26 September 1991 (aged 29)
Ben Hermans (BEL)	8 June 1986 (aged 34)

Rider	Date of birth
Hugo Hofstetter (FRA)	13 February 1994 (aged 26)
Reto Hollenstein (SUI)	22 August 1985 (aged 35)
Daryl Impey (RSA)	6 December 1984 (aged 36)
Taj Jones (Note: Jones spent the first half of the year with the team's development squad, Israel Cycling Academy, before joining the senior team on 1 July.) (AUS)	26 July 2000 (aged 20)
Dan Martin (IRL)	20 August 1986 (aged 34)
Krists Neilands (LAT)	18 August 1994 (aged 26)
Guy Niv (ISR)	8 March 1994 (aged 26)
James Piccoli (CAN)	5 September 1991 (aged 29)
Alexis Renard (FRA)	1 June 1999 (aged 21)
Guy Sagiv (ISR)	5 December 1994 (aged 26)
Norman Vahtra (EST)	23 November 1996 (aged 24)
Tom Van Asbroeck (BEL)	19 April 1990 (aged 30)
Sep Vanmarcke (BEL)	28 July 1988 (aged 32)
Michael Woods (CAN)	12 October 1986 (aged 34)
Mads Würtz Schmidt (DEN)	31 March 1994 (aged 26)
Rick Zabel (GER)	7 December 1993 (aged 27)

Riders who joined the team for the 2021 season

Rider	2020 team
Sebastian Berwick	neo-pro (St George Continental Cycling Team)
Patrick Bevin	CCC Team
Alessandro De Marchi	CCC Team
Chris Froome	INEOS Grenadiers
Carl Fredrik Hagen	Lotto–Soudal
Daryl Impey	Mitchelton–Scott
Taj Jones	neo-pro (ARA Pro Racing Sunshine Coast)
Sep Vanmarcke	EF Pro Cycling
Michael Woods	EF Pro Cycling

Riders who left the team during or after the 2020 season

Rider	2021 team
Matteo Badilatti	Groupama–FDJ
Travis McCabe	Retired
Daniel Navarro	Burgos BH
Nils Politt	Bora–Hansgrohe
Mihkel Räim	Mazowsze Serce Polski
Patrick Schelling	
Rory Sutherland	Retired

== Season victories ==
Date	Race	Competition	Rider	Country	Location	Ref.
20 February	Tour des Alpes-Maritimes et du Var, Stage 2	UCI Europe Tour	Michael Woods (CAN)	France	Fayence	
15 March	Tirreno–Adriatico, Stage 6	UCI World Tour	Mads Würtz Schmidt (DEN)	Italy	Lido di Fermo	
23 March	Settimana Internazionale di Coppi e Bartali, Stage 1b (TTT)	UCI Europe Tour	(Note: The winning riders were Sebastian Berwick, Matthias Brändle, Alessandro De Marchi, Alex Dowsett, Ben Hermans, Guy Niv, and James Piccoli.)	Italy	Gatteo	
23 April	Tour of the Alps, Mountains classification	UCI Europe Tour; UCI ProSeries	Alessandro De Marchi (ITA)	Austria		
1 May	Tour de Romandie, Stage 4	UCI World Tour	Michael Woods (CAN)	Switzerland	Thyon 2000	
16 May	Trofeo Alcudia – Port d'Alcudia	UCI Europe Tour	André Greipel (GER)	Spain	Alcúdia	
21 May	Vuelta a Andalucía, Stage 4	UCI Europe Tour; UCI ProSeries	André Greipel (GER)	Spain	Cúllar Vega	
26 May	Giro d'Italia, Stage 17	UCI World Tour	Dan Martin (IRL)	Italy	Sega di Ala	
13 June	Tour de Suisse, Mountains classification	UCI World Tour	Michael Woods (CAN)	Switzerland		
24 June	Giro dell'Appennino	UCI Europe Tour	Ben Hermans (BEL)	Italy	Genoa	
7 August	Arctic Race of Norway, Stage 3	UCI Europe Tour; UCI ProSeries	Ben Hermans (BEL)	Norway	Målselv	
8 August	Arctic Race of Norway, Overall	UCI Europe Tour; UCI ProSeries	Ben Hermans (BEL)	Norway		
26 August	Tour Poitou-Charentes en Nouvelle-Aquitaine, Stage 4 (ITT)	UCI Europe Tour	Ben Hermans (BEL)	France	Loudun	
19 September	Okolo Slovenska, Stage 4	UCI Europe Tour	Itamar Einhorn (ISR)	Slovakia	Trnava	
5 October	Tre Valli Varesine	UCI Europe Tour	Alessandro De Marchi (ITA)	Italy	Varese	

== National, Continental, and World Champions ==
Date	Discipline	Jersey	Rider	Country	Location	Ref.
12 June	Israeli National Time Trial Championships		Omer Goldstein (ISR)	Israel	Atlit	
19 June	Austrian National Time Trial Championships		Matthias Brändle (AUT)	Austria	Kufstein	
20 June	Danish National Road Race Championships		Mads Würtz Schmidt (DEN)	Denmark	Give	
11 September	Canadian National Road Race Championships		Guillaume Boivin (CAN)	Canada	Saint-Georges	
