= 2026 national road cycling championships =

The 2026 national road cycling championships are being held throughout the year and are organised by the UCI member federations. They began in Australia with the Australian National Time Trial Championships events on 9 January.

== Jerseys ==
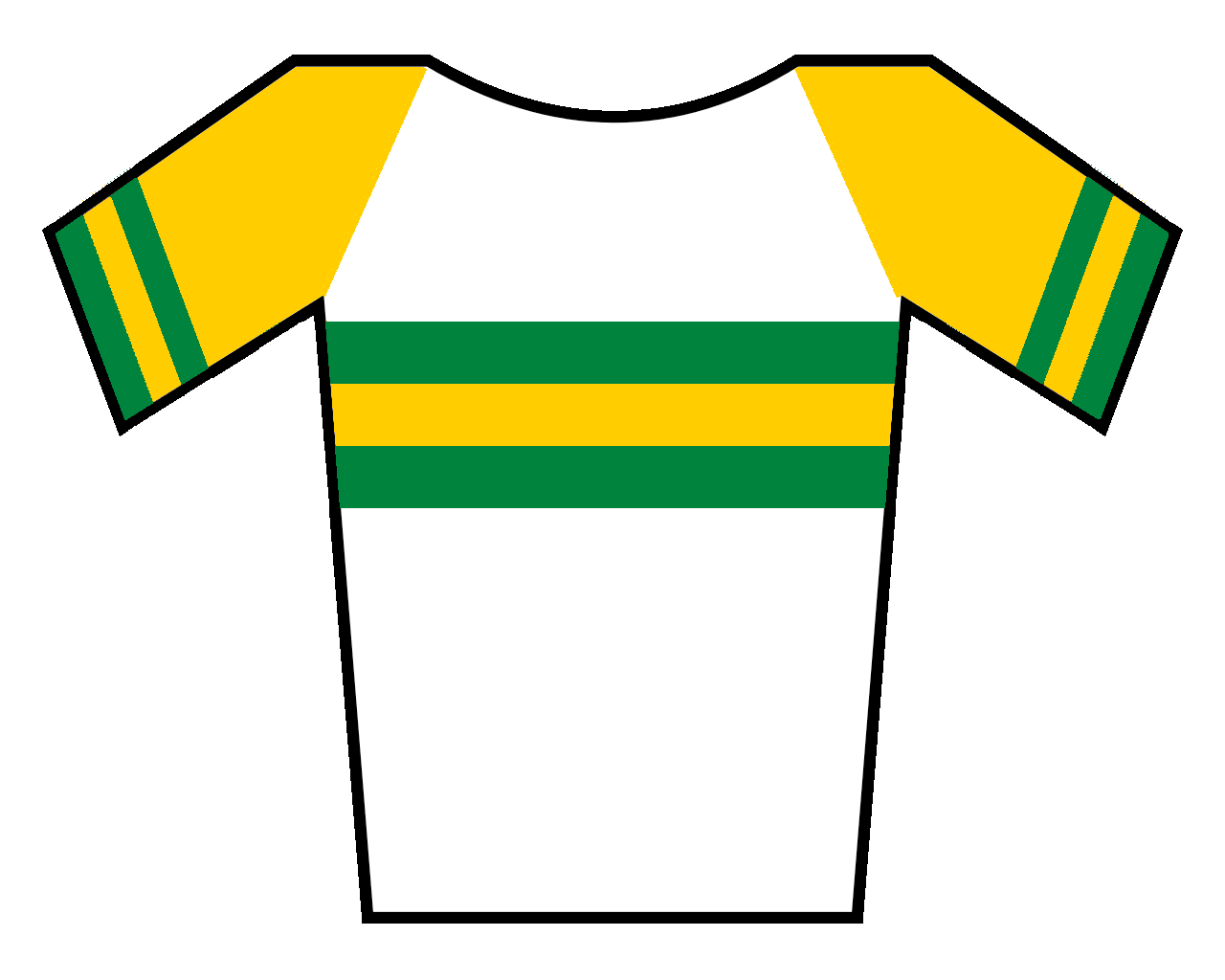
Australia Champion

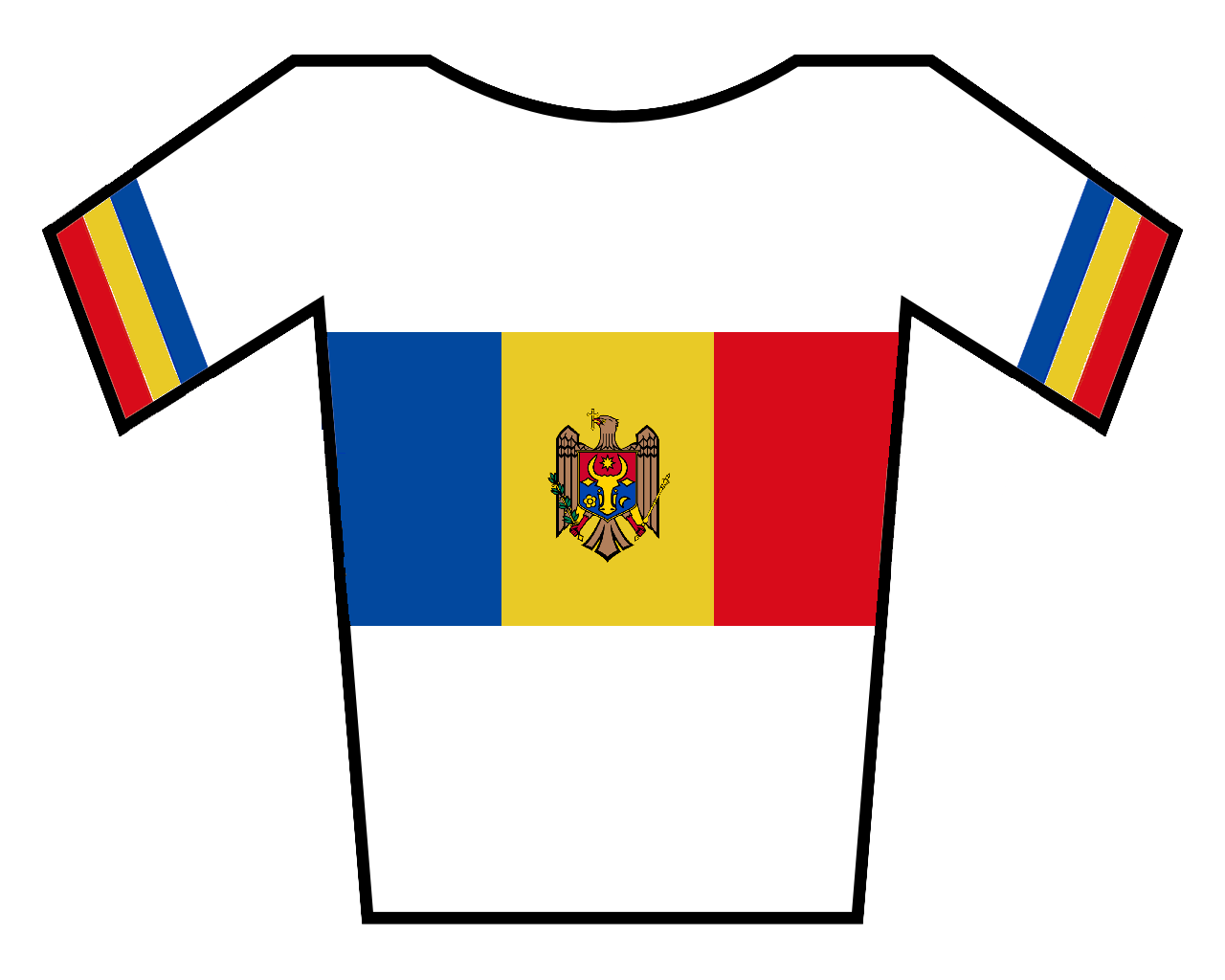
Moldovan Champion

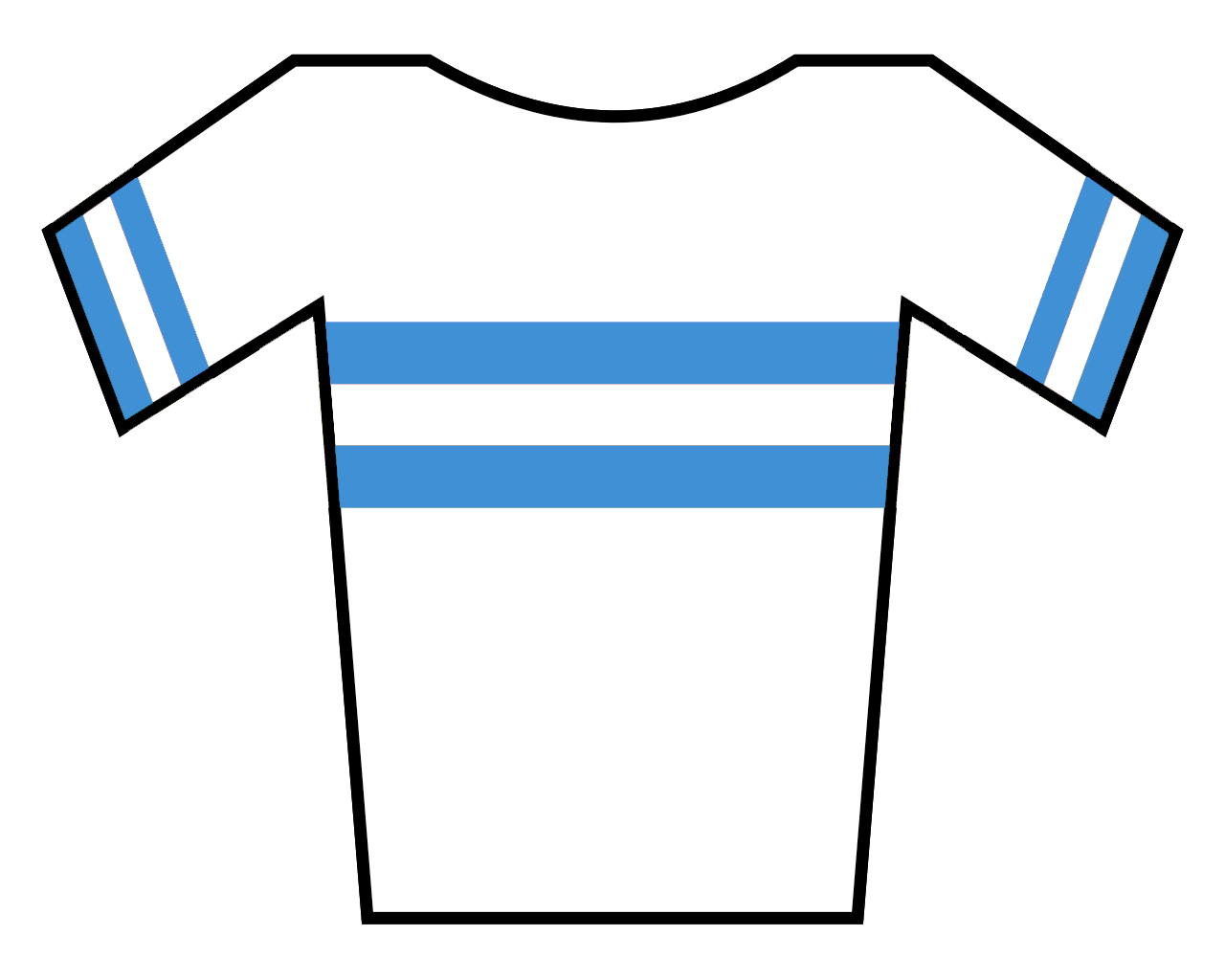
Argentina
Champion

The winner of each national championship wears the national jersey in all their races for the next year in the respective discipline, apart from the World Championships and the Olympics, or unless they are wearing a classification leader's jersey in a stage race. Most national champion jerseys tend to represent a country's flag or use the colours from it, like the Spanish and British jerseys, respectively. Jerseys may also feature traditional sporting colours of a country that are not derived from a national flag, such as the green and gold jerseys of Australian national champions.

== 2026 champions ==
=== Men's Elite ===
Country	Men's Elite Road Race Champion	Road Race Champion's Team	Men's Elite Time Trial Champion	Time Trial Champion's Team
Albania	Valentino Kamberaj	Team Skyline	Lukas Sulaj Kloppenborg	Sidi Ali–Unlock Sports Team
Antigua and Barbuda	Alexander Whittaker		Alexander Whittaker	
Algeria	Hamza Amari	Madar Pro Cycling Team	Yacine Hamza	Madar Pro Cycling Team
Argentina	Nicolás Tivani	Aviludo–Louletano–Loulé	Mateo Kalejmann	
Australia	Patrick Eddy	Team Brennan	Jay Vine	UAE Team Emirates XRG
Austria	Michael Gogl	Alpecin–Premier Tech	Felix Großschartner	UAE Team Emirates XRG
Azerbaijan			Musa Mikayilzade	
Bahamas	Rowshan Jones			
Barbados	Liam Hutchinson		Russell Elcock	
Belarus	Mikita Babovich	Bahrain Victorious Development Team	Ilya Slesarenko	Biesse–Carrera–Premac
Belgium	Rune Herregodts	UAE Team Emirates XRG	Alec Segaert	Team Bahrain Victorious
Belize	Derrick Chevarria	China Chermin Cycling Team	Cory Williams	L39ION of Los Angeles
Benin	Ricardo Sodjede			
Bolivia	Eduardo Moyata	Pío Rico Cycling Team	Freddy Gonzales	
Bosnia and Herzegovina	Vedad Karić	Sidi Ali–Unlock Sports Team		
Brazil	João Pedro Rossi	Localiza Meoo / Swift Pro Cycling	Henrique Avancini	Localiza Meoo / Swift Pro Cycling
Bulgaria	Christian Trenchev		Martin Popov	
Canada	Jérôme Gauthier	Project Echelon Racing	Derek Gee-West	Lidl–Trek
Cambodia	Bunhok Sun			
Cameroon	Rodrigue Eric Kuere Nounawe	SNH Vélo Club	Rodrigue Eric Kuere Nounawe	SNH Vélo Club
Chile	Vicente Rojas	Bardiani–CSF 7 Saber	Hector Quintana	Plus Performance–ZEO Sport
China	Su Haoyu	XDS Astana Team	Xue Ming	Li-Ning Star
Colombia	Egan Bernal	Netcompany INEOS	Brandon Rivera	Netcompany INEOS
Costa Rica	Sebastian Calderón	7C–Economy–Hyundai	Donovan Ramírez	Colono Bikestation Kölbi
Croatia	Ivan Luka Tomić		Leon Lukić	Kolesarski Klub Novo Mesto
Cyprus			Bogdan Zabelinskiy	Aarco
Czech Republic	Mathias Vacek	Lidl–Trek	Mathias Vacek	Lidl–Trek
Denmark	Magnus Cort	Uno-X Mobility	Kristian Egholm	Lidl–Trek Future Racing
Dominican Republic	Alberto Rafael Ramos			
Ecuador	Kevin Navas	Best PC Ecuador	Jonathan Kléver Caicedo	Petrolike
Egypt	Omar Elsaid		Hassan Elsaify	
El Salvador			Brandon Ulises Rodríguez	
Eritrea	Milkias Maekele	Netcompany Ineos Racing Academy	Amanuel Ghebreigzabhier	Lidl–Trek
Estonia	Romet Pajur	Red Bull–Bora–Hansgrohe Rookies	Rein Taaramäe	Kinan Racing Team
Eswatini	Kwanele Jele			
Ethiopia	Filimon Zerabruk Debay		Negasi Haylu Abreha	Vega–Vitalcare–Dynatek
Finland	Axel Källberg	Lucky Sport Cycling Team	Matias Ahtosalo	UN Cycling Team
France	Romain Grégoire	Groupama–FDJ United	Rémi Cavagna	Groupama–FDJ United
Gambia	Sarjo Ceesay			
Germany	Felix Engelhardt	Team Jayco–AlUla	Nils Politt	UAE Team Emirates XRG
Greece	Nikiforos Arvanitou	Team United Shipping	Miltiadis Giannoutsos	
Guatemala	Sergio Chumil	Burgos Burpellet BH	Sergio Chumil	Burgos Burpellet BH
Guyana	Briton John		Marcus Keiler	
Honduras			Christopher Jahir Diaz	4WD Rent a Car–Facatativa
Hong Kong	Ng Pak Hang	HKSI Pro Cycling Team	Chu Tsun Wai	HKSI Pro Cycling Team
Hungary	Zsombor Takács	MBH Bank CSB Telecom Fort	Barnabás Peák	MBH Bank CSB Telecom Fort
Indonesia	Muhammad Andy Royan	Nusantara Cycling Team	Muhammad Andy Royan	Nusantara Cycling Team
Ireland	Seth Dunwoody	Bahrain Victorious Development Team	Ryan Mullen	NSN Cycling Team
Israel	Nadav Raisberg	NSN Cycling Team	Oded Kogut	NSN Cycling Team
Italy	Jonathan Milan	Lidl–Trek	Filippo Ganna	Netcompany INEOS
Japan	Yuhi Todome	Aisan Racing Team	Shunsuke Imamura	Lotto–Groupe Wanty
Jordan	Khaled Samah		Majid Abu Harrah	
Kazakhstan	Nicolas Vinokurov	XDS Astana Team	Yevgeniy Fedorov	XDS Astana Team
Kenya	John Muchiri	Team Amani	Wangai Evan Kimani	
Laos	Ananxay Milakong		Thavone Phonasa	
Latvia	Mārtiņš Pluto	Energus Cycling Team	Kristiāns Belohvoščiks	Bike Aid
Lithuania	Aivaras Mikutis	Tudor Pro Cycling Team	Aivaras Mikutis	Tudor Pro Cycling Team
Luxembourg	Arthur Kluckers	Tudor Pro Cycling Team	Alex Kirsch	Cofidis
Macau	Kam Chin Pok	China Anta–Mentech Cycling Team	Kam Chin Pok	China Anta–Mentech Cycling Team
Mali	Tiémoko Diallo		Yaya Diallo	
Malta	Andrea Mifsud	Team Polti VisitMalta	Andrea Mifsud	Team Polti VisitMalta
Mauritius	Jeremy Raboude		Alexandre Mayer	Burgos Burpellet BH
Moldova	Ilie Șeremet		Ilie Șeremet	
Monaco			Victor Langellotti	Netcompany INEOS
Montenegro	Danilo Luković			
Morocco	Anass Aït El Abdia	Qatar Pro Team	Mohcine El Kouraji	
Namibia	Roger Surén	Alpecin–Premier Tech Development Team	Martin Freyer	
Netherlands	Wilco Kelderman	Visma–Lease a Bike	Huub Artz	Lotto–Intermarché
New Zealand	George Bennett	NSN Cycling Team	Finn Fisher-Black	Red Bull–Bora–Hansgrohe
North Macedonia	Stefan Petrovski	Cycling Team Velo-M Termalift	Bojan Naumovski	
Norway	Anders Skaarseth	Uno-X Mobility	Tobias Foss	Netcompany INEOS
Panama	Carlos Samudio	Solution Tech NIPPO Rali	Carlos Samudio	Solution Tech NIPPO Rali
Peru			Alonso Miguel Gamero	
Philippines	Ronnilan Quita	7 Eleven–Cliqq Roadbike Philippines	Nash Lim	Factor Racing
Poland	Kacper Maciejuk	Voster Team	Michał Kwiatkowski	Netcompany INEOS
Portugal	António Morgado	UAE Team Emirates XRG	António Morgado	UAE Team Emirates XRG
Puerto Rico	Abner González	Feirense–Beeceler		
Romania	Cristian Raileanu	Li-Ning Star	Cristian Raileanu	Li-Ning Star
Saint Lucia	Denver Alphonse		Denver Alphonse	
Serbia	Veljko Stojnić	Team United Shipping	Dušan Rajović	Solution Tech NIPPO Rali
Slovenia	Roman Ermakov	Team Bahrain Victorious	Primož Roglič	Red Bull–Bora–Hansgrohe
Slovakia	Lukáš Kubiš	Unibet Rose Rockets	Lukáš Kubiš	Unibet Rose Rockets
South Africa	Blaine Kieck	UV Aube	Stefan de Bod	Modern Adventure Pro Cycling
South Korea	Kim Eu-ro	LX Cycling Team		
Spain	Marcel Camprubí	Pinarello–Q36.5 Pro Cycling Team	Pablo Castrillo	Movistar Team
Sweden	Hugo Forssell	CK Hymer	Jakob Söderqvist	Lidl–Trek
Switzerland	Jan Christen	UAE Team Emirates XRG	Jan Christen	UAE Team Emirates XRG
Thailand	Athit Poulard	Roojai Insurance Winspace	Athit Poulard	Roojai Insurance Winspace
Turkey	Feritcan Şamlı	Spor Toto Cycling Team	Samet Bulut	Muğla Büyükşehir Belediyesi Spor Kulübü
United Arab Emirates	Mohammad Almutaiwai	UAE Team Emirates Gen Z	Abdulla Jasim Al-Ali	UAE Team Emirates Gen Z
United Kingdom	Fred Wright	Pinarello–Q36.5 Pro Cycling Team	Ethan Hayter	Soudal–Quick-Step
United States	Quinn Simmons	Lidl–Trek	Artem Shmidt	Netcompany INEOS
Uruguay	Diego Leonel Rodríguez		Roderyck Asconeguy	Dolores Cycles Club
Uzbekistan			Nikita Tsvetkov	Bardiani–CSF 7 Saber
Zambia	Gift Puteho			
Zimbabwe	Andrew Chikwaka		Andrew Chikwaka	

==== Champions in UCI Men's teams ====
UCI WorldTeams
Team	Road Race Champions	Time Trial Champions
Alpecin–Premier Tech	Michael Gogl (AUT)	
Decathlon CMA CGM		
EF Education–EasyPost		
Groupama–FDJ United	Romain Grégoire (FRA)	Rémi Cavagna (FRA)
Lidl–Trek	Mathias Vacek (CZE); Jonathan Milan (ITA); Quinn Simmons (USA)	Derek Gee-West (CAN); Mathias Vacek (CZE); Amanuel Ghebreigzabhier (ERI); Jakob Söderqvist (SWE)
Lotto–Intermarché		Huub Artz (NED)
Movistar Team		Pablo Castrillo (ESP)
Netcompany INEOS	Egan Bernal (COL); Victor Langellotti (MON)	Brandon Rivera (COL); Filippo Ganna (ITA); Victor Langellotti (MON); Tobias Foss (NOR); Michał Kwiatkowski (POL); Artem Shmidt (USA)
NSN Cycling Team	Nadav Raisberg (ISR); George Bennett (NZL)	Ryan Mullen (IRL); Oded Kogut (ISR)
Red Bull–Bora–Hansgrohe		Finn Fisher-Black (NZL); Primož Roglič (SLO)
Soudal–Quick-Step		Ethan Hayter (GBR)
Team Bahrain Victorious	Roman Ermakov (SLO)	Alec Segaert (BEL)
Team Jayco–AlUla	Felix Engelhardt (GER)	
Team Picnic–PostNL		
Visma–Lease a Bike	Wilco Kelderman (NED)	
UAE Team Emirates XRG	Rune Herregodts (BEL); António Morgado (POR); Jan Christen (SUI)	Jay Vine (AUS); Felix Großschartner (AUT); Nils Politt (GER); António Morgado (POR); Jan Christen (SUI)
Uno-X Mobility	Magnus Cort (DEN); Anders Skaarseth (NOR)	
XDS Astana Team	Su Haoyu (CHN); Nicolas Vinokurov (KAZ)	Yevgeniy Fedorov (KAZ)

UCI ProTeams
Team	Road Race Champions	Time Trial Champions
Bardiani–CSF 7 Saber	Vicente Rojas (CHL); Nikita Tsvetkov (UZB)	Nikita Tsvetkov (UZB)
Burgos Burpellet BH	Sergio Chumil (GUA)	Sergio Chumil (GUA); Alexandre Mayer (MRI)
Caja Rural–Seguros RGA		
Cofidis		Alex Kirsch (LUX)
Equipo Kern Pharma		
Euskaltel–Euskadi		
MBH Bank CSB Telecom Fort	Zsombor Takács (HUN)	Barnabás Peák (HUN)
Modern Adventure Pro Cycling		Stefan de Bod (RSA)
Pinarello–Q36.5 Pro Cycling Team	Fred Wright (GBR); Marcel Camprubí (ESP)	
Solution Tech NIPPO Rali	Carlos Samudio (PAN)	Carlos Samudio (PAN); Dušan Rajović (SRB)
Team Flanders–Baloise		
Team Novo Nordisk		
Team Polti VisitMalta	Andrea Mifsud (MLT)	Andrea Mifsud (MLT)
Team TotalEnergies		
Tudor Pro Cycling Team	Aivaras Mikutis (LTU); Arthur Kluckers (LUX)	Aivaras Mikutis (LTU)
Unibet Rose Rockets	Lukáš Kubiš (SVK)	Lukáš Kubiš (SVK)

=== Women's Elite ===
Country	Women's Elite Road Race Champion	Road Race Champion's Team	Women's Elite Time Trial Champion	Time Trial Champion's Team
Afghanistan				
Algeria				
Argentina				
Australia	Mackenzie Coupland	Liv AlUla Jayco	Felicity Wilson-Haffenden	Lidl–Trek
Austria	Katharina Sadnik	Visma–Lease a Bike	Christina Schweinberger	Fenix–Premier Tech
Belarus	Anastasiya Kolesava	Canyon//SRAM	Polina Konrad	
Belgium	Shari Bossuyt	AG Insurance–Soudal	Lotte Claes	Fenix–Premier Tech
Belize				
Benin				
Bolivia				
Burkina Faso				
Canada	Maggie Coles-Lyster	Human Powered Health	Nadia Gontova	Liv AlUla Jayco
Chile				
China	Guo Li	Proximus-Cyclis CT	Zhang Hao	Proximus-Cyclis CT
Colombia	Laura Daniela Rojas	Team Sistecredito		
Cuba				
Czech Republic	Julia Kopecký	Team SD Worx–Protime	Julia Kopecký	Team SD Worx–Protime
Denmark	Amalie Dideriksen	Cofidis		
Dominican Republic				
Ecuador	Ana Maria Torres	Best PC Ecuador		
Egypt				
El Salvador				
Eritrea	Suzana Fiseha			
Estonia	Elisabeth Ebras	Lotto–Intermarché Ladies		
Eswatini				
Ethiopia				
Finland	Heidi Antikainen	Minimax Cycling Team	Anniina Ahtosalo	Uno-X Mobility
France	Célia Gery	FDJ United–Suez	Célia Le Mouël	Ma Petite Entreprise
Germany	Franziska Koch	FDJ United–Suez	Franziska Koch	FDJ United–Suez
Greece				
Guatemala				
Hong Kong				
Hungary	Petra Zsankó	Aromitalia Vaiano	Petra Zsankó	Aromitalia Vaiano
India				
Indonesia				
Ireland	Lara Gillespie	UAE Team ADQ	Lara Gillespie	UAE Team ADQ
Iceland	Bríet Kristý Gunnarsdóttir		Hafdís Sigurðardóttir	
Italy	Elisa Longo Borghini	UAE Team ADQ		
Japan	Akari Kobayashi			
Kazakhstan	Rinata Sultanova	UAE Development Team	Rinata Sultanova	UAE Development Team
Latvia	Kitija Siltumēna			
Lesotho				
Lithuania				
Luxembourg	Marie Schreiber	Team SD Worx–Protime		
Malaysia				
Mauritius	Kim Le Court-Pienaar	AG Insurance–Soudal	Kim Le Court-Pienaar	AG Insurance–Soudal
Moldova				
Namibia				
Netherlands	Lieke Nooijen	Visma–Lease a Bike	Daniek Hengeveld	Visma–Lease a Bike
New Zealand	Ally Wollaston	FDJ United–Suez	Ella Wyllie	Liv AlUla Jayco
Norway	Sigrid Ytterhus Haugset	Uno-X Mobility	Katrine Aalerud	Uno-X Mobility
Pakistan				
Panama				
Paraguay				
Peru				
Poland	Dominika Włodarczyk	UAE Team ADQ	Dominika Włodarczyk	UAE Team ADQ
Portugal	Maria Martins	Canyon//SRAM		
Romania	Iana-Alesia Baltes	Rembe / Rad-Net		
Rwanda				
Serbia				
Singapore				
Slovakia	Viktória Chladoňová	Visma–Lease a Bike	Viktória Chladoňová	Visma–Lease a Bike
Slovenia	Nika Bobnar	Nexetis	Nika Bobnar	Nexetis
South Africa	Tyler Jacobs		Ashleigh Moolman Pasio	AG Insurance–Soudal
South Korea				
Spain	Mireia Benito	AG Insurance–Soudal	Mireia Benito	AG Insurance–Soudal
Sweden			Mika Söderström	
Switzerland	Steffi Häberlin	Team SD Worx–Protime	Jasmin Liechti	Nexetis
Taiwan				
Thailand				
Turkey				
Uganda				
Ukraine	Yuliia Biriukova	Laboral Kutxa–Fundación Euskadi		
United Arab Emirates				
United Kingdom	Zoe Bäckstedt	Canyon//SRAM	Zoe Bäckstedt	Canyon//SRAM
United States	Kate Courtney		Taylor Knibb	
Uruguay				
Uzbekistan				
Venezuela				
Zimbabwe				
