= Rotem Tene =

Israeli cyclist (born 2001)

Rotem Tene רותם טנא
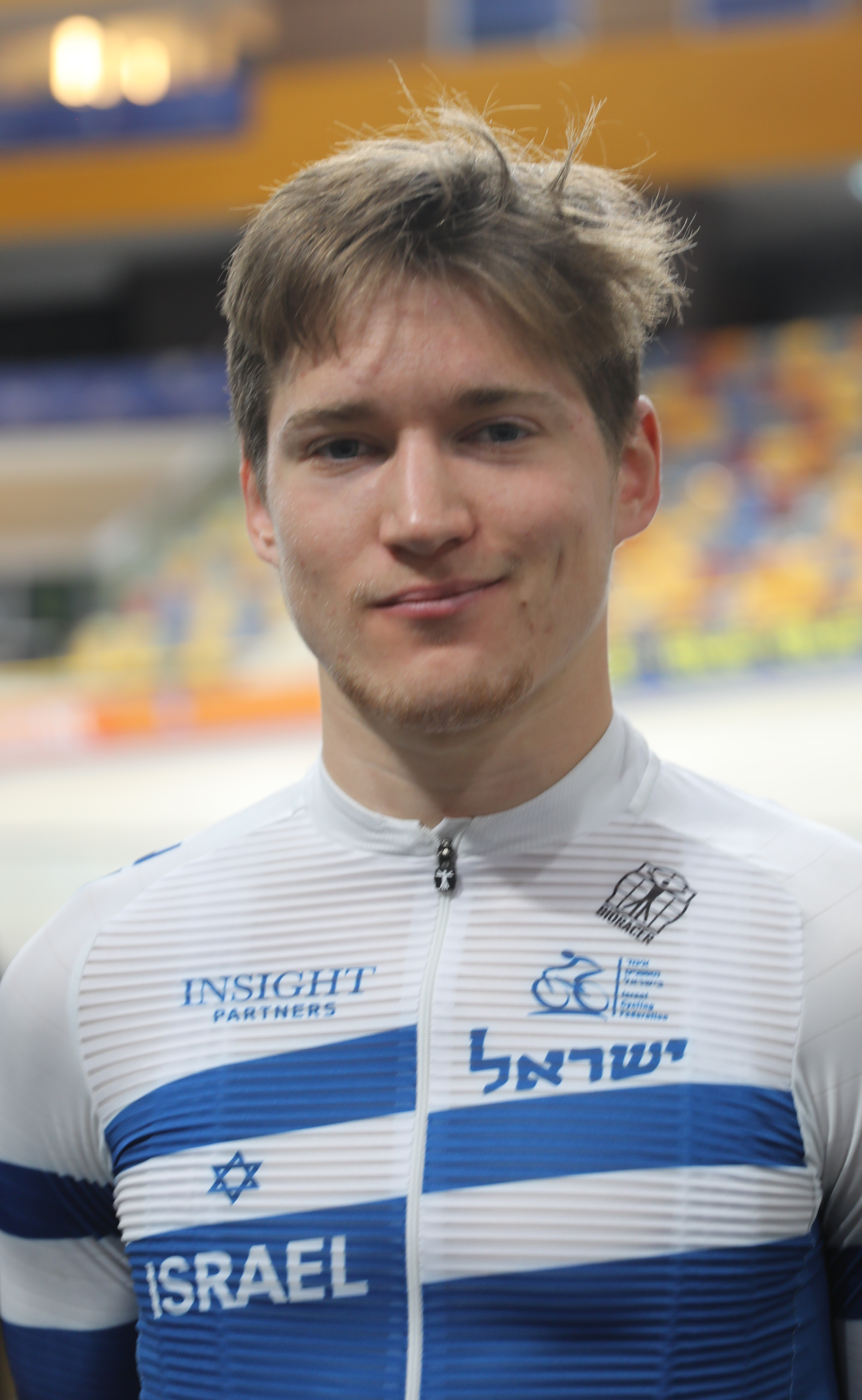
- Tene in 2024

Personal information
- Born: 30 March 2001 (age 25) Hod Hasharon, Israel
- Height: 1.8 m (5 ft 11 in)
- Weight: 72 kg (159 lb)

Cycling career
- Sport: Cycling
- Current team: NSN Cycling Team
- Disciplines: Road; Track
- Role: Rider

Amateur teams
- 2019: Crabbe Toitures–CC Chevigny
- 2020: Israel Go Pro
- 2021: GSC Blagnac Velo Sport 31

Professional teams
- 2021–2026: Israel Cycling Academy
- 2026–: NSN Cycling Team

Rotem Tene (Hebrew: רותם טנא; born 30 March 2001) is an Israeli road and track cyclist, who currently rides for UCI WorldTeam NSN Cycling Team. He placed fifth in the elimination race at the 2022 UCI Track Cycling World Championships.

== Major results ==
=== Road ===
2018
3rd Time trial, National Junior Road Championships
7th Overall Tour des Portes du Pays d'Othe
2021
2nd Road race, National Under-23 Road Championships
2022
5th Road race, National Road Championships
5th Grand Prix Nasielsk-Serock
6th Grand Prix Criquielion
10th Paris–Tours Espoirs
2023
5th Road race, National Road Championships
2024
3rd Road race, National Road Championships
9th Grote Prijs Stad Halle
2025 (1 pro win)
1st Stage 8 Volta a Portugal
2nd Memoriał Andrzeja Trochanowskiego
4th Omloop der Kempen

=== Track ===
2020
3rd Scratch, National Championships
2022
National Championships

1st Omnium
2nd Elimination race
3rd Points race
