= Omer Shapira =

Israeli cyclist (born 1994)

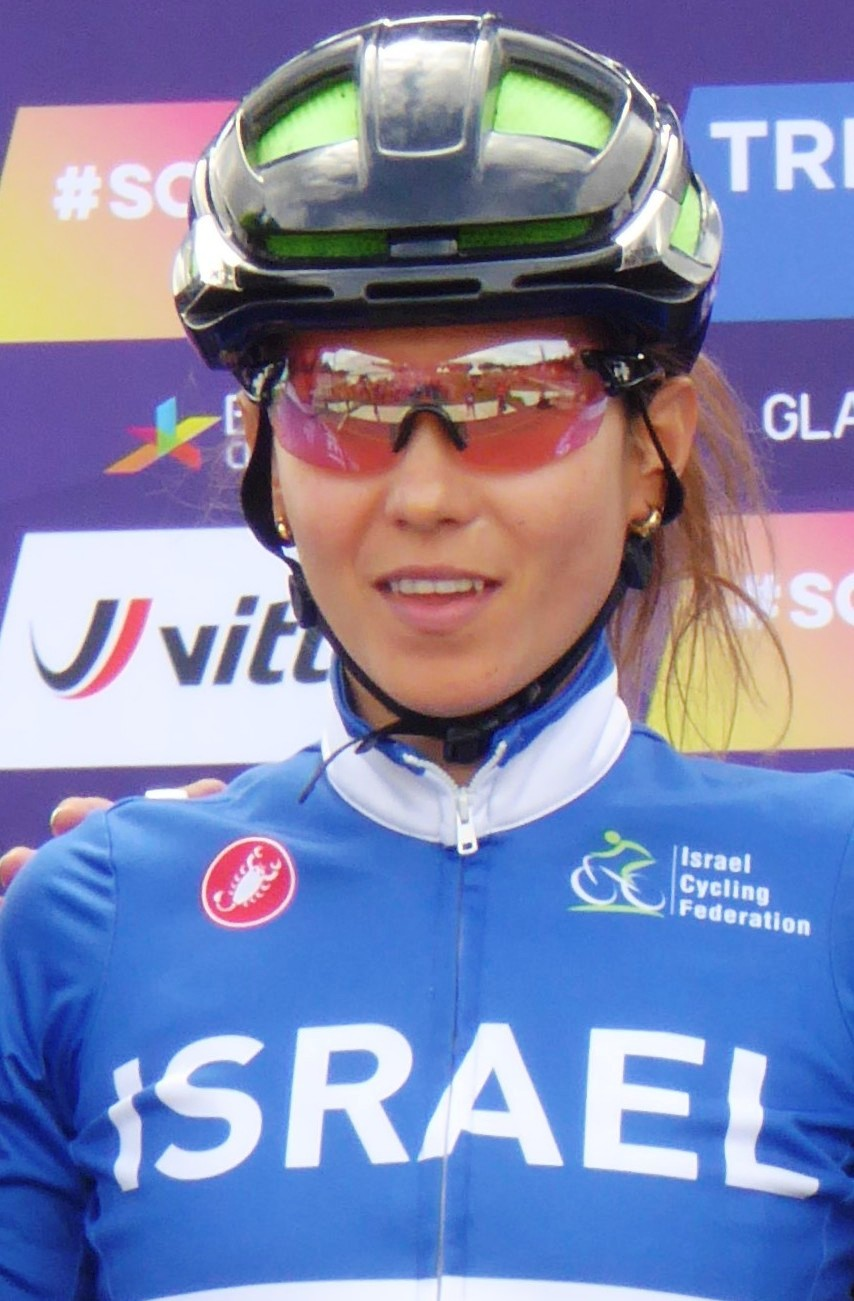
- Shapira at the 2018 European Road Cycling Championships

Personal information
- Full name: Omer Shapira; Hebrew: עומר שפירא
- Born: 9 September 1994 (age 32)
- Height: 1.66 m (5 ft 5 in)
- Weight: 58 kg (128 lb)

Cycling career
- Sport: Cycling
- Current team: Retired
- Disciplines: Road; Mountain biking
- Role: Rider

Professional teams
- 2017: Giusfredi–Bianchi
- 2018: Cylance Pro Cycling
- 2019–2021: Canyon//SRAM
- 2022–2023: EF Education–Tibco–SVB
- 2024: Doltcini O'Shea

Major wins
- One-day races and Classics National Road Race Championships (2017–2022) National Time Trial Championships (2020, 2022)

Omer Shapira (Hebrew: עומר שפירא; born 9 September 1994) is an Israeli former professional racing cyclist. She is an eight-time national road champion; winning the Israeli National Time Trial Championships in 2020 and 2022, and the Israeli National Road Race Championships for six consecutive years between 2017 and 2022.

== Career ==
Shapira rode in the women's time trial event at the 2018 UCI Road World Championships.

=== Canyon–SRAM (2019–21) ===
For the 2019 season, Shapira joined the Canyon//SRAM team.

In March, she came in second at the Scorpions' Pass Time Trial and third at the Aphrodite Cycling Race Individual Time Trial, and in August, she came in third overall at the Colorado Classic. In September, Shapira finished 13th of 53 cyclists in the 30.3-kilometre (18.8-mile) time trial at the UCI Road World Championships in Great Britain.

In doing so, she guaranteed Israel a place at the women's time trial contest in the 2020 Summer Olympics. Ultimately delayed to 2021 due to the COVID-19 pandemic, Shapira represented Israel in both the time trial and the road race. In the road race, Shapira was in a pack at the front for most of the race only to be overhauled by the chasing pack in the final moments; she finished in 24th place. In the time trial, Shapira finished in 15th place.

=== EF Education–Tibco–SVB ===
After three seasons with Canyon//SRAM, Shapira moved to the EF Education–Tibco–SVB team for the 2022 season. In her first season with the team, she won both Israeli national road championship titles – her second in the time trial, and her sixth consecutive title in the road race.

== Personal life ==
Shapira grew up in moshav Ein HaBesor, Israel. She is in a relationship with Israeli cyclist Guy Sagiv. They reside in Girona, Spain.

== Major results ==
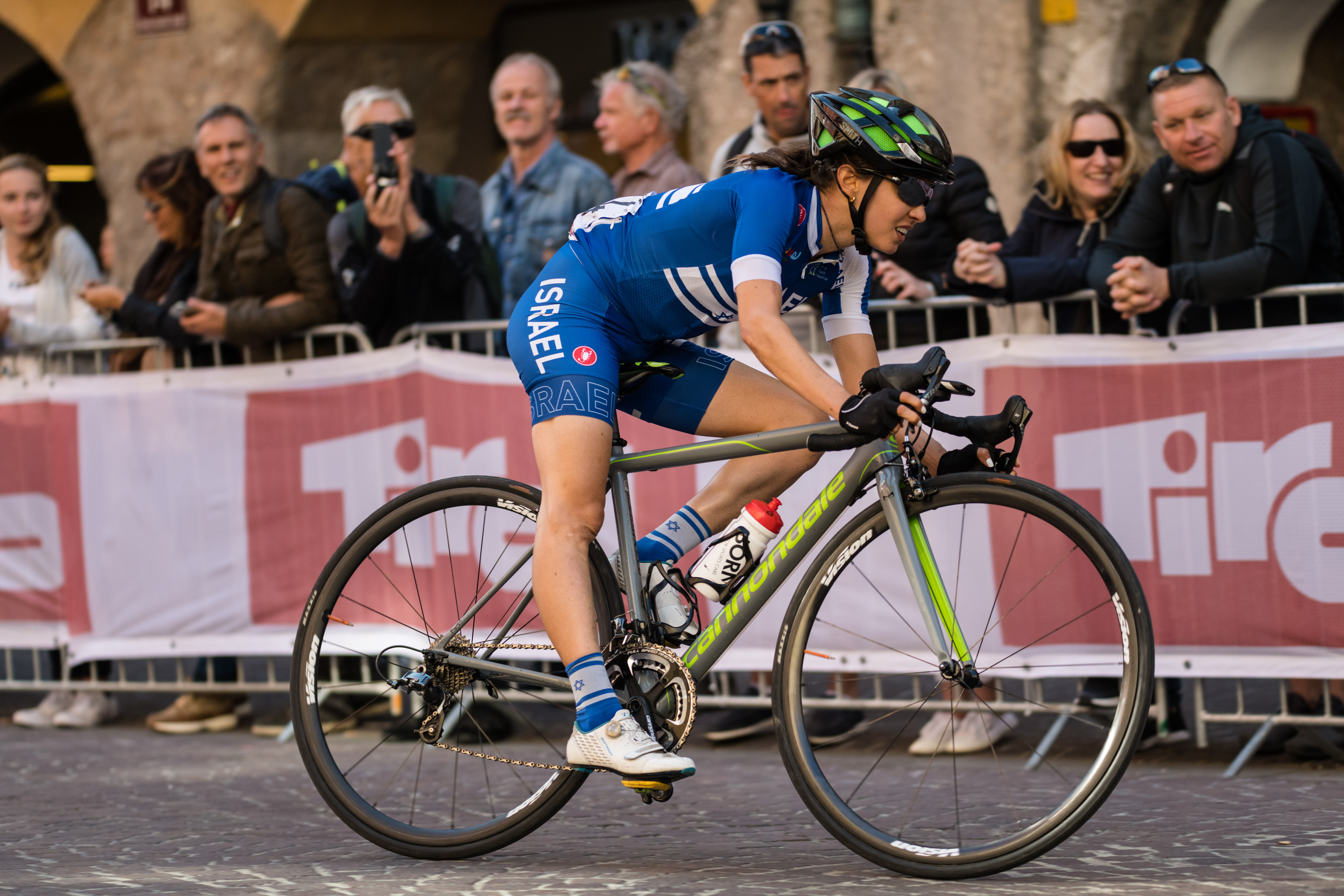
Shapira at the 2018 UCI Road World Championships

2014
3rd Road race, National Road Championships
2015
2nd Road race, National Road Championships
2016
National Road Championships

3rd Time trial
3rd Road race

4th Massada–Arad
4th Arad–Dimona–Arad
4th Dead Sea–Scorpion Pass
2017
1st Road race, National Road Championships
8th Giro del Trentino Alto Adige-Südtirol
2018
National Road Championships

1st Road race
2nd Time trial

7th Overall Gracia–Orlová
10th Overall Tour of Eftalia Hotels & Velo Alanya
2019
1st Road race, National Road Championships
1st Stage 1 (TTT) Giro Rosa
2nd Scorpions' Pass Time Trial
3rd Overall Colorado Classic
3rd Aphrodite Cycling Race Individual Time Trial
4th Tour of Arava
5th Aphrodite's Sanctuary Cycling Race
8th Overall Tour of California
9th Overall Giro della Toscana Int. Femminile – Memorial Michela Fanini
2020
National Road Championships

1st Road race
1st Time trial

1st Cross-country marathon, National Mountain Bike Championships
2021
1st Road race, National Road Championships
10th Overall Setmana Ciclista Valenciana
10th Overall Giro della Toscana Int. Femminile – Memorial Michela Fanini
2022
National Road Championships

1st Road race
1st Time trial
