= Yoav Bear =

Israeli cyclist

Yoav Bear יואב בר
Personal information
- Born: June 24, 1991 (age 35) Haifa, Israel

Cycling career
- Sport: Cycling
- Discipline: Road
- Role: Rider

Amateur team
- 2013–2014: Autronic–CC Vigués

Professional team
- 2015: Cycling Academy

Yoav Bear (Hebrew: יואב בר; born June 24, 1991, in Haifa) is an Israeli former professional cyclist.

== Major results ==
2011
National Road Championships

1st Under-23 road race
1st Under-23 time trial
2nd Road race
2nd Time trial

1st Overall Apple Race

1st Stages 1 & 2

2013
National Road Championships

1st Time trial
1st Under-23 time trial

1st Overall Tour of Arad

1st Stages 1, 2b (TTT) & 3

2014
1st Time trial, National Road Championships
1st Stage 2b (TTT) Tour of Arad
3rd Overall Apple Race
2015
1st Time trial, National Road Championships
2nd Overall Tour of Arad

1st Stage 2b (TTT)

2016
3rd Time trial, National Road Championships
