= Leah Goldstein =

Israeli road racing cyclist

Leah Goldstein לאה גולדשטיין
Personal information
- Full name: Leah Goldstein
- Born: February 4, 1969 (age 57) Vancouver, British Columbia, Canada

Cycling career
- Sport: Cycling
- Discipline: Road
- Role: Rider

Major wins
- 1st in World Bantamweight Kickboxing Championship (1989); 1st in Israeli Duathlon Championship (1998); 1st in National Championship, Road, ITT, Elite, Israel (F) (2007–09); 1st in National Championship, Road, Elite, Israel (F) (2007–09); 1st in General Classification Tour of the Gila (F) (USA) (2008); 1st Solo Woman – Race Across America (RAAM) (USA) (2011–12); 1st Overall Solo Division RAAM (USA) (2021)

Leah Goldstein (Hebrew: לאה גולדשטיין; born February 4, 1969, in Vancouver, British Columbia, Canada) is a professional Canadian-Israeli road racing cyclist, former 1989 World Bantamweight Kickboxing Champion, and Israel's 1998 Duathlon champion. In 2021, she became the first woman to win the overall solo division of the Race Across America (RAAM).

== Early and personal life ==
Born in Vancouver, Canada, to Israeli parents, Goldstein was raised in Israel after her family immigrated there. At the age of 17 she won the Bantamweight World Kickboxing Championship. She spent 9 years in the Israeli commandos and secret police. She returned to Canada in the late 1990s. Goldstein lives in Vernon, British Columbia.

== Career ==
=== Kickboxing ===
A natural athlete, at 17 years of age Goldstein won the 1989 World Bantamweight Kickboxing Championship.

=== Duathlon ===
Goldstein was Israel's 1998 duathlon (run-bike-run) champion. Shortly before the 2004 Olympics, she broke her hand in a race in Pennsylvania. And then in 2005, after winning 9 of her first 11 races she was involved in a horrific crash during the Cascade Classic that almost ended her career. She was hospitalized for two and a half months and told she would never walk without a cane.

=== Cycling ===
In 2008 Goldstein won the Israeli national women's road cycling championships in both time trials and road racing. In 2009 she repeated as national champion in both events.

In 2011, Goldstein won the women's solo category of Race Across America (RAAM). In 2019, she came in second in the women's division and fifth overall in RAAM. In June 2021, she won the overall solo division for this 3,000 mile race in 11 days, three hours. and three minutes.

== Book ==
Goldstein wrote a book about her life entitled No Limits; The Powerful True Story of Leah Goldstein-World Champion Kickboxer, Ultra Endurance Cyclist, Israeli Undercover Police Officer (2016).

== Speaker ==
In February 2024, Goldstein became the topic of controversy when she was removed from her spot as keynote speaker at an Ottawa International Women’s Day event, after she had accepted an invitation, as a result of her time in the IDF. She said: "I am zero political when I speak. Honestly, there is nothing political about my presentation. I just talk about the crap that I went through and the crap that most women go through, and they still do, and how I handled it." Goldstein noted: "As a Jewish woman, I would never be offended if a Palestinian woman were to speak about her obstacles and life journey. I thought that’s what women were supposed to do for each other – listen and support!” Deborah Lyons, Canada’s former ambassador to Israel and the Liberal-appointed special envoy on Holocaust remembrance and combating antisemitism, called it “just another example of the erasure and silencing of Jews going on across Canada and around the world."

== Results ==
=== 1989 ===
- 1st Inaugural Kfar Maccabiah Biathlon, Israel

=== 1998 ===
- 1st Israeli Duathalon Championships

=== 1999 ===
- 1st BC Road Championships
- 1st Women’s Tour de France – Domestique

=== 2000 ===
- 3rd in National Championship, Road, ITT, Elite, Canada (F) (CAN)

=== 2001 ===
- 3rd in National Championship, Road, ITT, Elite, Canada (F) (CAN)

=== 2002 ===
- 2nd in Stage 1 Tour de Toona (F) (USA)
- 2nd in National Championship, Road, ITT, Elite, Canada (F) (CAN)

=== 2003 ===
- 3rd in Stage 1 Tour of the Gila (F) (USA)

=== 2005 ===
- 1st in Stage 2 Mount Hood Classic (F) (USA)
- 3rd in Stage 4 Mount Hood Classic (F) (USA)
- 1st in Stage 3 Mount Hood Classic (F) (USA)
- 1st in Stage 5 Mount Hood Classic (F) (USA)
- 1st in General Classification Mount Hood Classic (F) (USA)

=== 2006 ===
- 2nd in Stage 4 Mount Hood Classic (F) (USA)
- 3rd in Stage 6 Mount Hood Classic (F) (USA)
- 1st in General Classification Mount Hood Classic (F) (USA)

=== 2007 ===
- 1st in Stage 4 Mount Hood Classic (F) (USA)
- 2nd in Stage 5 Mount Hood Classic (F) (USA)
- 1st in General Classification Mount Hood Classic (F) (USA)
- 1st in National Championship, Road, ITT, Elite, Israel (F) (ISR)
- 1st in National Championship, Road, Elite, Israel (F) (ISR)
- 2nd in Tour de Gastown (F) (CAN)
- 2nd in Stage 3 Tour de Delta (F) (CAN)
- 2nd in General Classification Tour de Delta (F) (CAN)

=== 2008 ===
- 3rd in Stage 1 San Dimas Stage Race (F), Glendora (USA)
- 1st in Stage 1 Tour of the Gila (F), Mogollon R.R. (USA)
- 2nd in Stage 3 Tour of the Gila (F) (USA)
- 1st in General Classification Tour of the Gila (F) (USA)
- 1st in Stage 4 Mount Hood Classic (F) (USA)
- 3rd in General Classification Mount Hood Classic (F) (USA)
- 1st in National Championship, Road, ITT, Elite, Israel (F) (ISR)
- 1st in National Championship, Road, Elite, Israel (F) (ISR)

=== 2009 ===
- 1st in National Championship, Road, ITT, Elite, Israel (F) (ISR)
- 1st in National Championship, Road, Elite, Israel (F) (ISR)

=== 2010 ===
- 1st Solo Woman (2nd overall) – Race Across Oregon
- 1st Solo Woman + new record 2nd overall – Ring of Fire

=== 2011 ===
- 1st Solo Woman – Race Across America (RAAM) – Best Overall Female, Best in Age Group, Queen of the Mountains, Queen of the Prairies, and Rookie of the year.

=== 2012 ===
- 1st Solo Woman (2nd overall) RAW – New time record

=== 2019 ===
- 2nd Solo Division and 5th overall RAAM – Queen of the Prairies

=== 2021 ===
- 1st Overall Solo Division RAAM – 1st woman in 39-yr history to win Overall Solo Division – Queen of the Mountains – Queen of the Prairies

=== 2022 ===
- 1st Overall Hoodoo 500 – Broke previous record
- 1st Solo Women RAW (Race Across the West) – New women’s time record

=== 2023 ===
- 2nd Women’s Solo RAAM (Race Across America) 4th Overall in 10 days 8 hours – Broke personal record by 10 hours – Queen of the Mountains – Queen of the Prairies
