= Niv Libner =

Niv Libner ניב ליבנר
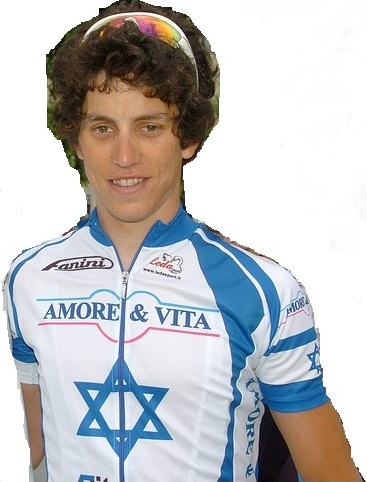

Personal information
- Born: 11 January 1987 (age 39) Tel Aviv, Israel
- Height: 1.76 m (5 ft 9 1/2 in)
- Weight: 61 kg (134 lb)

Cycling career
- Sport: Cycling
- Discipline: Road
- Role: Rider

Professional team
- 2011–2014: Amore & Vita

Major wins
- National Road Race Championships (2010, 2011, 2014); National Junior Road Race Championships (2005)

Niv Libner (Hebrew: ניב ליבנר; born 11 January 1987) is an Israeli former professional cyclist, who last rode for the Amore & Vita–Selle SMP team. Born in Tel Aviv, Libner started bicycling at the age of 11, and in 2005 won the Israeli National Junior Road Race Championships and in 2010, the Israeli National Road Race Championships. In 2011 he was the third ever Israeli to join a Pro Cycling Team, by joining Amore & Vita.

== Major results ==
2005
National Junior Road Championships

1st Road race
2nd Time trial

2006
1st Volvo Challenge XC Marton Race
2nd Harish Road Race
2nd XC Marton of Mitzpe-Ramon
2008
1st Overall Tour d'Arad

1st Stages 1 (TTT) & 2

1st Neot Qedumim
1st Harish Road Race
1st Qiriat–Shmona–Yehodia
2009
1st Overall Apple Tour

1st Stages 1, 2 (ITT) & 3

1st Magenim Forst
1st Harish Race
Maccabiah Games

3rd Road race
6th Individual time trial

3rd Road race, National Road Championships
2010
1st Road race, National Road Championships
1st Overall Tour de Israel (with Ran Margaliot)

1st Stages 1, 2, 3 & 4

2011
National Road Championships

1st Road race
3rd Time trial

2013
2nd Hets Hatsafon
2014
1st Road race, National Road Championships
3rd Hets Hatsafon
