= Shani Bloch =

Israeli cyclist (born 1979)

Shani Bloch שני בלוך
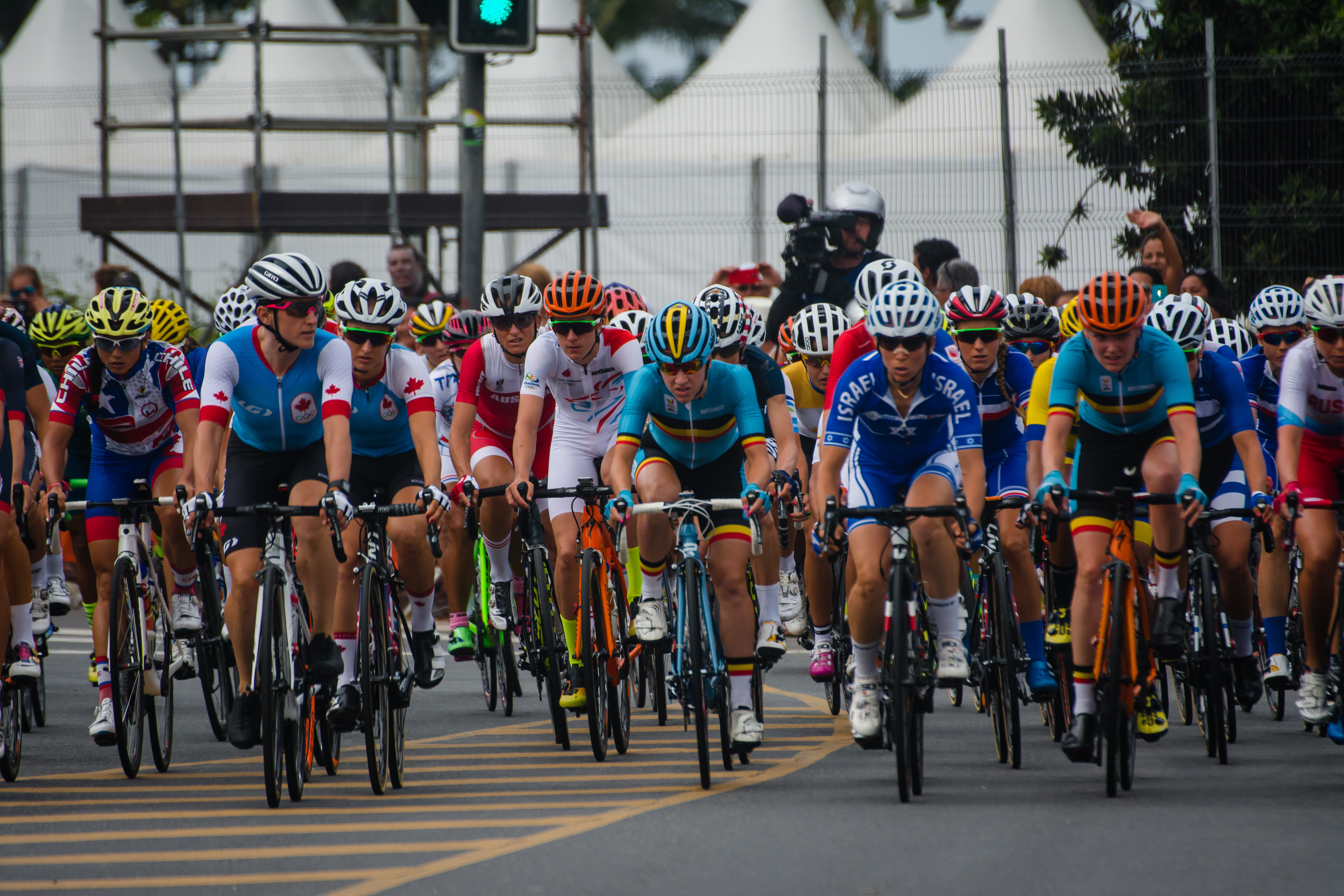
- Shani Bloch (center right) at the 2016 Olympic road race

Personal information
- Full name: Shani Bloch-Davidov
- Born: 6 March 1979 (age 47) Israel
- Height: 162 cm (5 ft 4 in)
- Weight: 59 kg (130 lb)

Cycling career
- Sport: Cycling
- Current team: Team VéloCONCEPT Women
- Role: Rider and Sport Director

Shani Bloch (Hebrew: שני בלוך) also known as Shani Bloch-Davidov (Hebrew: שני בלוך-דוידוב; born 6 March 1979) is an Israeli racing cyclist.

Bloch is the first Israeli road cyclist to compete in the Grande Boucle Féminine Internationale, Giro d'Italia Femminile, and Road World Championships, and the first Israeli road cyclist to compete in the Olympic Games since 1960. After taking off a decade to raise a family, at the age of 37 she represented Israel at the 2016 Summer Olympics in the 141 kilometer (87.6 mile) Women's Road Race in Rio de Janeiro.

== Personal life ==
Bloch is from Kiryat Bialik in the Haifa District in Israel. She served as a combat fitness instructor for Sayeret Matkal in the Israel Defense Forces. She then studied and obtained a B.A. at the Wingate Institute.

Bloch and her husband, project manager and university professor Shai Davidov, have three daughters, Noga and twins Rotem and Amit.

== Bicycle racing career ==
=== Early years ===
Bloch is the first Israeli road cyclist to compete in the Grande Boucle Féminine Internationale, Giro d'Italia Femminile, and UCI Road World Championships, and the first Israeli road cyclist to compete in the Olympic Games since 1960. She is a four-time Israeli Road Champion.

Bloch began riding with the Israeli Megiddo Regional Council team, with Yair Ben-Ami as her trainer. Her coaches in 2016 were Zahi Boignon and Ilan Ulman.

She was the Israeli cross-country high school champion in 1994–96.

She placed high in the under-23 category of the 2000 Giro d'Italia Femminile stage race in Italy, and competed in it again in 2001 and 2003.

In 2002, she came in 63rd in the 128k World Championships Women's Road Race in Hasselt-Zolder, Belgium. That same year, Bloch finished in 18th place (3rd place in the under-25s) in the Grande Boucle Féminine Internationale (the women's Tour de France), riding for the Italian team Michela Fanini. She was the first Israeli woman to ride in the competition. In 2003, she came in 39th in the 124k World Championships Women's Road Race in Hamilton, Canada. The following year she rode with the team Equipe Cycliste Rona.

=== Comeback ===
Bloch retired in 2004 to start a family. She competed in the 2013 Maccabiah Games, winning a silver medal in the women's triathlon. She began competing again in cycling in 2014, after suddenly feeling a desire to return to the competition and adrenaline that attends cycling.

In 2014, she won silver medals in both the Israel National Championships Women's Road Race and in the Israel National Championships Time Trials, both behind Israeli Paz Bash. She rode at the 2014 UCI Road World Championships, in and around Ponferrada, Spain. She did not finish, along with dozens of other riders who fell victim to a series of crashes, including a mass crash.

In March 2016 Bloch won the Masada-Arad race in 52:01, came in second in the Dead Sea-Scorpion Pass race, eight seconds behind the 2:30:05 winning time of Antri Christoforou of Cyprus, and came in third in the Arad-Dimona-Arad race, behind Christoforou and Bash. In April 2016 she won the Crit on The Campus criterium around Stirling University in Stirling, Scotland, ahead of Charline Joiner of Scotland. In June 2016 she finished second at the Scottish Road Race Championship (behind British National Circuit Race Champion Eileen Roe of Scotland), second at the Israeli Championships Women's Time Trial, and fourth at the Israeli Championships Women's Road Race.

In the summer of 2016, she was ranked 88th in the world in the Union Cycliste Internationale (UCI) world rankings, which qualified her to compete in the 2016 Olympics.

Bloch represented Israel at the 2016 Summer Olympics in the Women's Road Race in Rio de Janeiro, two years after returning to competition. At the age of 37, she was the oldest member among the 47 athletes on Team Israel. She finished the 141 kilometer (87.6 mile) road race in a time of 4:02.59, in 48th place among 68 riders. She was the first Israeli of either gender to compete as a cyclist at the Olympic Games since Henry Ohayon and Itzhak Ben David in 1960 in Rome.
