= Scorpions' Pass Time Trial =

Race details
- Date: March
- Region: Israel
- Discipline: Road
- Competition: UCI 1.2 (2016, 2019–)
- Type: Time Trial

History
- First edition: 2016
- Editions: 2 (as of 2019)
- First winner: Shani Bloch (ISR)
- Most wins: No repeat winners
- Most recent: Antri Christoforou (CYP)

The Scorpions' Pass Time Trial is an annual professional road bicycle race for women in Israel.

== Winners ==
Year	Country	Rider	Team
2016	Israel	Shani Bloch	
2019	Cyprus	Antri Christoforou	Cogeas–Mettler

== See also ==
- Scorpions' Pass
