= Paz Bash =

Israeli cyclist

Paz Bash פז בש
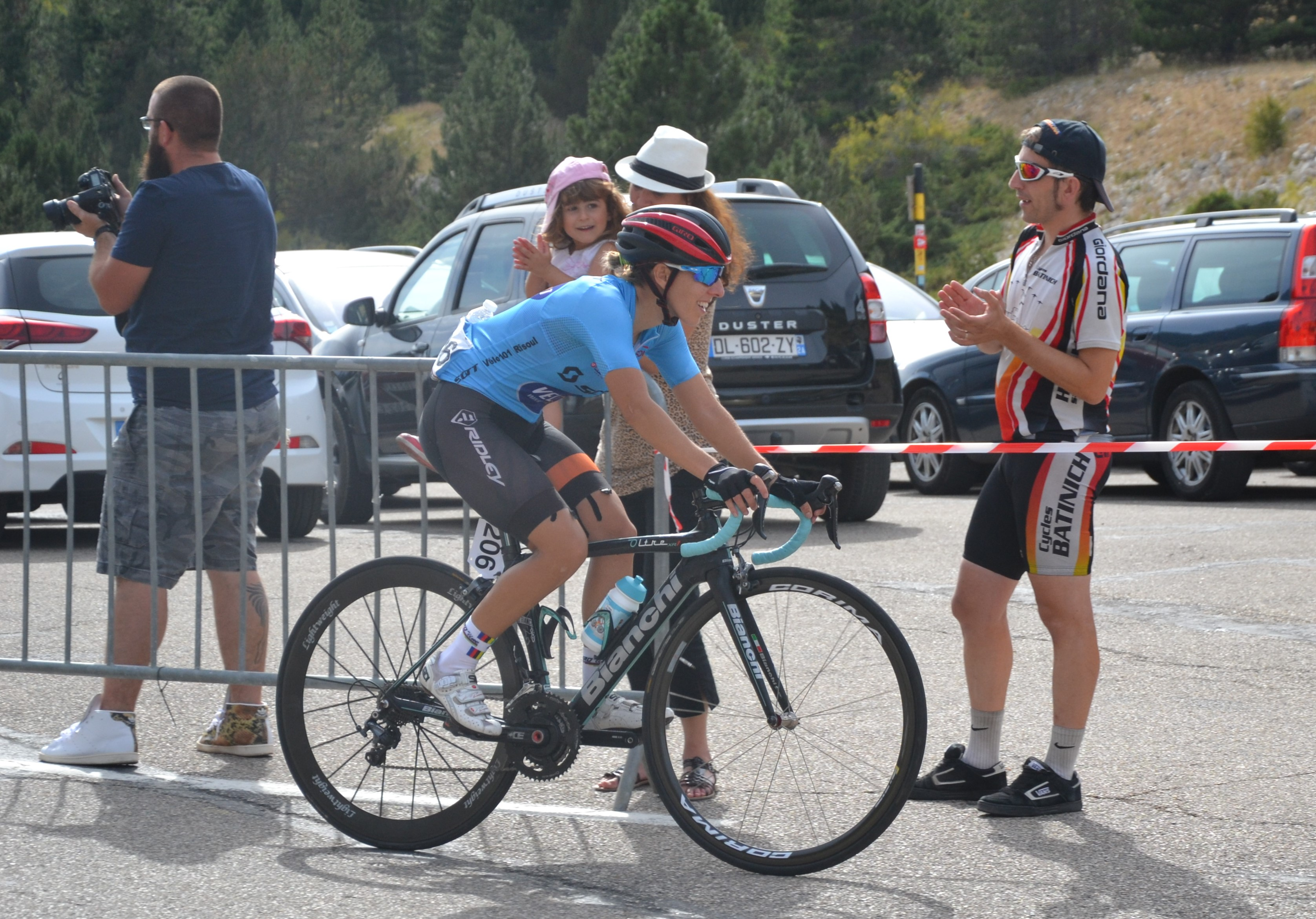
- Bash in 2016

Personal information
- Born: 28 June 1983 (age 43) Israel

Cycling career
- Sport: Cycling
- Disciplines: Road; Mountain biking
- Role: Rider

Amateur team
- 2016: Autoglas Wetteren

Major wins
- One day races National Time Trial Championships (2012–2016) National Road Race Championships (2013–2014)

Paz Bash (Hebrew: פז בש; born 28 June 1983) is an Israeli racing cyclist. She competed in the 2013 UCI women's road race in Florence.

== Major results ==
2011
3rd Road race, National Road Championships
2012
1st Time trial, National Road Championships
2013
National Road Championships

1st Time trial
1st Road race

2014
National Road Championships

1st Time trial
1st Road race

1st Cross-country, National Mountain Bike Championships
2015
National Road Championships

1st Time trial
3rd Road race

1st Gilboa Mountainbike
2016
1st Time trial, National Road Championships
2017
National Road Championships

2nd Road race
3rd Time trial

2018
National Road Championships

3rd Time trial
3rd Road race

2019
National Road Championships

2nd Time trial
3rd Road race

10th Tour of Arava
