= Oded Kogut =

Israeli cyclist (born 2001)

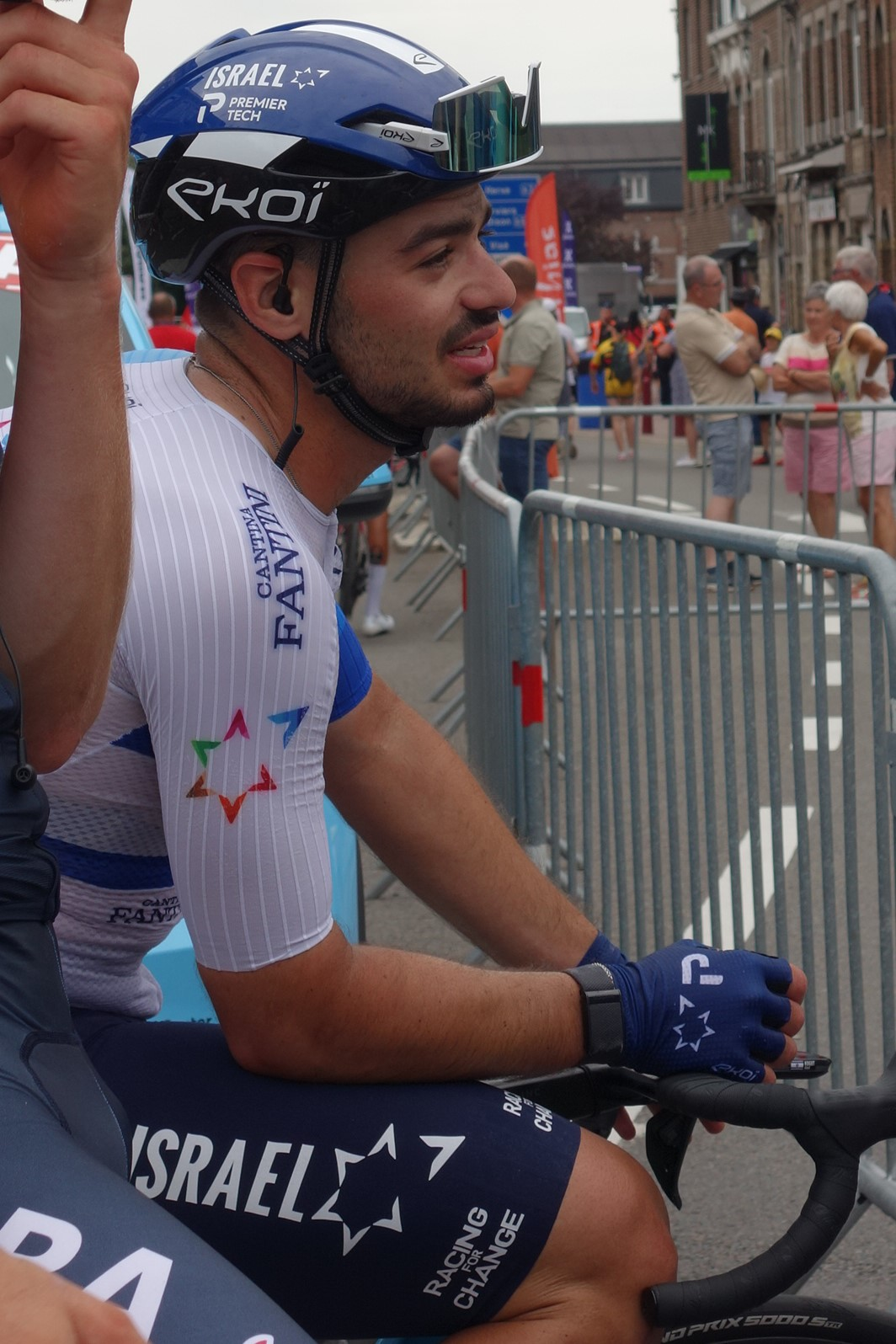
- Oded Kogut in 2024

Personal information
- Born: 14 February 2001 (age 25) Israel
- Height: 1.71 m (5 ft 7 in)
- Weight: 77 kg (170 lb)

Cycling career
- Sport: Cycling
- Current team: NSN Cycling Team
- Discipline: Road
- Role: Rider
- Rider type: Sprinter

Amateur teams
- 2019: Isorex
- 2020: Club 500 Watt

Professional teams
- 2021–2023: Israel Cycling Academy
- 2024–: Israel–Premier Tech

Major wins
- One-day races and Classics National Road Race Championships (2024) National Time Trial Championships (2023, 2024)

Oded Kogut (Hebrew: עודד קוגוט; born 14 February 2001) is an Israeli road cyclist, who currently rides for UCI ProTeam NSN Cycling Team.

== Career ==
As an under-23 rider Kogut won the national time trial and road race championships.

Kogut joined UCI ProTeam NSN Cycling Team in 2024 on a two-year contract.

== Major results ==
2019
1st Time trial, National Junior Road Championships
2021
National Under-23 Road Championships

1st Road race
1st Time trial

2022
Dookoła Mazowsza

1st Stages 2 & 3

2nd Time trial, National Road Championships
8th Youngster Coast Challenge
2023 (1 pro win)
National Road Championships

1st Time trial
4th Road race

1st Overall Dookoła Mazowsza

1st Points classification
1st Young rider classification
1st Stages 1, 2 & 3

1st Points classification, Istrian Spring Trophy
6th Umag Trophy
6th Puchar MON
2024 (3)
National Road Championships

1st Road race
1st Time trial

1st Stage 6 CRO Race
2nd Ronde van Overijssel
3rd Antwerp Port Epic
7th Elfstedenronde
2025 (2)
1st Gooikse Pijl
1st Stage 6 CRO Race
3rd Road race, National Road Championships
4th Elfstedenronde
