= Aviv Yechezkel =

Israeli cyclist

Aviv Yechezkel אביב יחזקאל
Personal information
- Born: 21 April 1994 (age 32) Metzer, Israel

Cycling career
- Sport: Cycling
- Discipline: Road
- Role: Rider

Amateur teams
- 2015: CCC
- 2015–2016: Asfra Racing Oudenaarde

Professional team
- 2016–2018: Cycling Academy

Aviv Yechezkel (Hebrew: אביב יחזקאל; born 21 April 1994 in Metzer) is an Israeli former cyclist, who rode professionally for the Israel Cycling Academy team between 2016 and 2018.

== Major results ==
2012
1st Time trial, National Junior Road Championships
2014
4th Time trial, National Road Championships
2015
2nd Time trial, National Road Championships
2016
National Road Championships

1st Time trial
2nd Road race

1st National Cyclo-cross Championships
2017
3rd Road race, National Road Championships
