= Itamar Einhorn =

Israeli cyclist (born 1997)

Itamar Einhorn איתמר איינהורן
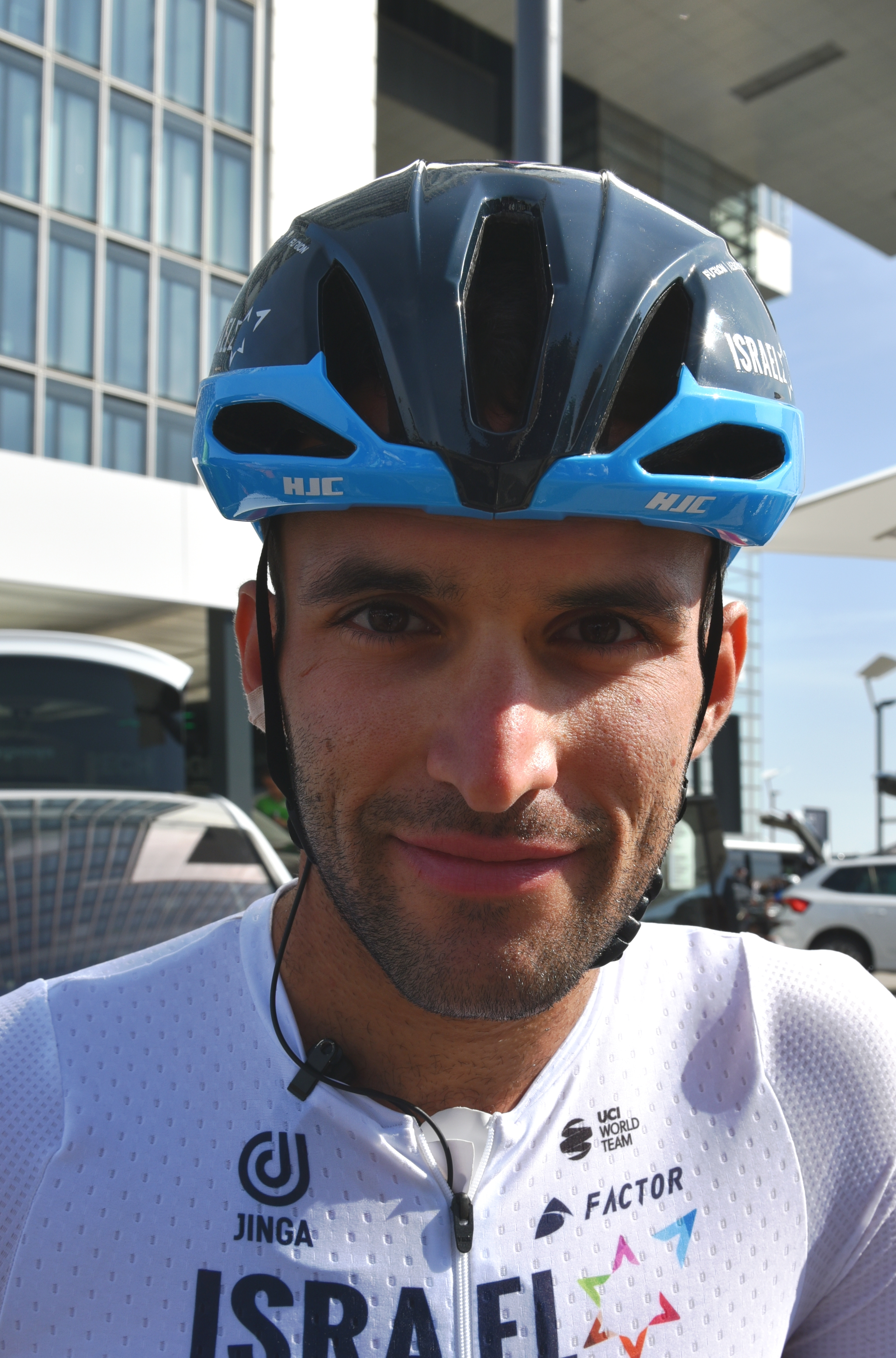
- Itamar Einhorn (2022)

Personal information
- Born: 20 September 1997 (age 29) Modi'in, Israel
- Height: 1.72 m (5 ft 8 in)
- Weight: 72 kg (159 lb)

Cycling career
- Sport: Cycling
- Current team: NSN Cycling Team
- Discipline: Road bicycle racing
- Role: Rider
- Rider type: Sprinter

Amateur teams
- 2016: Vérandas Willems–Crabbe–CC Chevigny
- 2017–2018: Israel Cycling Academy Development

Professional teams
- 2017: Israel Cycling Academy (stagiaire)
- 2018: Israel Cycling Academy (stagiaire)
- 2019–: Israel Cycling Academy

Major wins
- Single-day races and Classics Israeli National Road Race Championships (2022, 2023)

Itamar Einhorn (Hebrew: איתמר איינהורן; born 20 September 1997) is an Israeli cyclist, who currently rides for UCI ProTeam NSN Cycling Team. In 2022 and 2023, he won the Israeli National Road Race Championships. Einhorn represented Israel at the 2024 Paris Olympics in cycling in the Men's individual road race at Pont d'Iéna.

== Early and personal life ==
Einhorn was born in Modi'in, Israel. He is 1.72 m (5 ft 8 in) tall, and weighs 72 kg (159 lb). He speaks both Hebrew and English. Asked whether he enjoys cycling despite the demands and difficulties of the sport, he said: "I'm living the dream.... I am fulfilling my childhood dream."

== Cycling career ==
=== Early years ===
Einhorn followed his brother Ben, four years older than he is and himself a fourth-place finisher in the 2013 Israeli National Championships, into cycling. He first rode mountain bikes, and then switched to road racing in 2013. In 2014, he won the junior Israeli national championship in road racing, in Hadera, Israel.

From 2017 to 2019 he rode for Israel Premier Tech Academy. He currently rides for UCI ProTeam NSN Cycling Team.

In the 2020 edition of Tour Colombia Einhorn finished 3rd on stage 2 becoming the first Israeli to finish on the podium in a UCI sanctioned race.

In the 2021 edition of the Okolo Slovenska in Slovakia, Einhorn won stage 4 becoming the first Israeli to ever win a UCI Europe Tour stage.

=== 2022–23; National championships ===
In August 2022, Einhorn came in 13th out of 141 cyclists in the 2022 European Road Championships – Men's road race in Munich, Germany.

In 2022 and 2023, Einhorn won the Israeli National Road Race Championships.

On October 9, 2023, two days after the 2023 Hamas-led attack on Israel, Einhorn came in second in the last stage of the 2023 Tour of Hainan. He said: "I’ve never felt like this before. Of course, I wanted to win. But I didn’t feel anything. There was neither the sting of missing the victory nor a trace of satisfaction from finishing second. The utter sense of triviality weighed heavily on me, knowing that while I raced thousands of kilometers away, my homeland was engulfed in a horrific act of terror and slaughter."

=== 2024–present; Olympic Games ===
In 2024 through May, Einhorn had four wins in the Tour du Rwanda and the Tour de Taiwan, matching his total for all of 2023, and in his career had won 13 UCI races.

==== 2024 Summer Olympics ====
Einhorn represented Israel at the 2024 Paris Olympics in cycling in the Men's individual road race at Pont d'Iéna, and came in 62nd. The race consisted of a challenging 270-kilometer hilly course, with a very small peloton of approximately 85 riders. He said: "For me, representing Israel in the Olympics is a message of a nation aspiring for peace."

== Major results ==
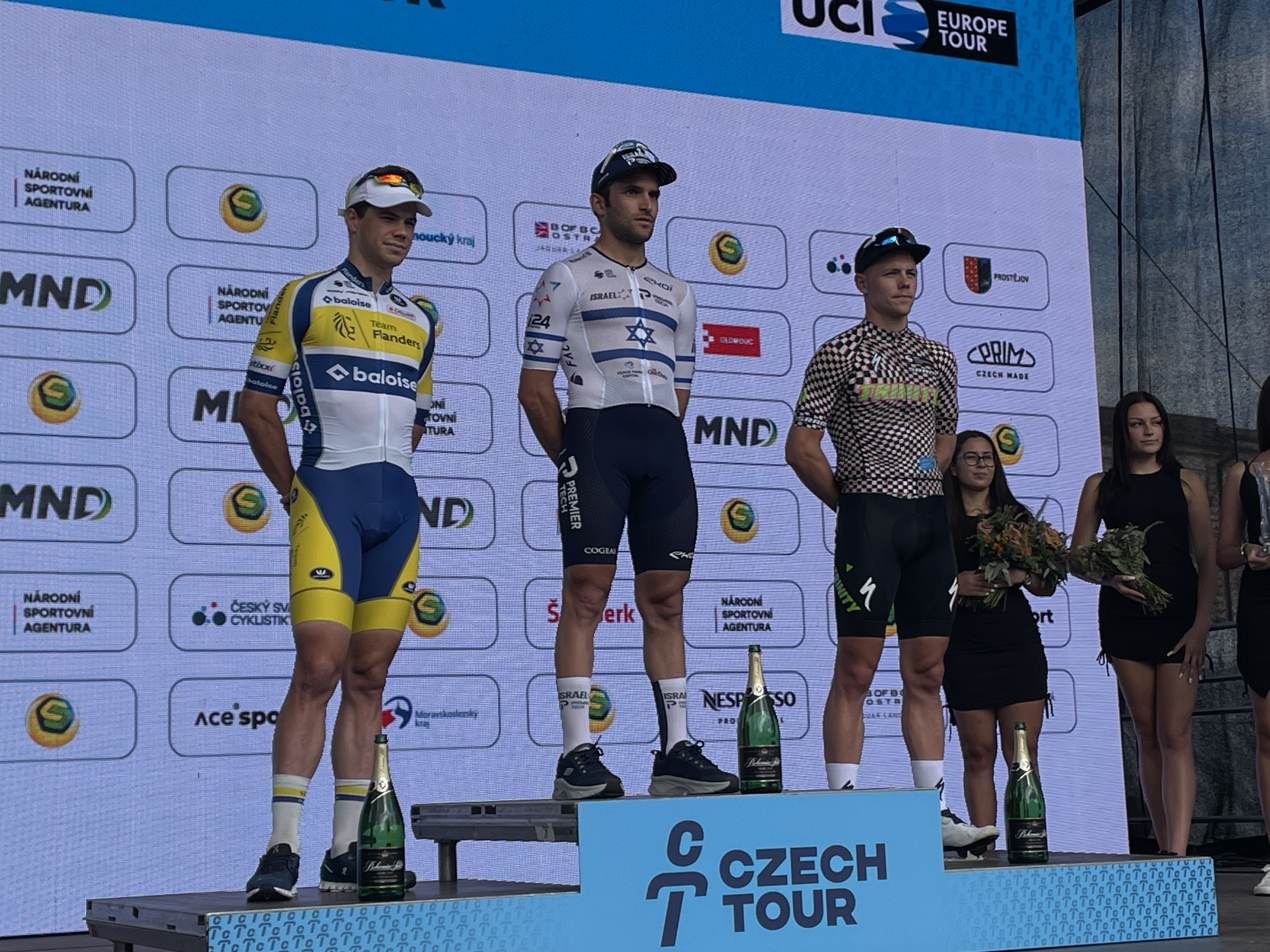
1st on stage podium after Stage 1, 2023 Czech Tour, Uničov

2014
National Junior Road Championships

1st Time trial
3rd Road race

2017
2nd Road race, National Road Championships
2020
3rd Overall Course de Solidarność et des Champions Olympiques

1st Stage 1

9th Scheldeprijs
2021 (1 pro win)
1st GP Polski
1st Stage 4 Okolo Slovenska
3rd Road race, National Road Championships
2022 (1)
1st Road race, National Road Championships
1st Grand Prix Wyszków
3rd GP Polski
4th Münsterland Giro
9th Grand Prix Nasielsk-Serock
10th Puchar MON
2023 (2)
1st Road race, National Road Championships
1st GP Polski
1st Memoriał Andrzeja Trochanowskiego
1st Stage 1 Czech Tour
4th Milano–Torino
9th Scheldeprijs
9th Grote Prijs Jean-Pierre Monseré
9th Kampioenschap van Vlaanderen
2024 (4)
Tour du Rwanda

1st Stages 2 & 7

Tour de Taiwan

1st Stages 1 & 5

6th Veenendaal–Veenendaal
8th Elfstedenronde
2025 (1)
1st Stage 4 Tour de Taiwan
3rd Rund um Köln
2026 (2)
Tour du Rwanda

1st Stages 1 & 6

8th Kampioenschap van Vlaanderen

=== Grand Tour general classification results timeline ===
Grand Tour	2021
Giro d'Italia	—
Tour de France	—
Vuelta a España	DNF

Legend
—	Did not compete
DNF	Did not finish

== See also ==
- Henry Ohayon, Israeli Olympic individual road race cyclist
- Itzhak Ben David, Israeli Olympic individual road race cyclist
