= Omer Goldstein =

Israeli cyclist

Omer Goldstein עומר גולדשטיין
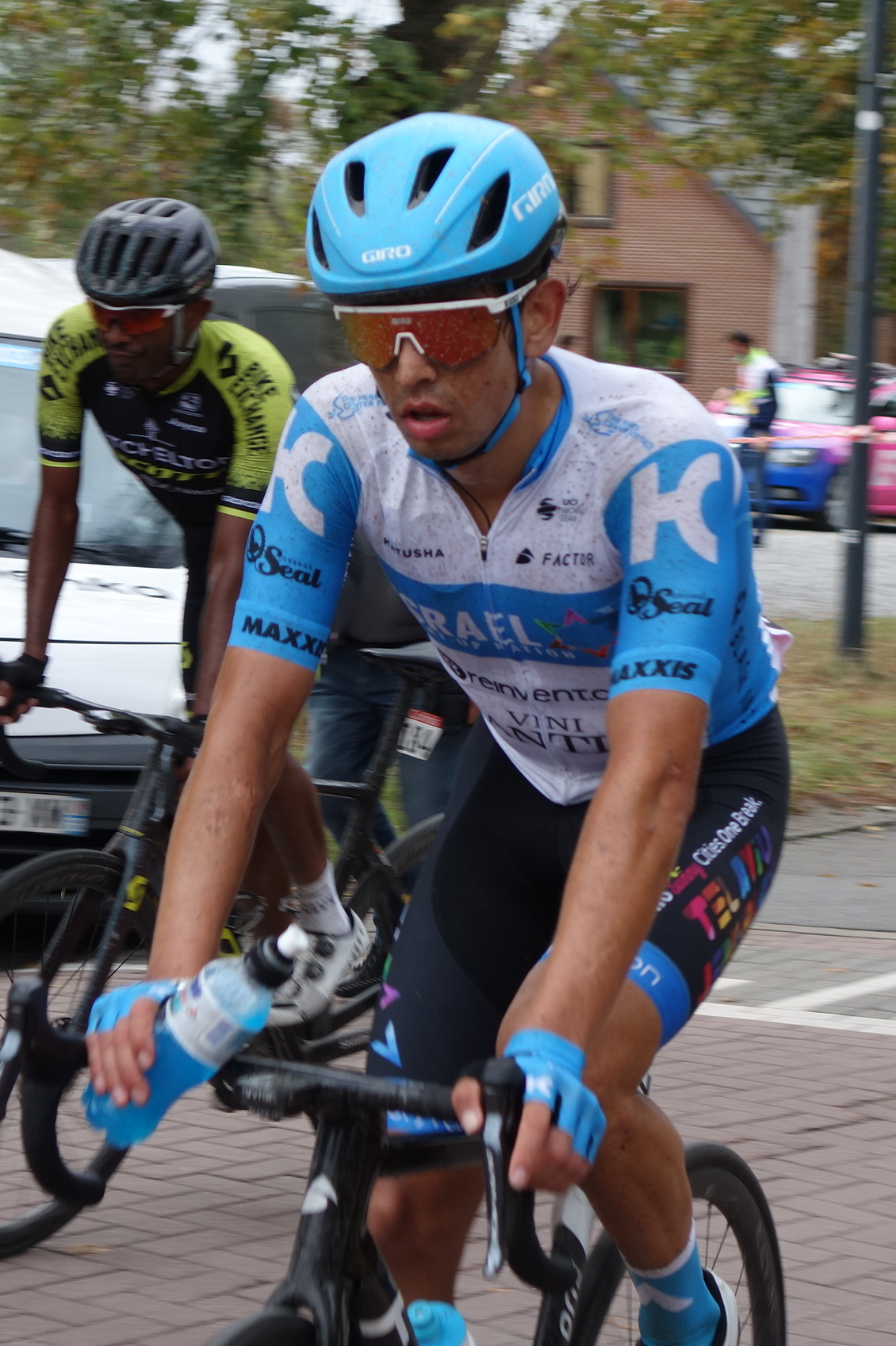
- Omer Goldstein at the 2020 La Flèche Wallonne

Personal information
- Born: 13 August 1996 (age 30) Misgav, Israel
- Height: 1.74 m (5 ft 9 in)
- Weight: 61 kg (134 lb)

Cycling career
- Sport: Cycling
- Discipline: Road
- Role: Rider

Amateur teams
- 2015–2016: Dynamo Racing
- 2017: Israel Cycling Academy
- 2017: Ampo–Goierriko TB

Professional teams
- 2016: Cycling Academy
- 2018–2023: Israel Cycling Academy

Major wins
- Single-day races and Classics National Time Trial Championships (2018, 2021, 2022) National Road Race Championships (2020)

Omer Goldstein (Hebrew: עומר גולדשטיין; born 13 August 1996 in Misgav) is an Israeli cyclist, who most recently rode for UCI ProTeam Israel–Premier Tech. His brother Roy Goldstein also competed professionally as a cyclist. In October 2020, he was named in the startlist for the 2020 Vuelta a España.

== Major results ==
2013
1st Road race, National Junior Road Championships
2015
National Road Championships

2nd Under-23 time trial
3rd Time trial
4th Road race

2016
National Road Championships

2nd Time trial
2nd Under-23 time trial

2017
2nd Time trial, National Road Championships
2018
National Road Championships

1st Time trial
3rd Road race

2019
2nd Road race, National Road Championships
2020
1st Road race, National Road Championships
2021
1st Time trial, National Road Championships
2022
National Road Championships

1st Time trial
3rd Road race

9th Overall Tour de Wallonie
2023
2nd Time trial, National Road Championships

=== Grand Tour general classification results timeline ===
Grand Tour	2020	2021	2022
Giro d'Italia	—	—	—
Tour de France	—	122	—
Vuelta a España	106	—	62

Legend
—	Did not compete
DNF	Did not finish
IP	In progress
