= Rotem Gafinovitz =

Israeli cyclist (born 1992)

Rotem Gafinovitz רותם גפינוביץ
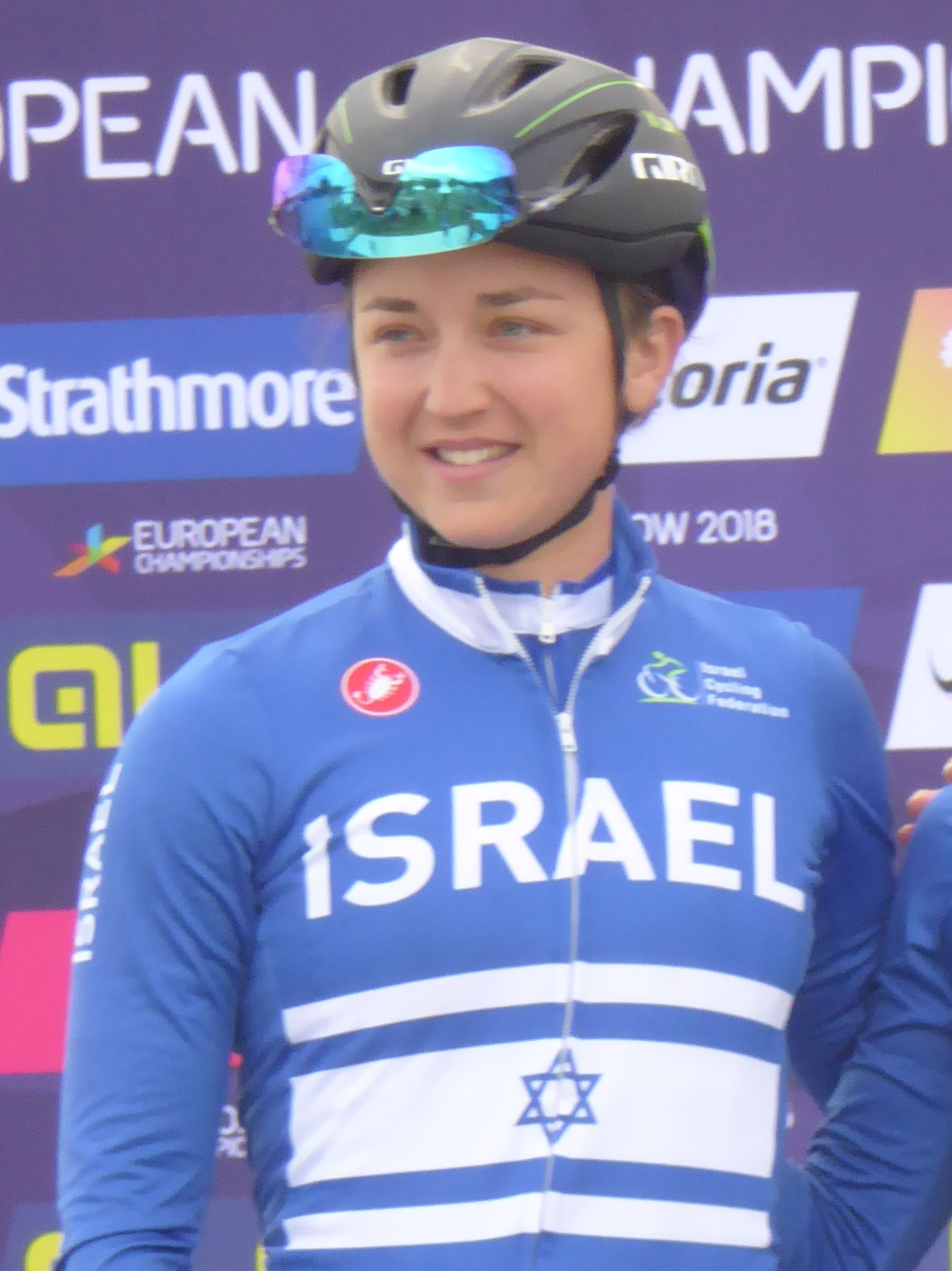
- Gafinovitz at the 2018 European Road Cycling Championships.

Personal information
- Full name: Rotem Gafinovitz; Hebrew: רותם גפינוביץ'
- Born: 9 June 1992 (age 34) Modi'in-Maccabim-Re'ut, Israel
- Height: 1.63 m (5 ft 4 in)
- Weight: 52 kg (115 lb)

Cycling career
- Sport: Cycling
- Current team: Hess Cycling Team
- Discipline: Road
- Role: Rider

Amateur teams
- 2011: Dura–Vermeer Cycling Team
- 2016: Jos Feron Lady Force

Professional teams
- 2013: Topsport Vlaanderen–Bioracer
- 2017–2018: WM3 Energie
- 2019–2020: Canyon//SRAM
- 2021: InstaFund Racing
- 2021: Bingoal Casino–Chevalmeire
- 2022: Roland Cogeas Edelweiss Squad
- 2023–present: Hess Cycling Team

Major wins
- Single-day races and Classics National Time Trial Championships (2018, 2019, 2021, 2023)

Rotem Gafinovitz (Hebrew: רותם גפינוביץ'; born 9 June 1992) is an Israeli road cyclist, who rides for Hess Cycling Team. She participated at the 2012 UCI Road World Championships. Through May 2024, she had won six UCI races in her career, and had won the Israeli national time trial championships in road cycling four times. Gafinovitz represented Israel at the 2024 Paris Olympics in cycling in the Women's individual road race.

== Early and personal life ==
Gafinovitz was born in Modi'in-Maccabim-Re'ut, Israel. She is 1.63 meters (5 ft 4 in) tall, and weighs 52 kilograms (115 lb).

== Cycling career ==
Gafinovitz rides for Hess Cycling Team.

=== 2015–23 ===
Gafinovitz won the gold medal in the Israeli National Road Race Championships in 2015, and won the Israeli National Time Trial Championships in 2018, 2019, 2021, and 2023.

In September 2016, Gafinovitz was announced as part of the WM3 Energie squad for 2017.

Gafinovitz won the Tour of Arava in 2019. That year she was also sixth in the GC Gracia–Orlová. At the 2019 European Games in Minsk, Belarus, she came in 9th in the Women's road time trial, and at the 2022 European Road Championships in Munich, Germany, she came in 18th in the Women's time trial.

Gafinovitz was 2nd in the Regiónom Nitrianskeho Kraja in Slovakia in 2023. She was 3rd in the GP of the Mayor of the city Žiar nad Hronom in Slovakia in 2023.

=== 2024–present ===
Through May 2024, Gafinovitz had won six UCI races in her career.

==== 2024 Summer Olympics ====
Gafinovitz represented Israel at the 2024 Paris Olympics in cycling in the Women's individual 158 kilometer road race. She said:

The Olympic Games have been my dream since I was 17, and this ticket to it is the proof for me that even if it takes time, one has to go on and not give up. This is true in sports, and it is doubly true in the current struggle for the return of the abducted in Gaza.

Gafinovitz cycled ahead of the pack for much of the early part of the race, but she was later caught by the peloton and fell to 77th place out of 93 riders where she finished, with a time of 4:13:42.

== Major results ==
=== Road ===
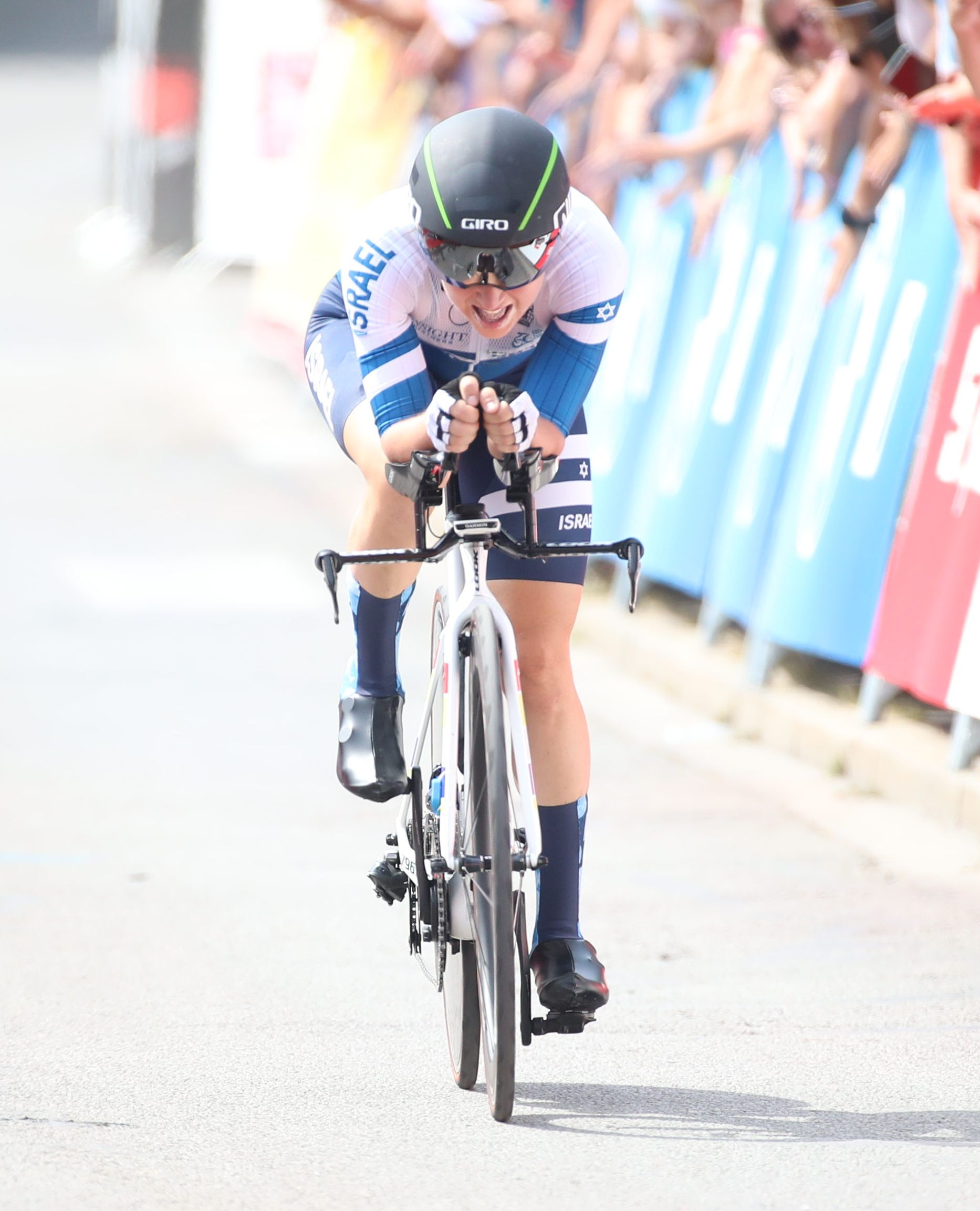
Gafinovitz competing in the 2022 European Championships – Road Cycling Women's Time Trial

2010
National Junior Road Championships

2nd Road race
2nd Time trial

2011
3rd Time trial, National Road Championships
2012
National Road Championships

2nd Road race
2nd Time trial

2013
National Road Championships

2nd Road race
2nd Time trial

2015
National Road Championships

1st Road race
2nd Time trial

2016
2nd Road race, National Road Championships
2017
2nd Time trial, National Road Championships
2018
National Road Championships

1st Time trial
2nd Road race

2019
National Road Championships

1st Time trial
2nd Road race

1st Tour of Arava
6th Overall Gracia–Orlová
9th Time trial, European Games
2021
National Road Championships

1st Time trial
2nd Road race

2022
National Road Championships

2nd Time trial
3rd Road race

=== Mountain biking ===
2014
2nd Cross-country, National Mountain Bike Championships
2nd Salamina Mountain bike
3rd Ma'alot Mountain bike
3rd Malmédy Mountain bike
2015
National Mountain Bike Championships

1st Cross-country
3rd Marathon

1st Ein HaShofet Mountain bike
1st Mishmar Ha'Emeq Mountain bike
1st Kiryat-Ata Mountain bike
2nd Mishmar Ha'Emeq Mountain bike
2nd Haifa Mountain bike (a)
3rd Haifa Mountain bike (b)
