= Itzhak Ben David =

Israeli cyclist

Itzhak Ben David יצחק בן דוד
Personal information
- Born: 1931 Morocco
- Died: 1 June 2007 (aged 75–76)

Cycling career
- Sport: Cycling

Itzhak Ben David (Hebrew: יצחק בן דוד; 1931 – 1 June 2007) was an Israeli cyclist. He competed in the individual road race at the 1960 Summer Olympics.

== See also ==
- Itamar Einhorn, Israeli road race cyclist
- Henry Ohayon, Israeli Olympic individual road race cyclist
