= Guy Sagiv =

Israeli cyclist

Guy Sagiv גיא שגיב
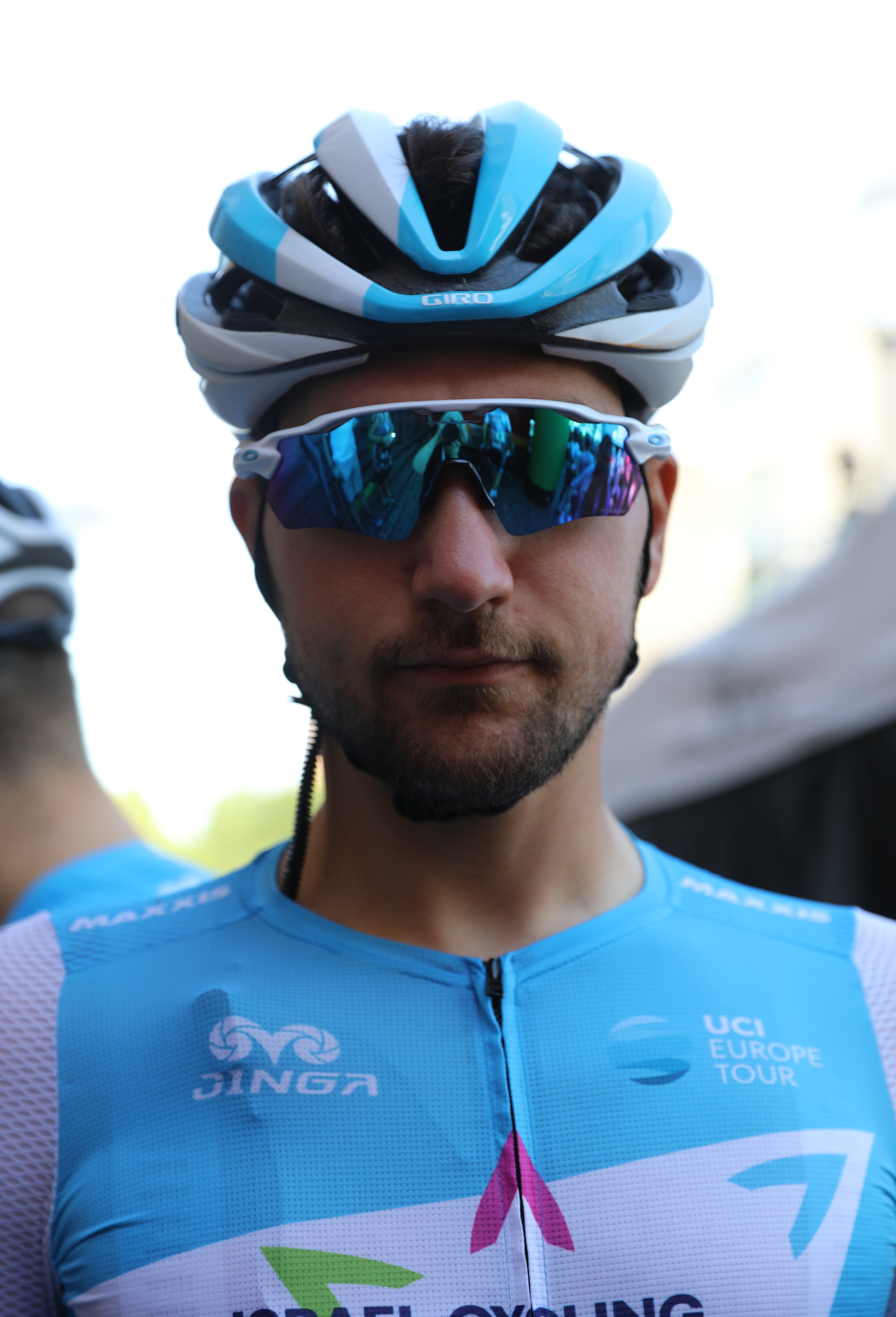
- Sagiv in 2019

Personal information
- Born: 5 December 1994 (age 31) Namur, Belgium
- Height: 1.79 m (5 ft 10 in)
- Weight: 68 kg (150 lb)

Cycling career
- Sport: Cycling
- Discipline: Road
- Role: Rider

Amateur team
- 2012–2015: CCC

Professional team
- 2015–2024: Cycling Academy

Major wins
- Single-day races and Classics National Time Trial Championships (2017, 2020) National Road Race Championships (2015, 2016, 2019)

Guy Sagiv (Hebrew: גיא שגיב; born 5 December 1994) is an Israeli former cyclist, who competed as a professional for UCI ProTeam Israel–Premier Tech from 2015 to 2024. In May 2018, he was named in the startlist for the Giro d'Italia.

== Personal life ==
He is in a relationship with Israeli cyclist Omer Shapira.

== Major results ==
2015
1st Road race, National Road Championships
1st Road race, National Under-23 Road Championships
2016
1st Road race, National Road Championships
1st Road race, National Under-23 Road Championships
2017
1st Time trial, National Road Championships
2018
2nd Road race, National Road Championships
2019
1st Road race, National Road Championships
2020
National Road Championships

1st Time trial
3rd Road race

2021
3rd Time trial, National Road Championships
2022
2nd Road race, National Road Championships
2023
2nd Road race, National Road Championships

=== Grand Tour general classification results timeline ===
Grand Tour	2018	2019	2020
Giro d'Italia	141	—	132
Tour de France	—	—	—
Vuelta a España	—	—	—

Legend
—	Did not compete
DNF	Did not finish
