= Guy Niv =

Israeli cyclist

Guy Niv גיא ניב
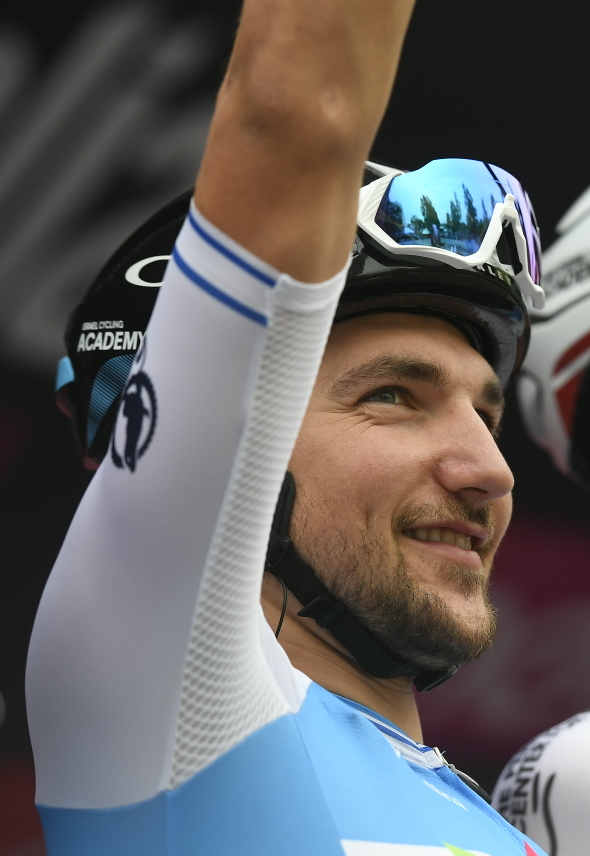
- Niv at 2018 Giro d'Italia

Personal information
- Full name: Guy Niv
- Born: 8 March 1994 (age 32) Misgav, Israel
- Height: 1.68 m (5 ft 6 in)
- Weight: 58 kg (128 lb)

Cycling career
- Sport: Cycling
- Discipline: Road
- Role: Rider

Amateur teams
- 2016: Dynamo Palmira–Weltour
- 2017: Cycling Academy Development
- 2017: Israel Cycling Academy (stagiaire)

Professional team
- 2018–2022: Israel Cycling Academy

Major wins
- Single-day races and Classics National Time Trial Championships (2019)

Guy Niv (Hebrew: גיא ניב; born 8 March 1994 in Misgav) is an Israeli former cyclist, who competed as a professional for UCI WorldTeam Israel–Premier Tech from 2018 to 2022. In 2019, he completed the Giro d'Italia, finishing in 113th place. In August 2020, he became the first Israeli national to race in the Tour de France.

In September 2022, he announced his retirement from the sport, citing a loss of motivation and desire to compete.

== Major results ==
2019
National Road Championships

1st Time trial
3rd Road race

6th Overall Tour de Taiwan
7th Overall GP Beiras e Serra da Estrela
2020
2nd Time trial, National Road Championships
2021
1st Stage 1b (TTT) Settimana Internazionale di Coppi e Bartali

=== Grand Tour general classification results timeline ===
Grand Tour	2018	2019	2020	2021	2022
Giro d'Italia	DNF	113	—	74	—
Tour de France	—	—	139	—	77
Vuelta a España	—	—	—	93	—

Legend
—	Did not compete
DNF	Did not finish
