= Nadav Raisberg =

Israeli cyclist (born 2001)

Nadav Raisberg נדב רייסברג
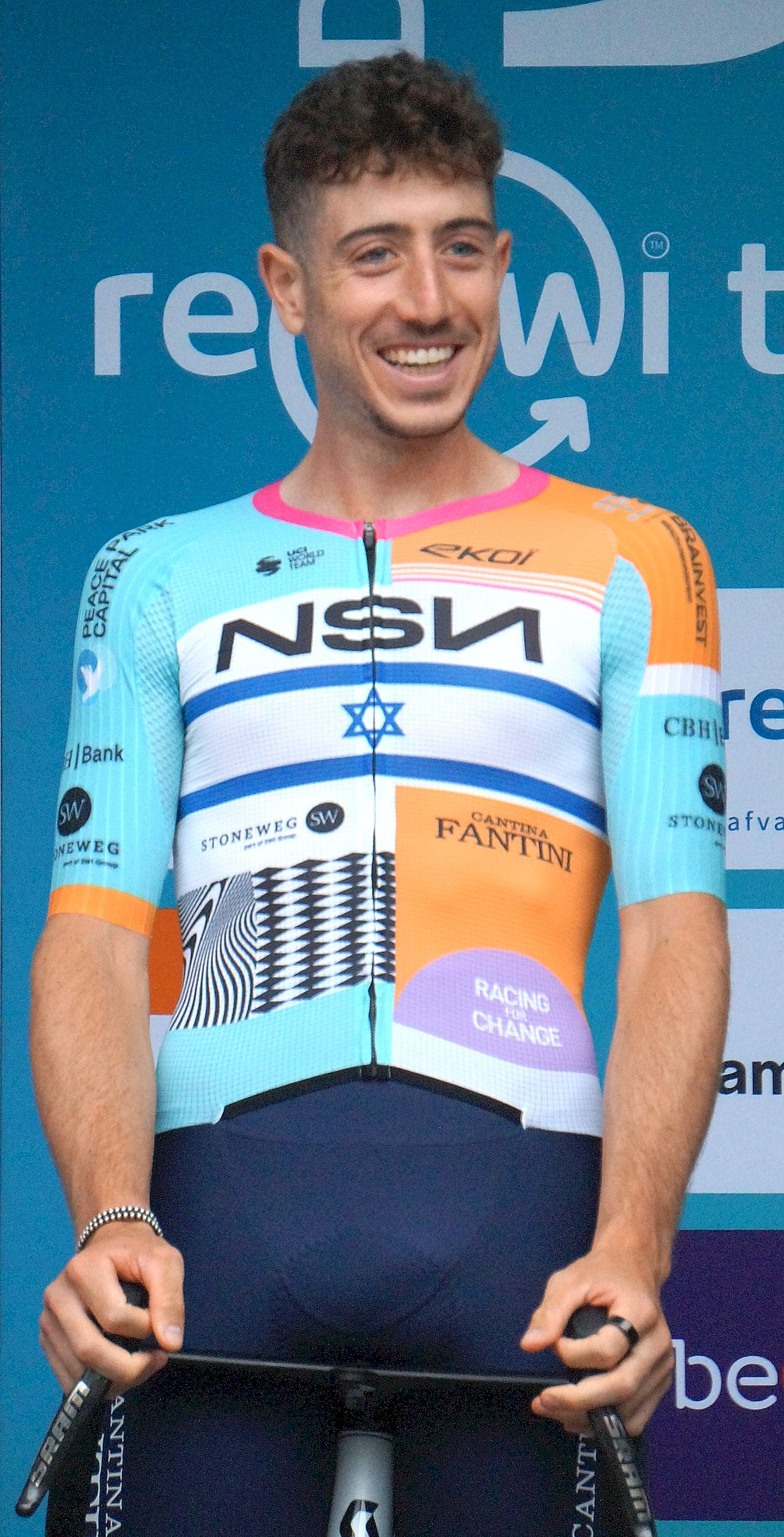
- Raisberg in 2026

Personal information
- Born: 29 March 2001 (age 25) Dafna, Israel
- Height: 1.78 m (5 ft 10 in)
- Weight: 67 kg (148 lb)

Cycling career
- Sport: Cycling
- Current team: NSN Cycling Team
- Disciplines: Road; Mountain biking
- Role: Rider
- Rider type: Sprinter

Amateur team
- 2020: TNT

Professional teams
- 2022–2023: Israel Cycling Academy
- 2024–2025: Israel–Premier Tech
- 2026: NSN Cycling Team

Major wins
- 1st Green Jersey, Tour Auvergne Rhone Alpes 2026

Nadav Raisberg (Hebrew: נדב רייסברג; born 29 March 2001) is an Israeli road cyclist, who currently rides for UCI WorldTour NSN Cycling Team.

== Major results ==
2023
National Road Championships

3rd Road race
3rd Time trial

2026
1st Points classification, Tour Auvergne-Rhône-Alpes

=== Grand Tour general classification results timeline ===
| Grand Tour | 2024 | 2025 |
|---|---|---|
| Giro d'Italia | DNF | — |
| Tour de France | — | — |
| Vuelta a España | 113 | 141 |

Legend
| — | Did not compete |
| DNF | Did not finish |
