= Roy Goldstein =

Israeli cyclist (born 1993)

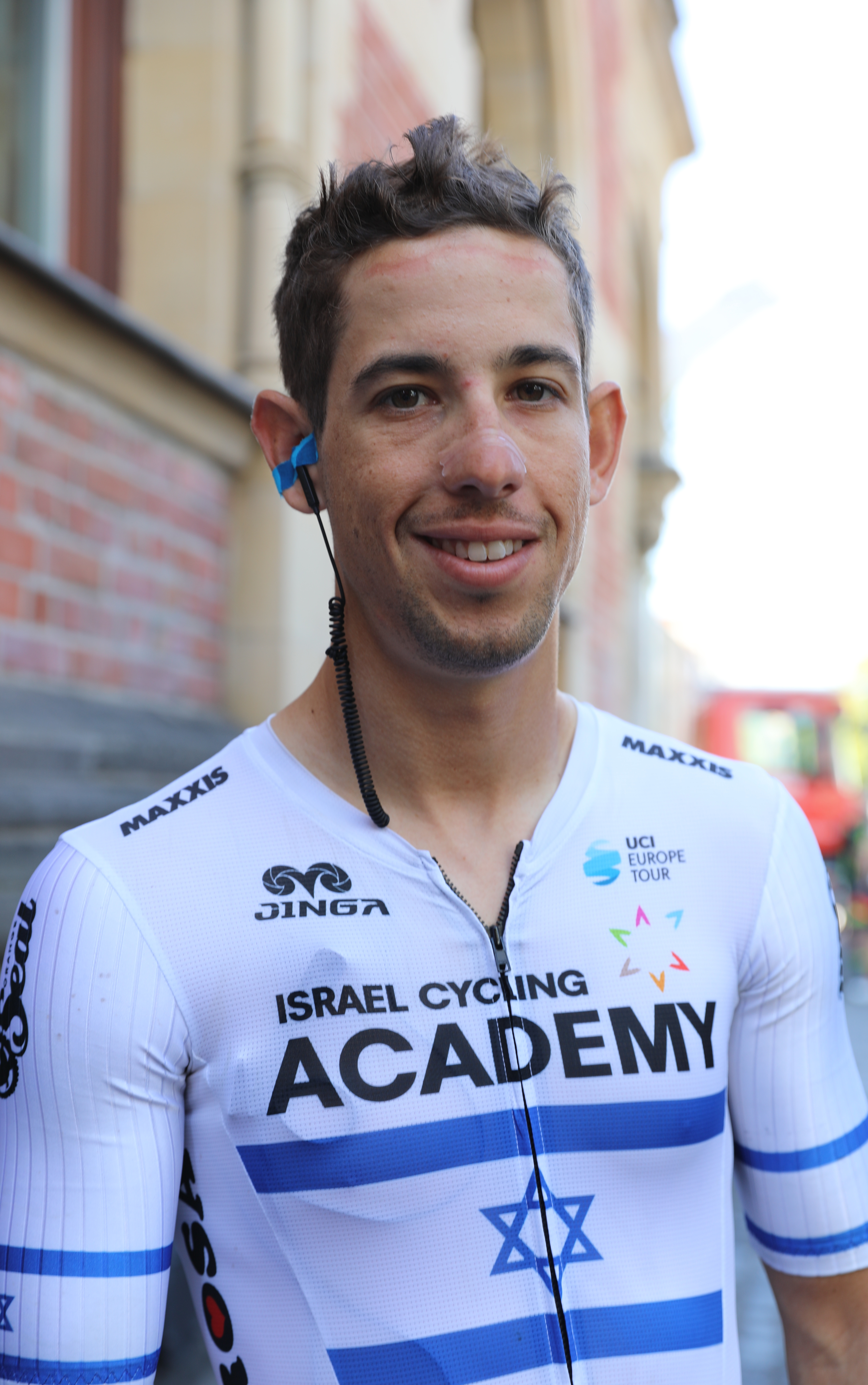
- Goldstein, Rund um Köln, 2019

Personal information
- Full name: Roy Goldstein
- Born: 20 June 1993 (age 33) Misgav, Israel
- Height: 1.74 m (5 ft 9 in)
- Weight: 63 kg (139 lb)

Cycling career
- Sport: Cycling
- Current team: Retired
- Discipline: Road
- Role: Rider

Amateur team
- 2014: 500 Watts

Professional team
- 2015–2019: Cycling Academy

Roy Goldstein (Hebrew: רועי גולדשטיין; born 20 June 1993 in Misgav) is an Israeli former professional cyclist, who competed professionally for the Israel Cycling Academy team between 2015 and 2019.

== Major results ==
2012
2nd Road race, National Road Championships
2014
3rd Road race, National Road Championships
2015
3rd Road race, National Road Championships
2016
3rd Road race, National Road Championships
2017
1st Road race, National Road Championships
2018
1st Road race, National Road Championships
