= Henry Ohayon =

Israeli cyclist (1934–2023)

Henry Ohayon הנרי אוחיון
Personal information
- Born: 17 June 1934 Safi, French protectorate in Morocco
- Died: 27 October 2023 (aged 89) Ashkelon, Israel
- Height: 5 ft 6 in (168 cm)
- Weight: 137 lb (62 kg)

Cycling career
- Sport: Cycling
- Discipline: Road
- Role: Rider

Henry Ohayon (Hebrew: הנרי אוחיון; 17 June 1934 – 27 October 2023) was an Israeli cyclist of Moroccan Jewish descent. He competed in the individual road race at the 1960 Summer Olympics, and came in 39th out of 142 riders, 20 seconds behind gold medal winner Viktor Kapitonov of the Soviet Union.

Ohayon died in Ashkelon, Israel, on 27 October 2023. He was 89 years old.

== See also ==
- Itzhak Ben David, Israeli Olympic individual road race cyclist
- Itamar Einhorn, Israeli road race cyclist
