= Israeli National Road Race Championships =

National road cycling championship in Israel

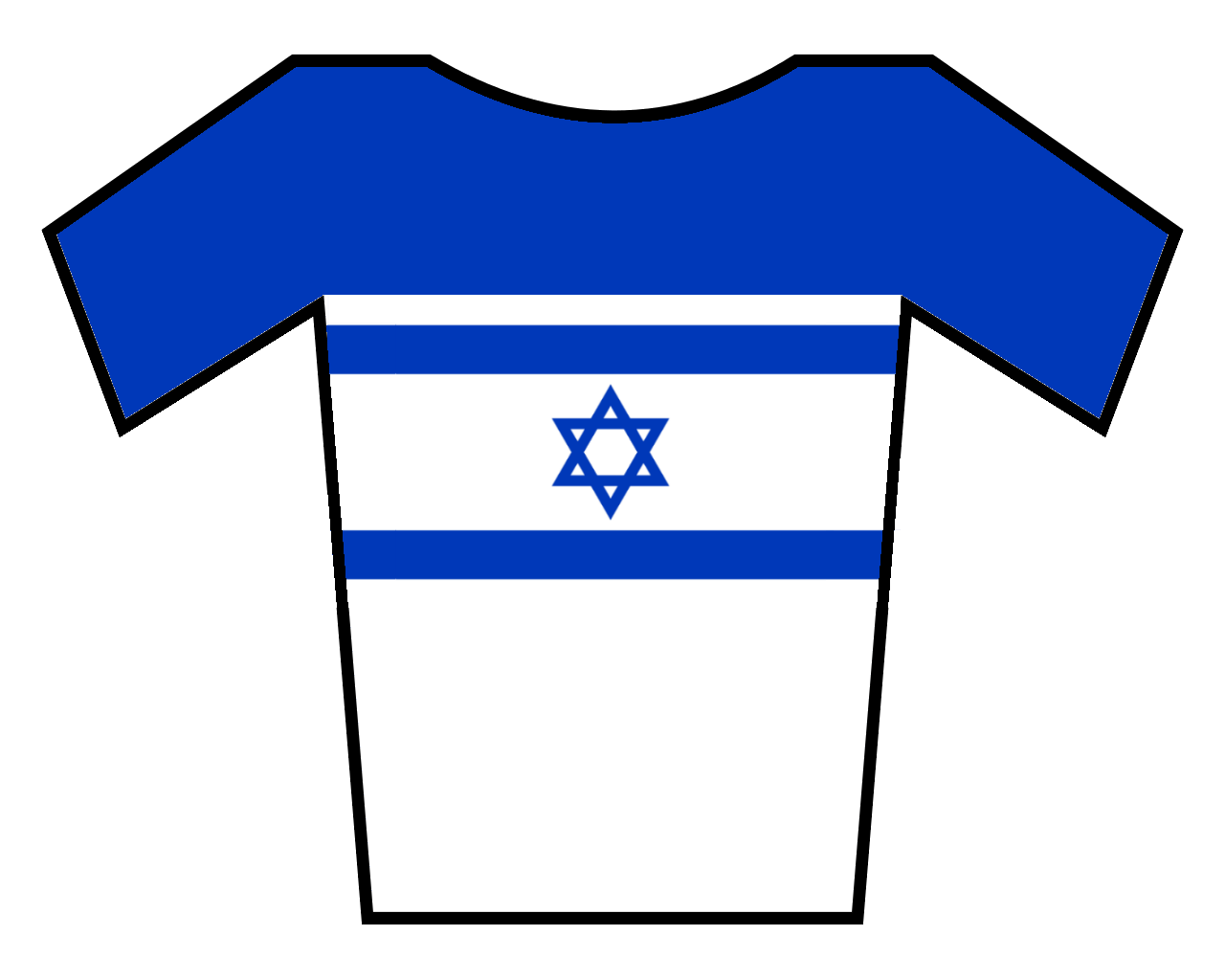
Jersey worn by the champion

The Israeli National Road Race Championships are held annually to decide the cycling champions in the road race discipline, across various categories. The winners of each event are awarded with a symbolic cycling jersey, just like the national flag, these colours can be worn by the rider at other road racing events in the country to show their status as national champion. The champion's stripes can be combined into a sponsored rider's team kit design for this purpose.

== Men ==
=== Elite ===
Israeli National Road Race Championships – Men's elite race
Race details
- Region: Israel
- Discipline: Road bicycle racing
- Type: One-day

History
- First edition: 1998
- First winner: Yuval Steinman
- Most wins: Dor Dviri; Niv Libner; Guy Sagiv (3 wins)
- Most recent: Itamar Einhorn

Year	Gold	Silver	Bronze
1998	Yuval Steinman	Eitzack Boigin	Benjamin Loberant
1999	Eitzack Boigin	Boris Yezulak	Daniel Helstoch
2000	Yuval Steinman	Elian Edelson	Ido Sirkin
2001	Daniel Helstoch	Hidai Bar-Mor	Doron Amitz
2002	Itay Lifshitz	Dror Pekatz	Yanai Cohen
2003	Dor Dviri	Yuriy Levinson	Izhak Boygen
2004	Dor Dviri	Daniel Helstoch	Shagi Bental
2005	Maxim Burlutsky	Amos Wolff	Yarden Gazit
2006	Dor Dviri	Yarden Gazit	Rotem Ishai
2007	Gal Tsachor	Amos Wolff	Doron Amitz
2008	Hortig Nati	Amos Wolff	Eliad Daniel
2009	Avichai Greenberg	Idan Shapira	Niv Libner
2010	Niv Libner	Eyal Rahat	Ran Margaliot
2011	Niv Libner	Yoav Bär	Idan Shapira
2012	Oleg Sergeev	Roy Goldstein	Daniel Eliad
2013	Yuval Dolin	Guy Gabay	Guy Sagiv
2014	Niv Libner	Anton Mikhailov	Roy Goldstein
2015	Guy Sagiv	Guy Gabay	Roy Goldstein
2016	Guy Sagiv	Aviv Yechezkel	Roy Goldstein
2017	Roy Goldstein	Itamar Einhorn	Aviv Yechezkel
2018	Roy Goldstein	Guy Sagiv	Omer Goldstein
2019	Guy Sagiv	Omer Goldstein	Guy Niv
2020	Omer Goldstein	Eiten Levi	Guy Sagiv
2021	Vladislav Loginov	Saned Abu-Fares	Itamar Einhorn
2022	Itamar Einhorn	Guy Sagiv	Omer Goldstein
2023	Itamar Einhorn	Guy Sagiv	Nadav Raisberg

== Women ==
=== Elite ===
Israeli National Road Race Championships – Women's elite race
Race details
- Region: Israel
- Discipline: Road bicycle racing
- Type: One-day

History
- First edition: 2006
- First winner: Inbar Ronen
- Most wins: Omer Shapira (6 wins)
- Most recent: Omer Shapira

Year	Gold	Silver	Bronze
2006	Inbar Ronen	Shani Bloch	Michal Avriel
2007	Leah Goldstein	Hilla Maimon	Shani Bloch
2008	Leah Goldstein	Yarden Golan	Yarden Avidan
2009	Leah Goldstein	Yarden Golan	Yarden Avidan
2010	Inbar Ronen	Michal Ella	Yarden Avidan
2011	Michal Ella	Daniela Levi	Paz Bash
2012	Yuval Bar Ziv	Rotem Gafinovitz	Daniela Levi
2013	Paz Bash	Rotem Gafinovitz	Meghan Beltzer
2014	Paz Bash	Shani Bloch	Omer Shapira
2015	Rotem Gafinovitz	Omer Shapira	Paz Bash
2016	Miriam Bar-On	Rotem Gafinovitz	Omer Shapira
2017	Omer Shapira	Paz Bash	Shani Bloch
2018	Omer Shapira	Rotem Gafinovitz	Paz Bash
2019	Omer Shapira	Rotem Gafinovitz	Paz Bash
2020	Omer Shapira	Lianne Witkin	Antonina Reznikov
2021	Omer Shapira	Rotem Gafinovitz	Nofar Maoz
2022	Omer Shapira	Kathleen Abadie	Rotem Gafinovitz
2023	Antonina Reznikov	Nofar Maoz	Rotem Gafinovitz
