= Israeli National Time Trial Championships =

National road cycling championship in Israel

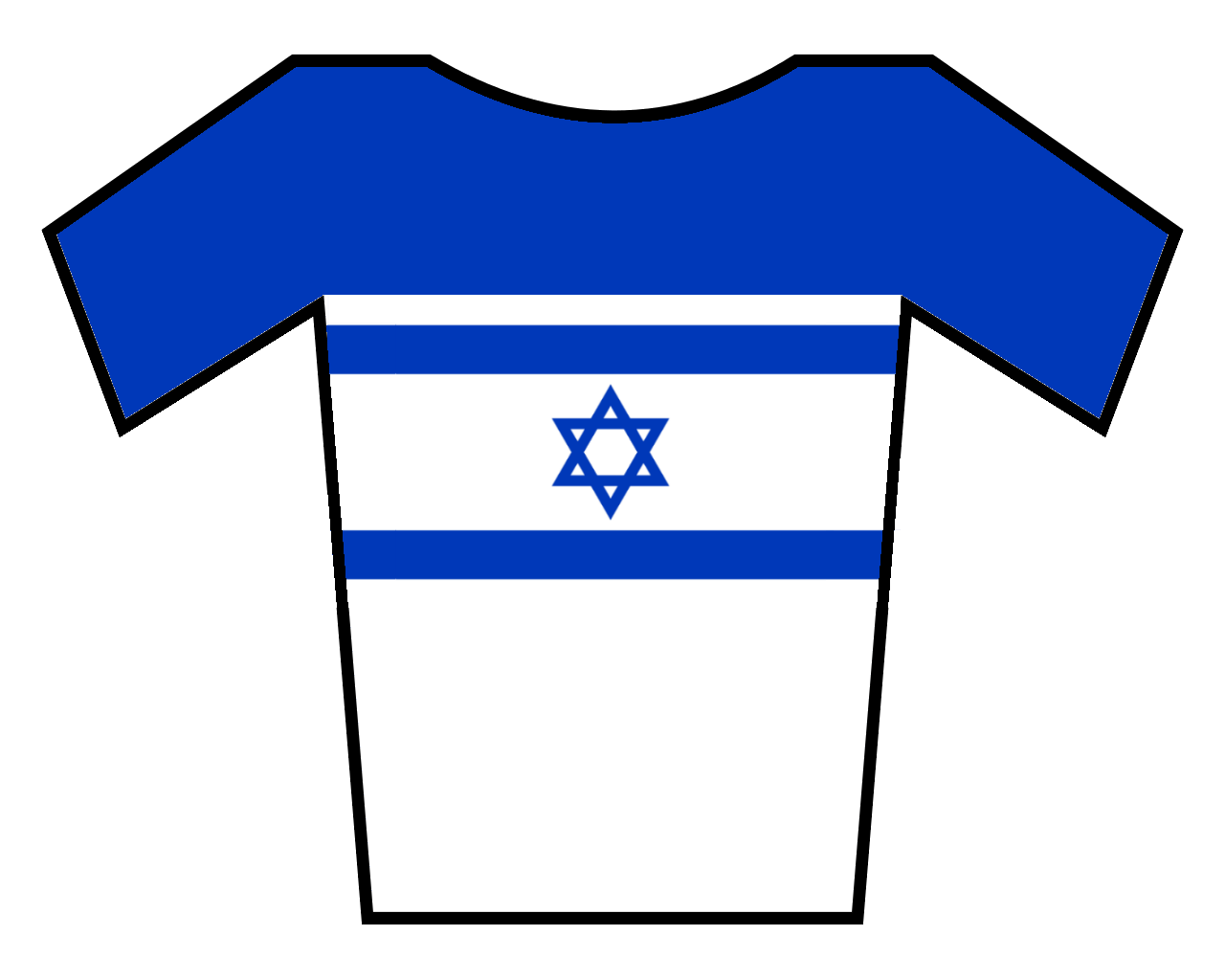
The champion's jersey

The Israeli National Time Trial Championships are held annually to decide the cycling champions in the individual time trial discipline, across various categories. The winners of each event are awarded a symbolic cycling jersey, just like the national flag, these colours can be worn by the rider at other road racing events in the country to show their status as national champion. The champion's stripes can be combined into a sponsored rider's team kit design for this purpose.

== Men ==
=== Elite ===
Israeli National Time Trial Championships – Men's elite race
Race details
- Region: Israel
- Discipline: Road bicycle racing
- Type: One-day

History
- First edition: 1998; 27 years ago
- First winner: Fein Oded
- Most wins: Yoav Bear; Omer Goldstein; Gali Ronen; (3 wins)
- Most recent: Omded Kogut

| Year | Gold | Silver | Bronze |
| 2002 | Fein Oded | Yanai Cohen | Ben-Ami Tshausu |
| 2003 | Daniel Helstoch | Dror Lindner | Nitzan Hendler |
| 2005 | Gali Ronen | Daniel Helstoch | Maxim Burlutsky |
| 2006 | Gali Ronen | Maxim Burlutsky | Izhak Boygen |
| 2007 | Gali Ronen | Anton Mikhailov | Maxim Burlutsky |
| 2008 | Maxim Burlutsky | Eyal Rahat | Nati Hortig |
| 2009 | Ayetor Aizpeazo | Eyal Rahat | Yuval Rachmilevich |
| 2010 | Eyal Rahat | Anton Mikailov | Ido Sirkin |
| 2011 | Eyal Rahat | Yoav Bear | Niv Libner |
| 2012 | Anton Mikhailov | Guy Gabay | Eyal Rahat |
| 2013 (Note: The winner Dmytro Grabovskyy had not yet obtained Israeli citizenship) | Yoav Bear | Anton Mikhailov | Oleg Sergeev |
| 2014 | Yoav Bear | Anton Mikhailov | Oleg Sergeev |
| 2015 (Note: The winner, Dmytro Grabovskyy is not recognized by the UCI on its official website) | Yoav Bear | Aviv Yechezkel | Omer Goldstein |
| 2016 | Aviv Yechezkel | Omer Goldstein | Yoav Bear |
| 2017 | Guy Sagiv | Omer Goldstein | Anton Mikhailov |
| 2018 | Omer Goldstein | Aharon Hitman | Yuval Ben-mordechay |
| 2019 | Guy Niv | Aharon Hitman | Alon Yogev |
| 2020 | Guy Sagiv | Guy Niv | Vladislav Logionov |
| 2021 | Omer Goldstein | Vladislav Logionov | Guy Sagiv |
| 2022 | Omer Goldstein | Oded Kogut | Vladislav Logionov |
| 2022 | Oded Kogut | Omer Goldstein | Nadav Raisberg |

== Women ==
=== Elite ===
Israeli National Time Trial Championships – Women's elite race
Race details
- Region: Israel
- Discipline: Road bicycle racing
- Type: One-day

History
- First edition: 2006
- First winner: Shani Bloch
- Most wins: Paz Bash (5 wins)
- Most recent: Rotem Gafinovitz

| Year | Gold | Silver | Bronze |
| 2006 | Shani Bloch | Inbar Ronen | |
| 2007 | Leah Goldstein | Maimon Hilla | Michal Avriel |
| 2008 | Leah Goldstein | Nina Pekerman | Maimon Hilla |
| 2009 | Leah Goldstein | Yarden Avidan | Einat Argon |
| 2010 | Yarden Avidan | Noga Korem | Einat Argon |
| 2011 | Daniela Levi | Michal Ella | Rotem Gafinovitz |
| 2012 | Paz Bash | Rotem Gafinovitz | Michal Ella |
| 2013 | Paz Bash | Rotem Gafinovitz | Daniela Levi |
| 2014 | Paz Bash | Shani Bloch | Mey-elle Naveh |
| 2015 | Paz Bash | Rotem Gafinovitz | Miriam Bar-On |
| 2016 | Paz Bash | Shani Bloch | Omer Shapira |
| 2017 | Shani Bloch | Rotem Gafinovitz | Paz Bash |
| 2018 | Rotem Gafinovitz | Omer Shapira | Paz Bash |
| 2019 | Rotem Gafinovitz | Paz Bash | Antonina Reznikov |
| 2020 | Omer Shapira | Lianne Witkin | Avital Gez |
| 2021 | Rotem Gafinovitz | Nofar Maoz | Antonina Reznikov |
| 2022 | Omer Shapira | Rotem Gafinovitz | Lianne Witkin |
| 2023 | Rotem Gafinovitz | Antonina Reznikov | Nofar Maoz |
