= Tour of Arava =

Race details
- Date: March
- Region: Israel
- Discipline: Road
- Competition: UCI 1.2 (2016, 2019–)
- Type: Time Trial

History
- First edition: 2016
- Editions: 2 (as of 2019)
- First winner: Antri Christoforou (CYP)
- Most wins: No repeat winners
- Most recent: Rotem Gafinovitz (ISR)

The Tour of Arava is an annual professional road bicycle race for women in Israel.

== Winners ==
Year	Country	Rider	Team
2016	Cyprus	Antri Christoforou	Servetto Footon
2019	Israel	Rotem Gafinovitz	Canyon–SRAM
