= 2015 national road cycling championships =

The 2015 national road cycling championships began in Australia with the time trial event (both men and women) on 8 January, as is tradition.

== Jerseys ==
The winner of each national championship wears the national jersey in all their races for the next year in the respective discipline, apart from the World Championships and the Olympics, or unless they are wearing a category leader's jersey in a stage race. Most national champion jerseys tend to represent a country's flag or use the colours from it. Jerseys may also feature traditional sporting colours of a country that are not derived from a national flag, such as the green and gold on the jerseys of Australian national champions.

== 2015 champions ==
=== Men's Elite ===
Country	Men's Elite Road Race Champion	Road Race Champion's Team	Men's Elite Time Trial Champion	Time Trial Champion's Team
Albania	Redi Halilaj	Amore & Vita–Selle SMP	Eugert Zhupa	Southeast Pro Cycling
Algeria	Abderrahmane Mansouri	Vélo Club Sovac	Abdelkader Belmokhtar	Groupement Sportif des Pétroliers d'Algérie
Andorra	Julio Pintado			
Antigua and Barbuda	Bridges Jyme		Robert Marsh	
Argentina	Daniel Juárez		Alejandro Durán	
Aruba	Jean Junor		Gino Hodge	
Australia	Heinrich Haussler	IAM Cycling	Richie Porte	Team Sky
Austria	Marco Haller	Team Katusha	Georg Preidler	Team Giant–Alpecin
Azerbaijan	Maksym Averin	Synergy Baku	Maksym Averin	Synergy Baku
Bahrain	Mansoor Jawad		Sayed Ahmed Alawi	
Belarus	Andrei Krasilnikau	Minsk Cycling Club	Vasil Kiryienka	Team Sky
Belgium	Preben Van Hecke	Topsport Vlaanderen–Baloise	Jurgen Van den Broeck	Lotto–Soudal
Belize	Giovanni Lovell			
Bermuda	Dominique Mayho		Shannon Lawrence	
Bolivia	Óscar Soliz	Movistar Team América	Óscar Soliz	Movistar Team América
Bosnia and Herzegovina	Aleksa Crncevic			
Brazil	Everson Camilo		Magno Prado Nazaret	Carrefour Funvic Soul Cycling Team
Bulgaria	Nikolay Mihaylov	CCC–Sprandi–Polkowice	Nikolay Mihaylov	CCC–Sprandi–Polkowice
Canada	Guillaume Boivin	Optum–Kelly Benefit Strategies	Hugo Houle	AG2R La Mondiale
Chile	José Luis Rodríguez		Wolfgang Burmann	
Colombia	Robinson Chalapud	Orgullo Antioqueño	Rigoberto Urán	Etixx–Quick-Step
Costa Rica	Bryan Villalobos		Josué González	
Croatia	Emanuel Kišerlovski	Meridiana–Kamen	Matija Kvasina	Team Felbermayr–Simplon Wels
Cuba	José Mogica		José Mogica	
Cyprus	Konstantinos Thymides		Andreas Miltiadis	
Czech Republic	Petr Vakoč	Etixx–Quick-Step	Jan Bárta	Bora–Argon 18
Denmark	Chris Anker Sørensen	Tinkoff–Saxo	Christopher Juul-Jensen	Tinkoff–Saxo
Dominican Republic	Norlandy Tavera	Aero Cycling Team	Rafael Merán	Aero Cycling Team
Ecuador	José Ragonessi	Movistar Team Ecuador	Jonathan Caicedo	
Eritrea	Natnael Berhane	MTN–Qhubeka	Daniel Teklehaimanot	MTN–Qhubeka
Estonia	Gert Jõeäär	Cofidis	Gert Jõeäär	Cofidis
Ethiopia	Tsgabu Grmay	Lampre–Merida	Tsgabu Grmay	Lampre–Merida
Finland	Samuel Pökälä		Samuel Pökälä	
France	Steven Tronet	Auber 93	Jérôme Coppel	IAM Cycling
Germany	Emanuel Buchmann	Bora–Argon 18	Tony Martin	Etixx–Quick-Step
Georgia	Giorgi Nareklishvili		Giorgi Nareklishvili	
Greece	Polychronis Tzortzakis		Ioannis Tamouridis	Synergy Baku
Guatemala	Manuel Oseas Rodas Ochoa	Cable DX-Decorabaños	Manuel Oseas Rodas Ochoa	Cable DX-Decorabaños
Hungary	Istvan Molnar		Krisztián Lovassy	Differdange–Losch
Iceland	Ingvar Ómarsson		Hákon Hrafn Sigurðsson	
Iran	Behnam Maleki	Tabriz Petrochemical Team	Hossein Askari	Pishgaman–Giant
Ireland	Damien Shaw		Ryan Mullen	An Post–Chain Reaction
Israel	Guy Sagiv		Yoav Bear	Cycling Academy
Italy	Vincenzo Nibali	Astana	Adriano Malori	Movistar Team
Jamaica			Peter Thompson	
Japan	Kazushige Kuboki	Team UKYO	Ryutaro Nakamura	
Kazakhstan	Oleg Zemlyakov	Vino 4ever	Alexey Lutsenko	Astana
Kuwait	Salman Alsaffar	Kuwait Cycling Project	Saied Jafer Alali	Kuwait Cycling Project
Latvia	Aleksejs Saramotins	IAM Cycling	Gatis Smukulis	Team Katusha
Lebanon		Rachid Elias Abou	Rachid Elias Abou	
Lithuania	Aidis Kruopis	An Post–Chain Reaction	Ramūnas Navardauskas	Cannondale–Garmin
Luxembourg	Bob Jungels	Trek Factory Racing	Bob Jungels	Trek Factory Racing
Macedonia	Stefan Petrovski		Stefan Petrovski	
Malaysia	Nur Amirul Fakhruddin Marzuki	Terengganu Cycling Team		
Malta	Maurice Formosa			
Mauritius			Christopher Lagane	
Mexico	Ignacio de Jesús Prado		Flavio De Luna	Team SmartStop
Morocco	Soufiane Haddi	Skydive Dubai–Al Ahli	Soufiane Haddi	Skydive Dubai–Al Ahli
Namibia	Dan Craven	Team Europcar	Gerhard Mans	
Netherlands	Niki Terpstra	Etixx–Quick-Step	Wilco Kelderman	LottoNL–Jumbo
New Zealand	Joseph Cooper	Avanti Racing Team	Michael Vink	CCT p/b Champion System
Nicaragua			José Geovanni Rodríguez Cerda	
Norway	Edvald Boasson Hagen	MTN–Qhubeka	Edvald Boasson Hagen	MTN–Qhubeka
Panama			Yelko Gómez	
Poland	Tomasz Marczyński	Torku Şekerspor	Marcin Białobłocki	ONE Pro Cycling
Portugal	Rui Costa	Lampre–Merida	Nelson Oliveira	Lampre–Merida
Puerto Rico	Edgardo Richiez		Juan Martínez	
Romania	Serghei Țvetcov	Androni Giocattoli–Sidermec	Serghei Țvetcov	Androni Giocattoli–Sidermec
Russia	Yuri Trofimov	Team Katusha	Artem Ovechkin	RusVelo
Rwanda	Joseph Biziyaremye		Valens Ndayisenga	
Saint Lucia	Fidel Esnard			
San Marino	Federico Gasperoni			
Serbia	Ivan Stević	Nankang–Dynatek	Gabor Kasa	Nankang–Dynatek
Slovakia	Peter Sagan	Tinkoff–Saxo	Peter Sagan	Tinkoff–Saxo
Slovenia	Luka Pibernik	Lampre–Merida	Jan Tratnik	Amplatz–BMC
South Africa	Jacques Janse van Rensburg	MTN–Qhubeka	Daryl Impey	Orica–GreenEDGE
South Korea	Sanghong Park	RTS–Santic Racing Team	Kyung-gu Jang	Korail Cycling Team
Spain	Alejandro Valverde	Movistar Team	Jonathan Castroviejo	Movistar Team
Suriname			Ruben Vismale	
Sweden	Alexander Gingsjö	Team Tre Berg–Bianchi	Gustav Larsson	Cult Energy Pro Cycling
Switzerland	Danilo Wyss	BMC Racing Team	Silvan Dillier	BMC Racing Team
Syria	Qaser Nazer		Qaser Nazer	
Togo	Abdou Raouf Akanga			
Tunisia	Rafaâ Chtioui	Skydive Dubai–Al Ahli	Rafaâ Chtioui	Skydive Dubai–Al Ahli
Turkey	Ahmet Akdilek	Torku Şekerspor	Ahmet Örken	Torku Şekerspor
Ukraine	Mykhailo Kononenko	Kolss BDC Team	Sergiy Lagkuti	Kolss BDC Team
United Kingdom	Peter Kennaugh	Team Sky	Alex Dowsett	Movistar Team
United States	Matthew Busche	Trek Factory Racing	Andrew Talansky	Cannondale–Garmin
Uruguay	Geovane Fernández			
Uzbekistan	Ruslan Karimov	RTS–Santic Racing Team	Muradjan Halmuratov	
Venezuela	Juan Murillo		Yonder Godoy	Androni Giocattoli–Sidermec

=== Champions in UCI WorldTeams ===
Team	Road Race Champions	Time Trial Champions
AG2R La Mondiale		Hugo Houle (CAN)
Astana	Vincenzo Nibali (ITA)	Alexey Lutsenko (KAZ)
BMC Racing Team	Danilo Wyss (SUI)	Silvan Dillier (SUI)
Etixx–Quick-Step	Niki Terpstra (NED); Petr Vakoč (CZE)	Tony Martin (GER); Rigoberto Urán (COL)
FDJ		
IAM Cycling	Heinrich Haussler (AUS); Aleksejs Saramotins (LAT)	Jérôme Coppel (FRA)
Lampre–Merida	Rui Costa (POR); Tsgabu Grmay (ETH); Luka Pibernik (SLO)	Tsgabu Grmay (ETH); Nelson Oliveira (POR)
Lotto–Soudal		Jurgen Van den Broeck (BEL)
Movistar Team	Alejandro Valverde (ESP)	Jonathan Castroviejo (ESP); Alex Dowsett (GBR); Adriano Malori (ITA)
Orica–GreenEDGE		Daryl Impey (RSA)
Cannondale–Garmin		Ramūnas Navardauskas (LTU); Andrew Talansky (USA)
Team Giant–Alpecin		Georg Preidler (AUT)
Team Katusha	Marco Haller (AUT); Yuri Trofimov (RUS)	Gatis Smukulis (LAT)
LottoNL–Jumbo		Wilco Kelderman (NED)
Team Sky	Peter Kennaugh (GBR)	Vasil Kiryienka (BLR); Richie Porte (AUS)
Tinkoff–Saxo	Peter Sagan (SVK); Chris Anker Sørensen (DEN)	Christopher Juul-Jensen (DEN); Peter Sagan (SVK)
Trek Factory Racing	Matthew Busche (USA); Bob Jungels (LUX)	Bob Jungels (LUX)

=== Women's Elite ===
Country	Women's Elite Road Race Champion	Road Race Champion's Team	Women's Elite Time Trial Champion	Time Trial Champion's Team
Algeria	Aicha Tihar		Aicha Tihar	
Antigua and Barbuda	Tamiko Butler			
Argentina	Julia Sanchez Parma	Itau Shimano Ladies Power Team	Valeria Müller	
Aruba	Cherley van der Linden		Cherley van der Linden	
Australia	Peta Mullens	Wiggle–Honda	Shara Gillow	Rabobank-Liv Woman Cycling Team
Austria	Martina Ritter	BTC City Ljubljana	Martina Ritter	BTC City Ljubljana
Azerbaijan	Olena Pavlukhina	BTC City Ljubljana	Olena Pavlukhina	BTC City Ljubljana
Belarus	Alena Amialiusik	Velocio–SRAM	Alena Amialiusik	Velocio–SRAM
Belgium	Jolien D'Hoore	Wiggle–Honda	Ann-Sophie Duyck	Topsport Vlaanderen–Pro-Duo
Belize	Shalini Zabaneh		Alicia Thompson	
Bermuda	Zoenique Williams		Zoenique Williams	
Bolivia	Daniela Ortuño		Karen Salazar	
Bosnia and Herzegovina	Alma Alijagic		Lejla Tanović	
Brazil	Clemilda Fernandes		Daniela Lionço	
Canada	Joëlle Numainville	Bigla Pro Cycling Team	Karol-Ann Canuel	Velocio–SRAM
Chile	Denisse Ahumanda		Daniela Guajardo	
Colombia	Leidy Natalia Muñoz Ruiz			
Costa Rica	Marcela Rubiano		Katherine Herrera	
Croatia	Mia Radotić	BTC City Ljubljana	Mia Radotić	BTC City Ljubljana
Cuba	Arlenis Sierra		Marlies Mejías	
Cyprus	Karmen Macheriotou		Karmen Macheriotou	
Czech Republic	Martina Sáblíková		Martina Sáblíková	
Denmark	Amalie Dideriksen		Rikke Lønne	
Dominican Republic	Cesarina Ballenilla	Team Caribe	Juana Fernández	Arcoiris
El Salvador	Evelyn García	Lointek	Evelyn García	Lointek
Eritrea			Mossana Debesay	
Estonia	Liisa Ehrberg		Liisi Rist	Inpa Sottoli Giusfredi
Ethiopia	Eyerusalem Kelil	S.C. Michela Fanini Rox	Eyerusalem Kelil	S.C. Michela Fanini Rox
Finland	Lotta Lepistö	Bigla Pro Cycling Team	Lotta Lepistö	Bigla Pro Cycling Team
France	Pauline Ferrand-Prévot	Rabobank-Liv Woman Cycling Team	Audrey Cordon	Wiggle–Honda
Germany	Trixi Worrack	Velocio–SRAM	Mieke Kröger	Velocio–SRAM
Greece	Argiro Milaki		Varvara Fasoi	
Guatemala	Jazmin Soto		Andrea Guillén	
Hong Kong	Meng Zhaojuan		Pang Yao	
Hungary	Diána Szurominé Pulsfort		Veronika Kormos	
Iceland	Björk Kristjánsdóttir		Birna Björnsdóttir	
Iran	Reyhaneh Khatouni		Reyhaneh Khatouni	
Ireland	Lydia Boylan		Siobhan Horgan	
Israel	Rotem Gafinovitz		Paz Bash	
Italy	Elena Cecchini	Lotto–Soudal Ladies		
Japan	Mayuko Hagiwara	Wiggle–Honda	Eri Yonamine	
Kazakhstan	Natalya Saifutdinova	Astana–Acca Due O	Yekaterina Yuraitis	Astana–Acca Due O
Kuwait	Najla Aljuraiwi		Najla Aljuraiwi	
Latvia	Lija Laizāne	Aromitalia Vaiano	Lija Laizāne	Aromitalia Vaiano
Lithuania	Daiva Tušlaitė	Inpa Sottoli Giusfredi	Aušrinė Trebaitė	
Luxembourg	Christine Majerus	Boels–Dolmans	Christine Majerus	Boels–Dolmans
Malaysia	Nurul Suhada Zainal			
Mexico	Erika Haydee Varela Huerta		Íngrid Drexel	Astana–Acca Due O
Morocco	Nadia Skoukdi		Mounia Benaji	
Namibia	Vera Adrian		Vera Adrian	
Netherlands	Lucinda Brand	Rabobank-Liv Woman Cycling Team	Anna van der Breggen	Rabobank-Liv Woman Cycling Team
New Zealand	Linda Villumsen	UnitedHealthcare	Jaime Nielsen	BePink–La Classica
Norway	Miriam Bjørnsrud	Team Hitec Products	Cecilie Gotaas Johnsen	Team Hitec Products
Panama	Yineth Cubilla			
Peru	Delia López		Noemí Yucra Ñaupa	
Philippines	Jermyn Prado		Jermyn Prado	
Poland			Eugenia Bujak	BTC City Ljubljana
Portugal	Daniela Reis		Daniela Reis	
Puerto Rico	Solymar Rivera		Nilmarie González	
Romania	Ana Maria Covrig	BePink–La Classica	Ana Maria Covrig	BePink–La Classica
Russia	Anna Potokina	Servetto Footon	Tatiana Antoshina	Servetto Footon
Serbia	Maja Markovic		Maja Markovic	
Slovakia	Alžbeta Pavlendová		Tereza Medveďová	BePink–La Classica
Slovenia	Polona Batagelj	BTC City Ljubljana		
South Africa	Ashleigh Moolman	Bigla Pro Cycling Team	Ashleigh Moolman	Bigla Pro Cycling Team
South Korea	Gu Sun-geun		Lee Ju-mi	
Spain	Anna Sanchis	Wiggle–Honda	Anna Sanchis	Wiggle–Honda
Sweden	Emma Johansson	Orica–AIS	Emma Johansson	Orica–AIS
Switzerland	Jolanda Neff	Servetto Footon	Doris Schweizer	Bigla Pro Cycling Team
Syria	Roba Helane		Roba Helane	
Thailand	Jutatip Maneephan		Jutatip Maneephan	
Tunisia	Nour Dissem		Nour Dissem	
Turkey	Esra Kurkcu	Kapadokya BSK	Cansu Türkmenoglu	Brisaspor
Ukraine	Tetyana Ryabchenko	Inpa Sottoli Giusfredi	Hanna Solovey	
United Kingdom	Lizzie Armitstead	Boels–Dolmans	Hayley Simmonds	Velosport Pasta Montegrappa
United States	Megan Guarnier	Boels–Dolmans	Kristin Armstrong	Twenty16 p/b Sho-Air
Venezuela	Jennifer Cesar		Jennifer Cesar	
Zimbabwe	Greer Wynn		Greer Wynn	

== See also ==
- 2015 in men's road cycling
- 2015 in women's road cycling
