= 2015 Cofidis season =

Cofidis
- 2015 season
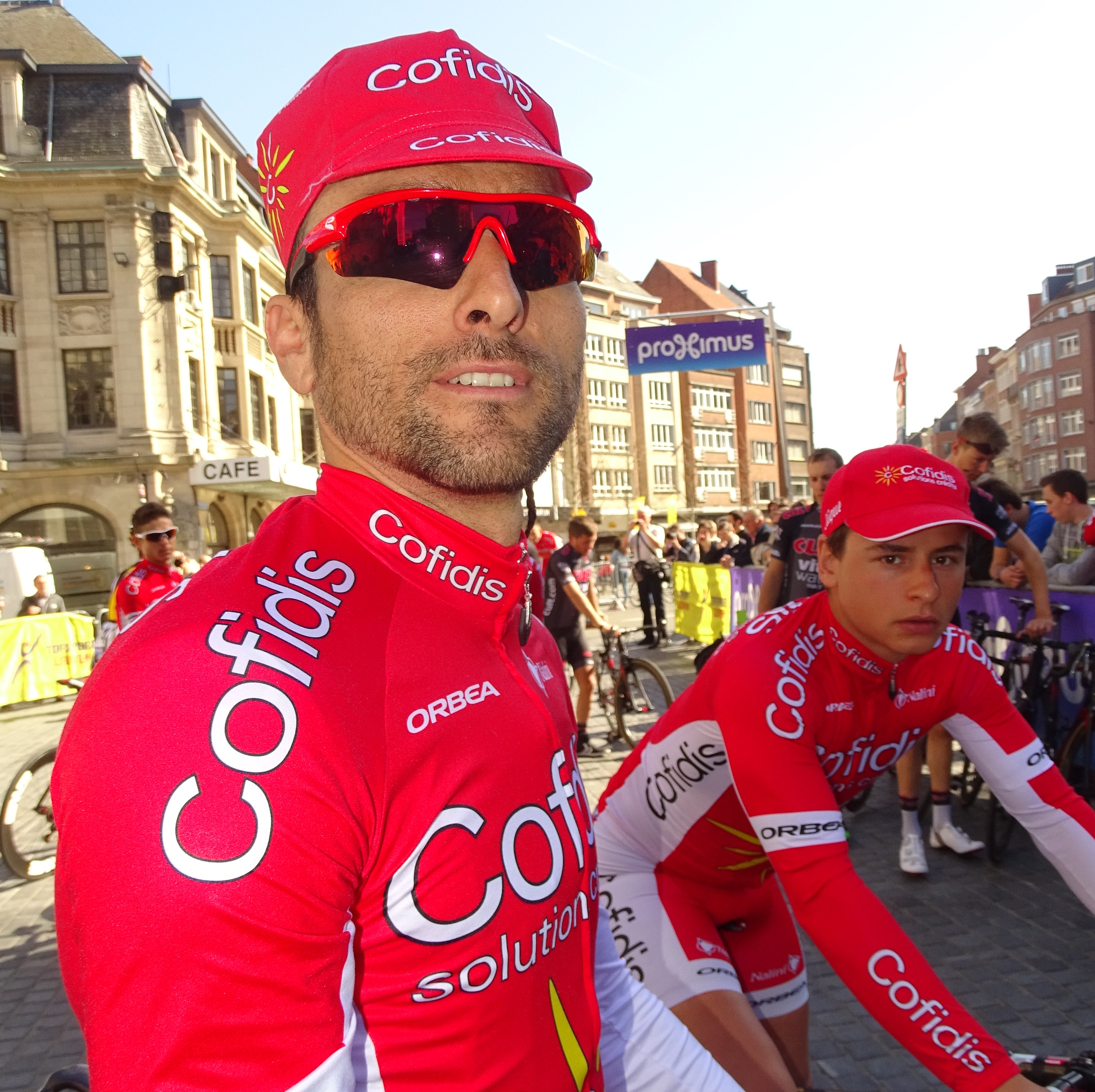
- Cofidis team at the 2015 Brabantse Pijl
- UCI code: COF
- Status: UCI Professional Continental
- Manager: Yvon Sanquer
- Main sponsor(s): Cofidis
- Based: France
- Bicycles: Orbea

Season victories
- One-day races: 6
- Stage race overall: 1
- Stage race stages: 11
- National Championships: 2

The 2015 season for the Cofidis cycling team began in February at the Clásica de Almería. The team participated in UCI Europe Tour races and UCI World Tour events when given a wildcard invitation.

== 2015 roster ==
Rider	Date of birth
Jonas Ahlstrand (SWE)	16 February 1990 (age 35)
Yoann Bagot (FRA)	6 September 1987 (age 37)
Nacer Bouhanni (FRA)	25 July 1990 (age 34)
Steve Chainel (FRA)	6 September 1983 (age 41)
Loïc Chetout (FRA)	23 September 1992 (age 32)
Nicolas Edet (FRA)	2 December 1987 (age 37)
Romain Hardy (FRA)	24 August 1988 (age 36)
Gert Jõeäär (EST)	9 July 1987 (age 37)
Christophe Laporte (FRA)	11 December 1992 (age 32)
Cyril Lemoine (FRA)	3 March 1983 (age 42)
Luis Ángel Maté (ESP)	23 March 1984 (age 40)
Rudy Molard (FRA)	17 September 1989 (age 35)
Daniel Navarro (ESP)	8 July 1983 (age 41)

Rider	Date of birth
Adrien Petit (FRA)	26 September 1990 (age 34)
Dominique Rollin (CAN)	29 October 1982 (age 42)
Stéphane Rossetto (FRA)	6 April 1987 (age 37)
Florian Sénéchal (FRA)	10 July 1993 (age 31)
Julien Simon (FRA)	4 October 1985 (age 39)
Geoffrey Soupe (FRA)	22 March 1988 (age 36)
Anthony Turgis (FRA)	16 May 1994 (age 30)
Kenneth Vanbilsen (BEL)	1 June 1990 (age 34)
Michael Van Staeyen (BEL)	13 August 1988 (age 36)
Clément Venturini (FRA)	16 October 1993 (age 31)
Louis Verhelst (BEL)	28 August 1990 (age 34)
Romain Zingle (BEL)	29 January 1987 (age 38)

Riders who joined the team for the 2015 season

Rider	2014 team
Jonas Ahlstrand	Giant–Shimano
Nacer Bouhanni	FDJ.fr
Steve Chainel	Ag2r–La Mondiale
Loïc Chetout	neo-pro (GSC Blagnac)
Dominique Rollin	
Stéphane Rossetto	BigMat-Auber 93
Geoffrey Soupe	FDJ.fr
Anthony Turgis	neo-pro (CC Nogent-sur-Oise)
Kenneth Vanbilsen	Topsport Vlaanderen–Baloise
Michael Van Staeyen	Topsport Vlaanderen–Baloise

Riders who left the team during or after the 2014 season

Rider	2015 team
Jérémy Bescond	Charvieu-Chavagneux
Edwig Cammaerts	Veranclassic-Ekoi
Jérôme Coppel	IAM Cycling
Julien Fouchard	
Egoitz García	Murias Taldea
Romain Lemarchand	Cult Energy Pro Cycling
Christophe Le Mével	Retired
Guillaume Levarlet	CC Nogent-sur-Oise
Stéphane Poulhies	Occitane CF
Rein Taaramäe	Astana

== Season victories ==
Date	Race	Competition	Rider	Country	Location
22 February	Vuelta a Andalucía, Andalusian rider classification	UCI Europe Tour	Luis Ángel Maté (ESP)	Spain	
7 April	Circuit de la Sarthe, Stage 1	UCI Europe Tour	Nacer Bouhanni (FRA)	France	Varades
10 April	Circuit de la Sarthe, Stage 4	UCI Europe Tour	Nacer Bouhanni (FRA)	France	Le Lude
10 April	Circuit de la Sarthe, Points classification	UCI Europe Tour	Nacer Bouhanni (FRA)	France	
16 April	Grand Prix de Denain	UCI Europe Tour	Nacer Bouhanni (FRA)	France	Denain
3 May	Tour de Yorkshire, Mountains classification	UCI Europe Tour	Nicolas Edet (FRA)	United Kingdom	
7 May	Four Days of Dunkirk, Stage 2	UCI Europe Tour	Jonas Ahlstrand (SWE)	France	Maubeuge
3 June	Tour de Luxembourg, Prologue	UCI Europe Tour	Adrien Petit (FRA)	Luxembourg	Luxembourg City
6 June	Boucles de la Mayenne, Stage 2	UCI Europe Tour	Anthony Turgis (FRA)	France	Lassay-les-Châteaux
7 June	Boucles de la Mayenne, Overall	UCI Europe Tour	Anthony Turgis (FRA)	France	
7 June	Boucles de la Mayenne, Young rider classification	UCI Europe Tour	Anthony Turgis (FRA)	France	
8 June	Critérium du Dauphiné, Stage 2	UCI World Tour	Nacer Bouhanni (FRA)	France	Parc des Oiseaux Villars-les-Dombes
10 June	Critérium du Dauphiné, Stage 4	UCI World Tour	Nacer Bouhanni (FRA)	France	Sisteron
14 June	Critérium du Dauphiné, Points classification	UCI World Tour	Nacer Bouhanni (FRA)	France	
24 June	Halle–Ingooigem	UCI Europe Tour	Nacer Bouhanni (FRA)	Belgium	Ingooigem
31 July	Circuito de Getxo	UCI Europe Tour	Nacer Bouhanni (FRA)	Spain	Getxo
12 August	Tour de l'Ain, Stage 1	UCI Europe Tour	Nacer Bouhanni (FRA)	France	Saint-Vulbas
12 August	Tour de l'Ain, Stage 2	UCI Europe Tour	Nacer Bouhanni (FRA)	France	Pont-de-Vaux
20 August	Tour du Limousin, Stage 3	UCI Europe Tour	Rudy Molard (FRA)	France	Aigurande
20 September	Grand Prix d'Isbergues	UCI Europe Tour	Nacer Bouhanni (FRA)	France	Isbergues
4 October	Tour de l'Eurométropole, Stage 4	UCI Europe Tour	Jonas Ahlstrand (SWE)	Belgium	Tournai
4 October	Tour de Vendée	UCI Europe Tour	Christophe Laporte (FRA)	France	La Roche-sur-Yon
13 October	Nationale Sluitingsprijs	UCI Europe Tour	Nacer Bouhanni (FRA)	Belgium	Putte

== National, Continental and World champions 2015 ==
Date	Discipline	Jersey	Rider	Country	Location
25 June	Estonian National Time Trial Champion		Gert Jõeäär (EST)	Estonia	Vändra
28 June	Estonian National Road Race Champion		Gert Jõeäär (EST)	Estonia	Vändra
