= 2014 Cofidis season =

Cofidis
- 2014 season
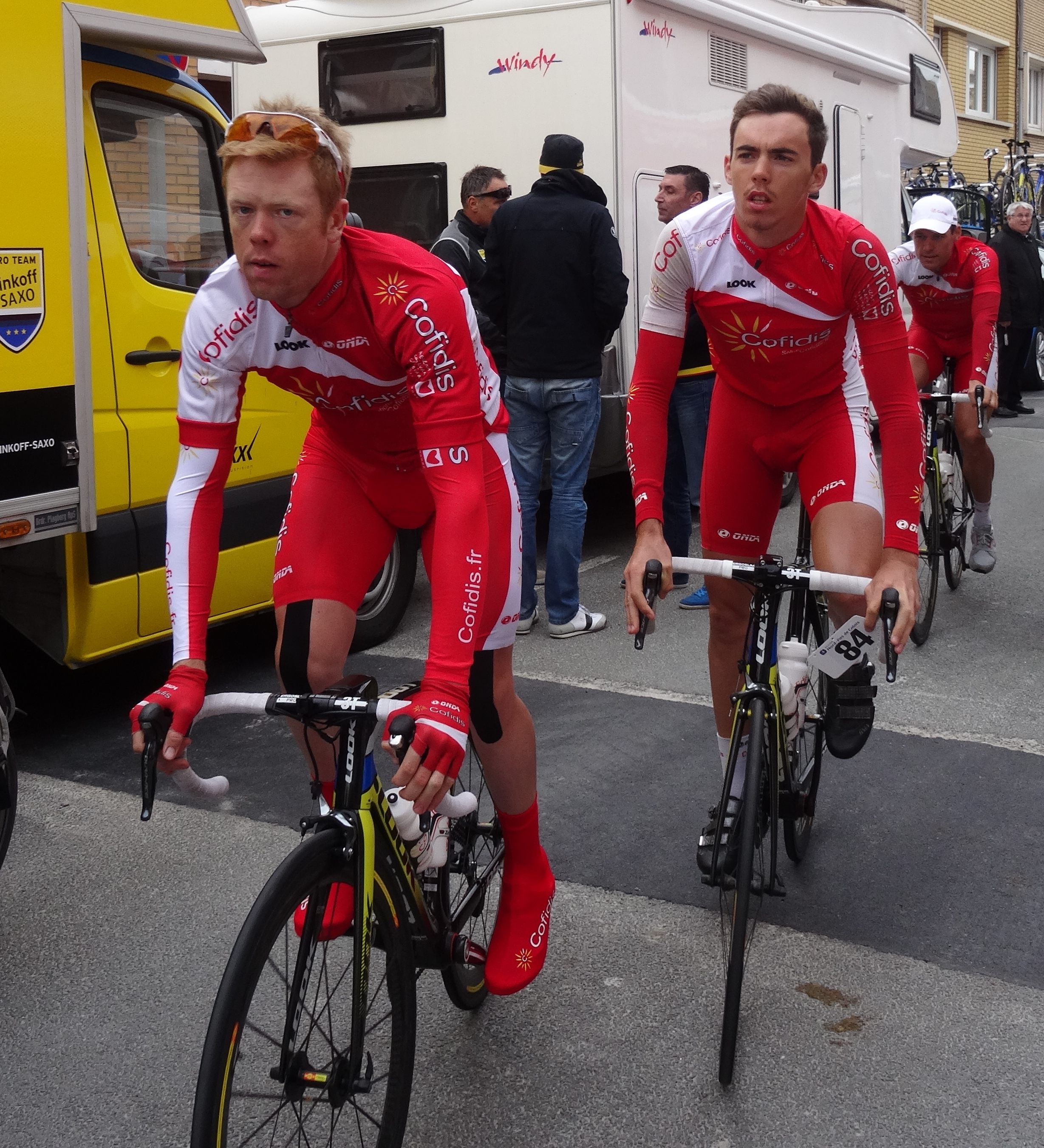
- Romain Zingle, Christophe Laporte and Stéphane Poulhiès on 2014 Tour de France
- UCI code: COF
- Status: UCI Professional Continental
- Manager: Éric Boyer
- Main sponsor(s): Cofidis
- Based: France

Season victories
- One-day races: 3
- Stage race overall: 1
- Stage race stages: 5
- National Championships: 2
- Most wins: Rein Taaramäe (2 wins)

The 2014 season for the Cofidis cycling team began in January at the La Tropicale Amissa Bongo. The team participated in UCI Europe Tour races and UCI World Tour events when given a wildcard invitation.

== 2014 roster ==
As of 27 January 2014.

| Rider | Date of birth |
|---|---|
| Yoann Bagot (FRA) | 6 September 1987 (age 38) |
| Jérémy Bescond (FRA) | 27 February 1991 (age 34) |
| Edwig Cammaerts (BEL) | 17 July 1987 (age 38) |
| Jérôme Coppel (FRA) | 6 August 1986 (age 39) |
| Nicolas Edet (FRA) | 2 December 1987 (age 37) |
| Julien Fouchard (FRA) | 20 June 1986 (age 39) |
| Egoitz García (ESP) | 31 March 1986 (age 39) |
| Romain Hardy (FRA) | 24 August 1988 (age 37) |
| Gert Jõeäär (EST) | 9 July 1987 (age 38) |
| Christophe Laporte (FRA) | 11 December 1992 (age 32) |
| Christophe Le Mével (FRA) | 11 September 1980 (age 45) |
| Romain Lemarchand (FRA) | 26 July 1987 (age 38) |
| Cyril Lemoine (FRA) | 3 March 1983 (age 42) |

| Rider | Date of birth |
|---|---|
| Guillaume Levarlet (FRA) | 25 July 1985 (age 40) |
| Luis Ángel Maté (ESP) | 23 March 1984 (age 41) |
| Rudy Molard (FRA) | 17 September 1989 (age 36) |
| Daniel Navarro (ESP) | 8 July 1983 (age 42) |
| Adrien Petit (FRA) | 26 September 1990 (age 35) |
| Stéphane Poulhies (FRA) | 26 June 1985 (age 40) |
| Florian Sénéchal (FRA) | 10 July 1993 (age 32) |
| Julien Simon (FRA) | 4 October 1985 (age 40) |
| Rein Taaramäe (EST) | 24 April 1987 (age 38) |
| Clément Venturini (FRA) | 16 October 1993 (age 32) |
| Louis Verhelst (BEL) | 28 August 1990 (age 35) |
| Romain Zingle (BEL) | 29 January 1987 (age 38) |

Riders who joined the team for the 2014 season

| Rider | 2013 team |
|---|---|
| Christophe Laporte | neo-pro (AVC Aix-en-Provence) |
| Cyril Lemoine | Sojasun |
| Florian Sénéchal | neo-pro (Etixx–IHNed) |
| Julien Simon | Sojasun |
| Clément Venturini | neo-pro (Vulco-VC Vaulx en Velin) |
| Louis Verhelst | neo-pro (Etixx–IHNed) |

Riders who left the team during or after the 2013 season

| Rider | 2014 team |
|---|---|
| Florent Barle | |
| Cyril Bessy | Retired |
| Jan Ghyselinck | Wanty–Groupe Gobert |
| Arnaud Labbe | CC Périgueux Dordogne |
| Nico Sijmens | Wanty–Groupe Gobert |
| Tristan Valentin | |

== Season victories ==
| Date | Race | Competition | Rider | Country | Location |
|---|---|---|---|---|---|
| 19 January | La Tropicale Amissa Bongo, Young rider classification | UCI Africa Tour | Florian Sénéchal (FRA) | Gabon | |
| 7 March | Driedaagse van West-Vlaanderen, Prologue | UCI Europe Tour | Gert Jõeäär (EST) | Belgium | Middelkerke |
| 9 March | Driedaagse van West-Vlaanderen, Overall | UCI Europe Tour | Gert Jõeäär (EST) | Belgium | |
| 20 April | Tro-Bro Léon | UCI Europe Tour | Adrien Petit (FRA) | France | Lannilis |
| 29 April | Tour of Turkey, Stage 3 | UCI Europe Tour | Rein Taaramäe (EST) | Turkey | Elmalı |
| 4 May | Tour of Turkey, Teams classification | UCI Europe Tour | (Note: The riders on the squad were Yoann Bagot, Jérémy Bescond, Nicolas Edet, Romain Hardy, Christophe Le Mével, Romain Lemarchand, Rein Taaramäe and Louis Verhelst) | Turkey | |
| 17 May | Rhône-Alpes Isère Tour, Stage 3 | UCI Europe Tour | Nicolas Edet (FRA) | France | Saint-Maurice-l'Exil |
| 18 May | Rhône-Alpes Isère Tour, Stage 4 | UCI Europe Tour | Clément Venturini (FRA) | France | Charvieu-Chavagneux |
| 18 May | Rhône-Alpes Isère Tour, Points classification | UCI Europe Tour | Clément Venturini (FRA) | France | |
| 31 May | Grand Prix de Plumelec-Morbihan | UCI Europe Tour | Julien Simon (FRA) | France | Plumelec |
| 8 June | Tour de Luxembourg, Young rider classification | UCI Europe Tour | Rudy Molard (FRA) | Luxembourg | |
| 5 September | Vuelta a España, Stage 13 | UCI World Tour | Daniel Navarro (ESP) | Spain | Obregón, Parque de Cabárceno |
| 14 September | Tour du Doubs | UCI Europe Tour | Rein Taaramäe (EST) | France | Pontarlier |

== National, Continental and World champions ==
| Date | Discipline | Jersey | Rider | Country | Location |
|---|---|---|---|---|---|
| 27 June | Estonian Time Trial Champion | | Gert Jõeäär (EST) | Estonia | |
| | French U23 Cyclo-cross Champion | | Clément Venturini (FRA) | France | |
