= 2013 UCI Road World Championships – Women's team time trial =

Women's team time trial
2013 UCI Road World Championships
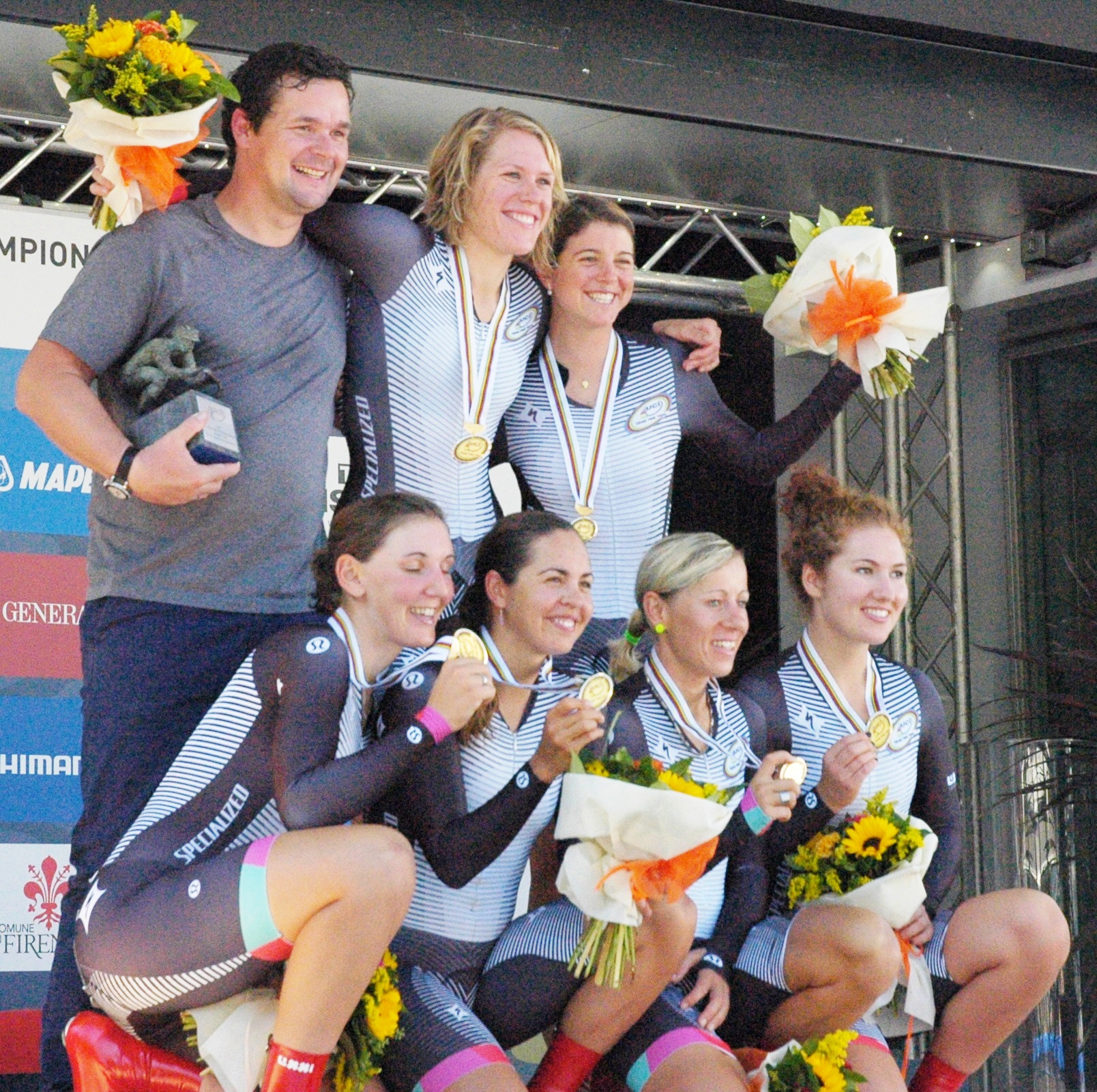
- Specialized–lululemon won the World title.

Race details
- Dates: 22 September 2013
- Stages: 1
- Distance: 42.79 km (26.59 mi)
- Winning time: 51' 10.69"

Medalists
	Gold	Specialized–lululemon (United States)
	Silver	Rabobank-Liv Giant (Netherlands)
	Bronze	Orica–AIS (Australia)

Full re-run Highlights

The Women's team time trial of the 2013 UCI Road World Championships took place on 22 September 2013 in the region of Tuscany, Italy.

The course of the race was 42.79 km (26.6 mi) from the town of Pistoia to the Nelson Mandela Forum in Florence.

== Qualification ==
Invitations were sent to the 20 leading UCI Women's Teams in the 2013 UCI Team Ranking on 15 August 2013. Teams that accepted the invitation within the deadline had the right to participate. The Italian team Vaiano Fondriest (placed 23rd) also received an invitation. Every participating team selected six riders from its team roster (excluding stagiaires) to compete in the event.

The UCI women's teams that received an invitation are listed below in order of the team ranking as of 15 August 2013. Teams that did not accept the invitation are listed below in italics. In total sixteen teams from eight nations (where the teams are based) participated.

#	Nat	Team
1	(Netherlands)	Rabobank-Liv Giant
2	(Australia)	Orica–AIS
3	(United States)	Specialized–lululemon
4	(Norway)	Hitec Products UCK
5	(United Kingdom)	Wiggle–Honda
6	(Belgium)	Sengers Ladies Cycling Team
7	(Italy)	BePink
8	(Lithuania)	Pasta Zara–Cogeas
9	(Italy)	MCipollini–Giordana
10	(Netherlands)	Team Argos–Shimano
11	(Belgium)	Lotto–Belisol Ladies
12	(United States)	Team TIBCO–To The Top
13	(Netherlands)	Boels–Dolmans Cycling Team
14	(United States)	Optum p/b Kelly Benefit Strategies
15	(Russia)	RusVelo
16	(Italy)	Faren Kuota
17	(Lithuania)	Chirio Forno D'Asolo
18	(Italy)	S.C. Michela Fanini–Rox
19	(Canada)	GSD Gestion–Kallisto
20	(Uzbekistan)	Team Pratomagno Women
23	(Italy)	Vaiano Fondriest

== Preview ==
Specialized–lululemon, which won the team time trial at the 2012 Championships, was the favourite for the event. The team won the 42.5 km (26.4 mi) UCI World Cup team time trial race, the Open de Suède Vårgårda TTT 38 seconds ahead of Rabobank-Liv Giant, who finished fourth at the 2012 championships, and 1' 26" ahead of 2012 runners-up Orica–AIS on 16 August.

As well as this, Specialized–lululemon won all team time trials held during the 2013 season; at the Lotto–Belisol Belgium Tour, they won the 19.75 km (12.3 mi) team time trial by 35 seconds from Orica–AIS, while Rabobank-Liv Giant did not participate. At the Holland Ladies Tour, Specialized–lululemon won the 32.2 km (20.0 mi) km team time trial by 15 seconds ahead of Orica–AIS, and 37 seconds ahead of Rabobank-Liv Giant.

== Schedule ==
Date	Time	Event
22 September 2013	10:00–11:35	Women's team time trial
22 September 2013	11:55	Victory ceremony

== Final classification ==
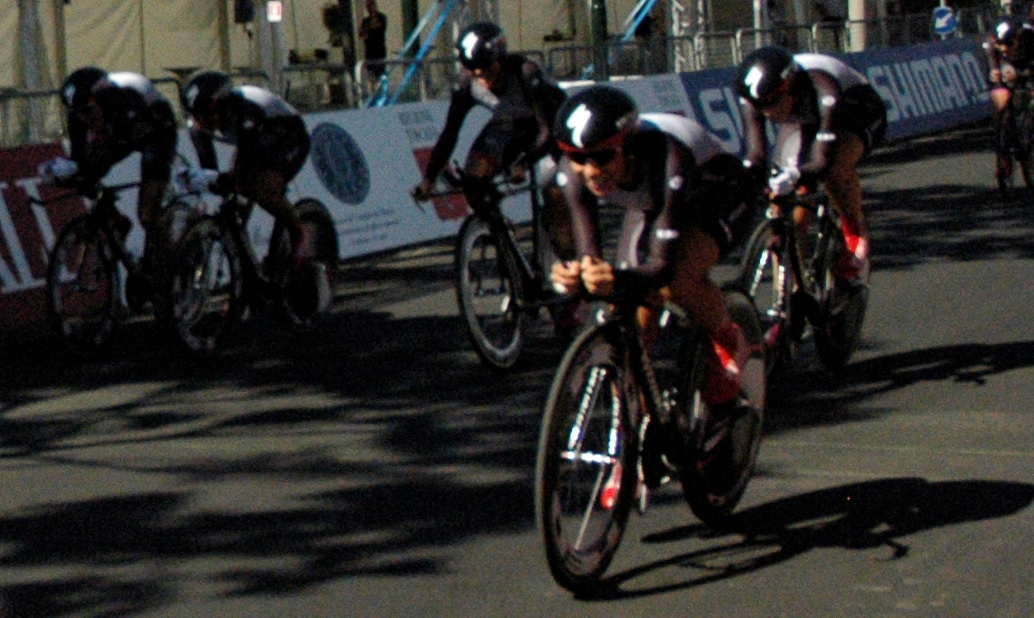
Specialized–lululemon

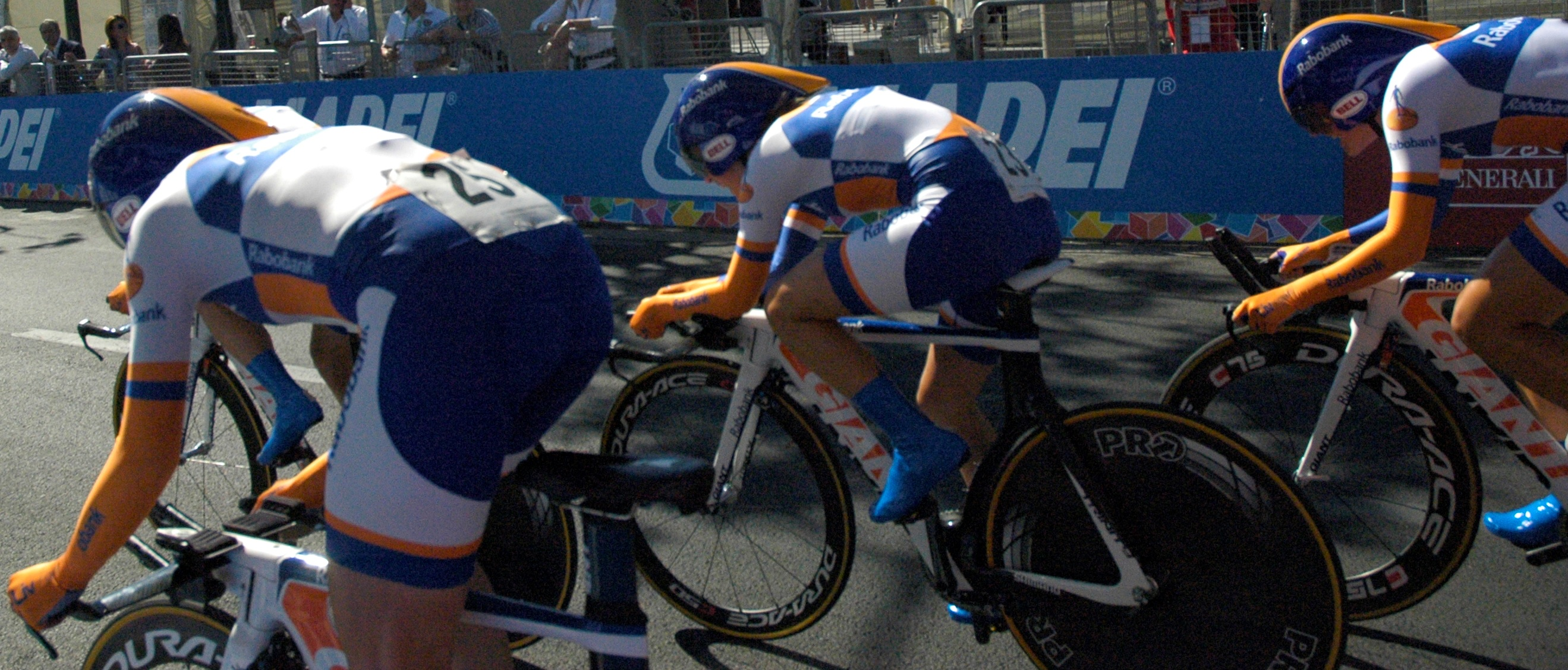
Rabobank-Liv Giant

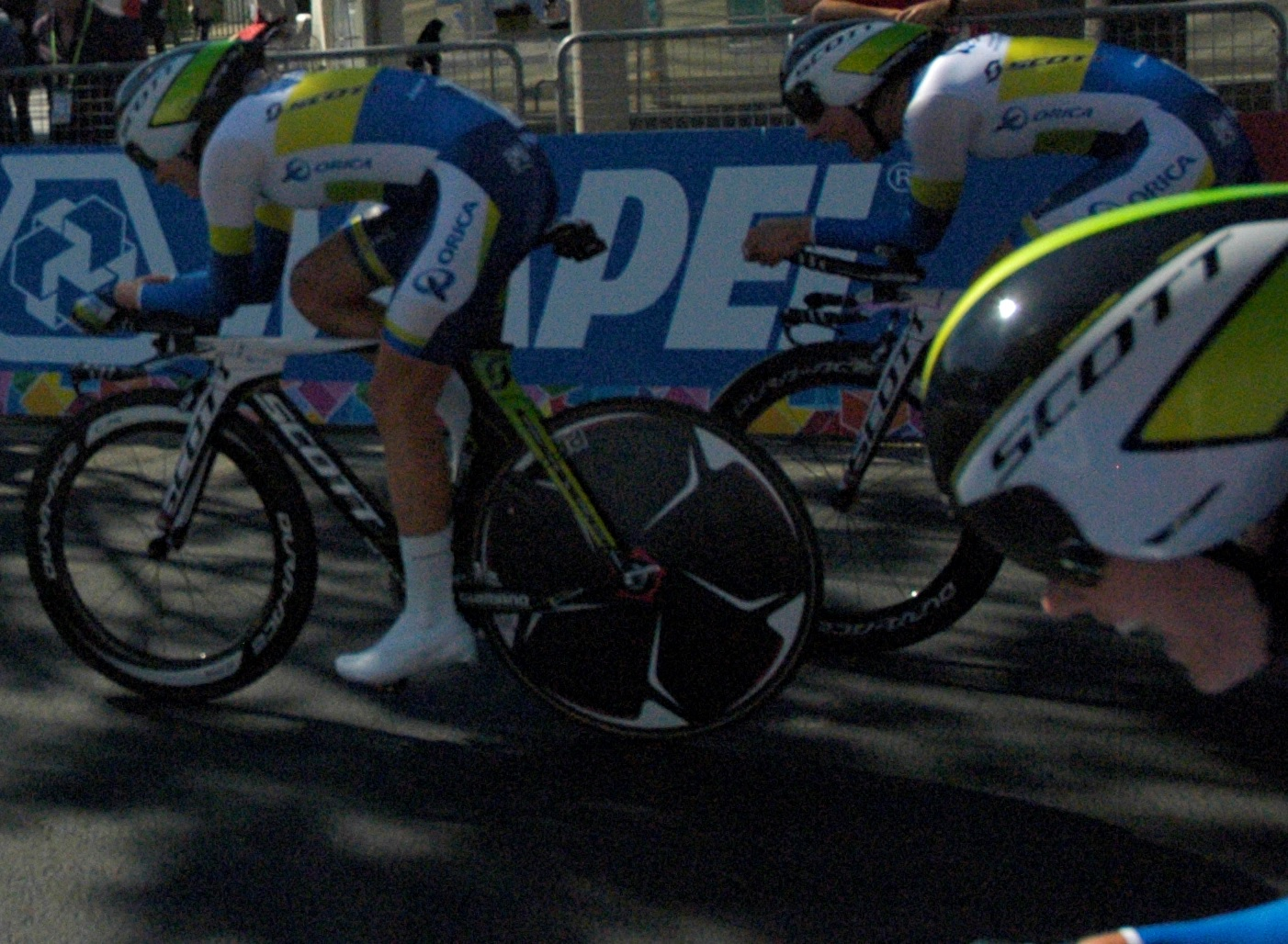
Orica–AIS

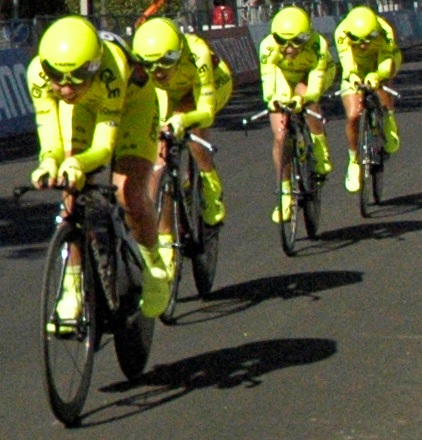
MCipollini–Giordana

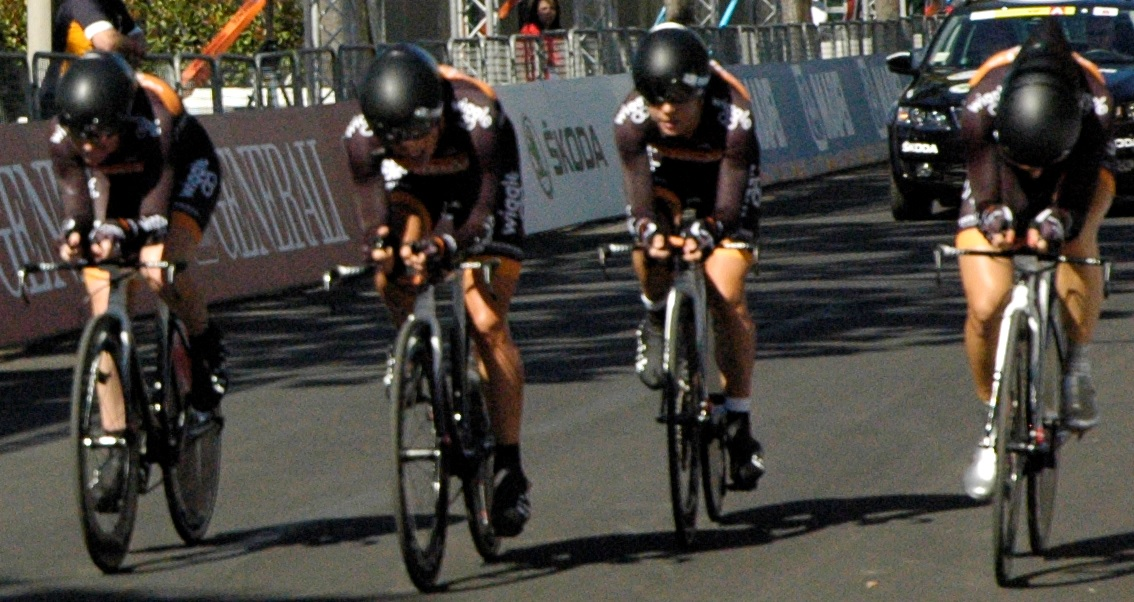
Wiggle–Honda

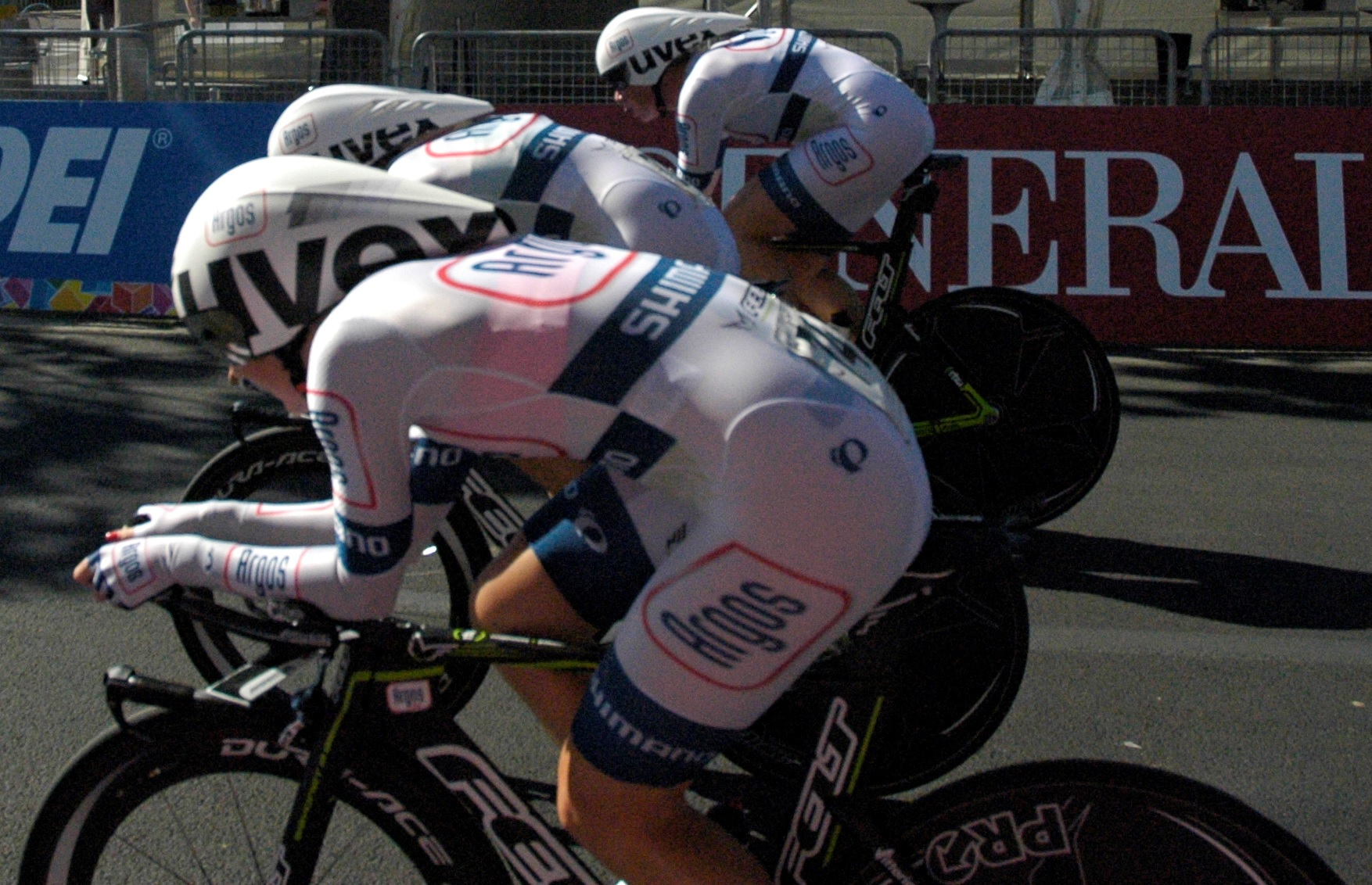
Team Argos–Shimano

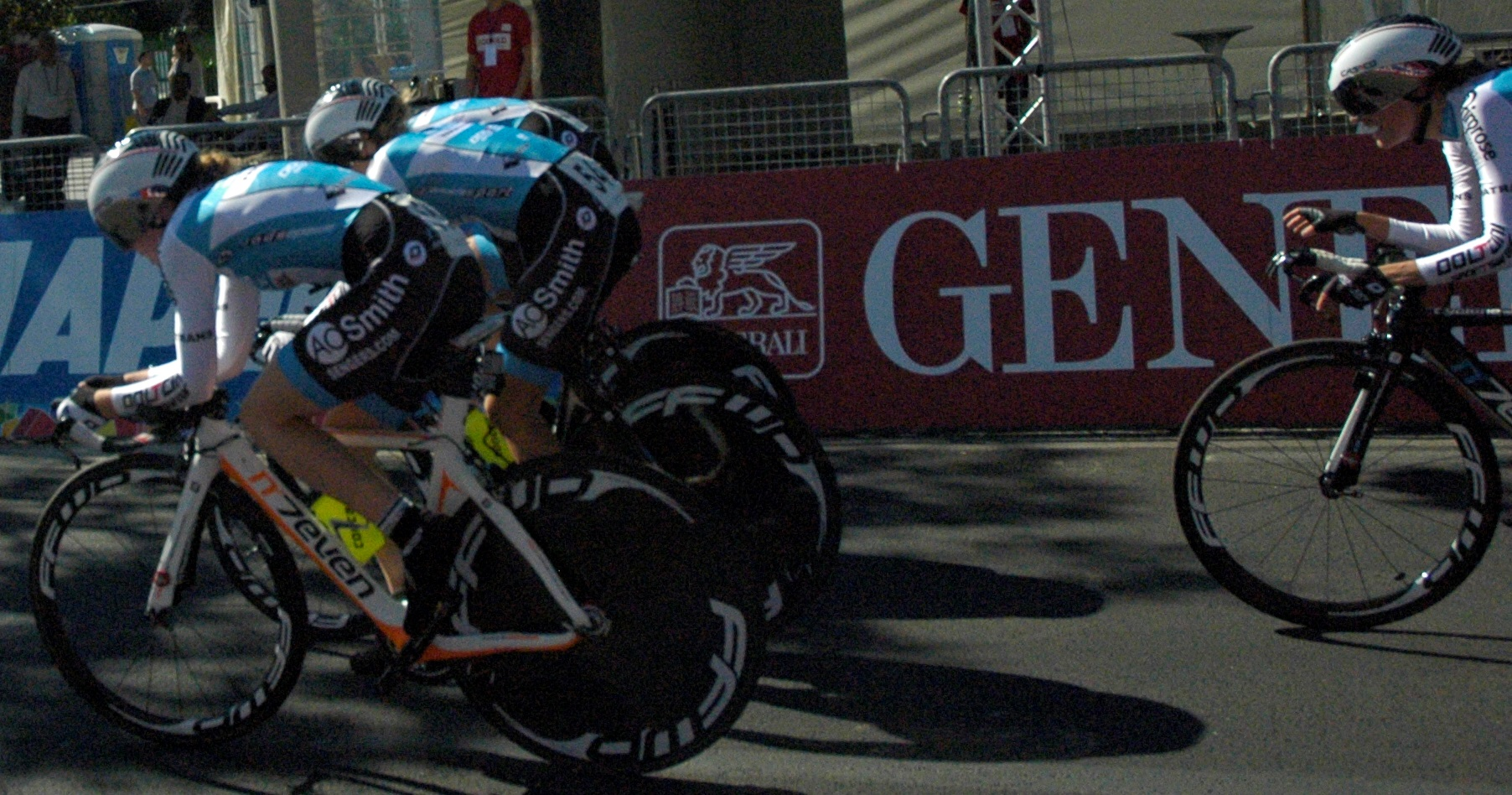
Sengers Ladies Cycling Team

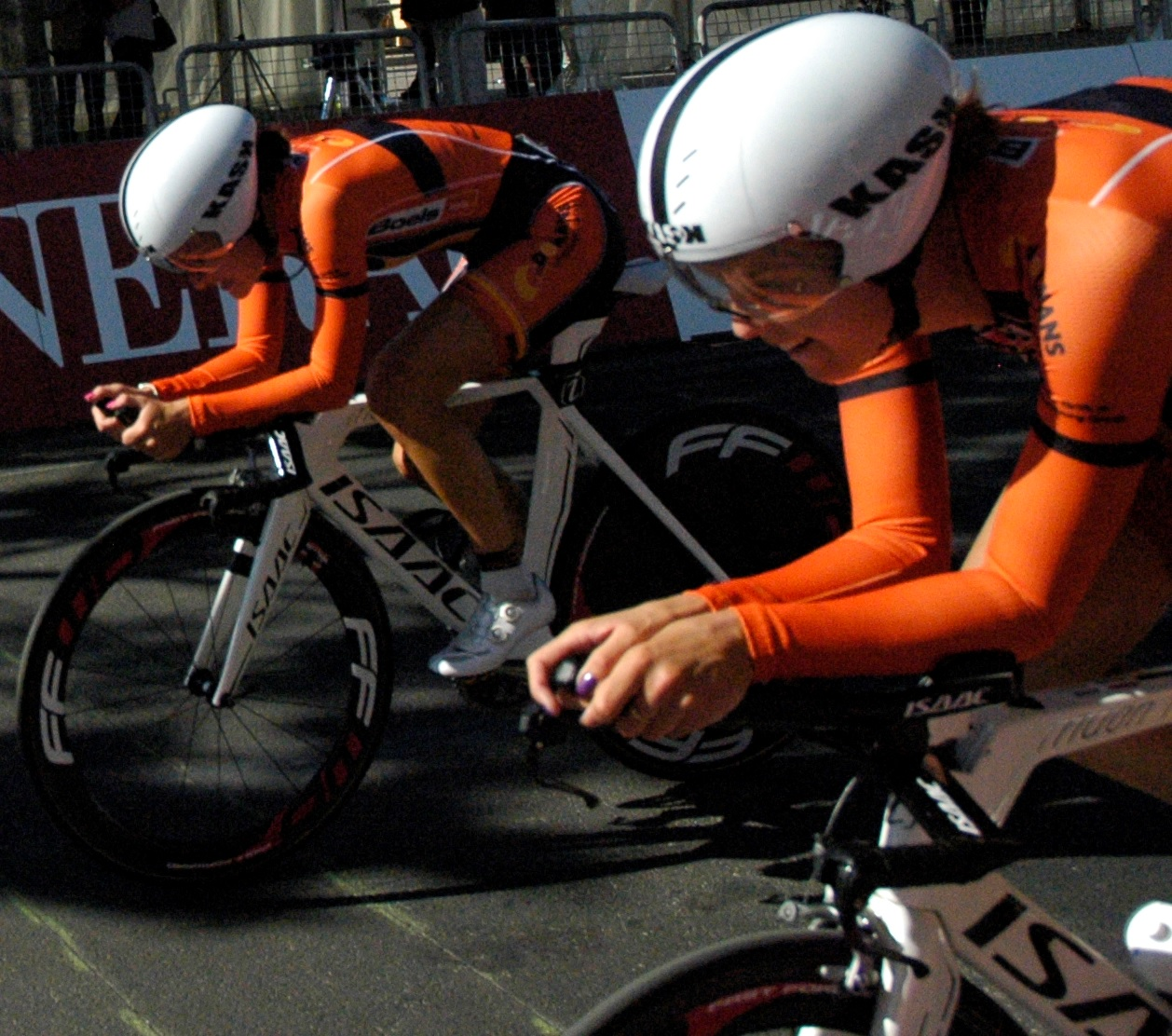
Boels–Dolmans Cycling Team

Rank	Team	Riders	Time
1	(United States) Specialized–lululemon	Lisa Brennauer (DEU); Katie Colclough (GBR); Carmen Small (USA); Evelyn Stevens (USA); Ellen van Dijk (NED); Trixi Worrack (DEU)	51' 10.69"
2	(Netherlands) Rabobank-Liv Giant	Lucinda Brand (NED); Thalita de Jong (NED); Pauline Ferrand-Prévot (FRA); Roxane Knetemann (NED); Annemiek van Vleuten (NED); Marianne Vos (NED)	+ 1' 11.09"
3	(Australia) Orica–AIS	Annette Edmondson (AUS); Shara Gillow (AUS); Loes Gunnewijk (NED); Melissa Hoskins (AUS); Emma Johansson (SWE); Amanda Spratt (AUS)	+ 1' 33.83"
4	(Russia) RusVelo	Alexandra Burchenkova (RUS); Anastasia Chulkova (RUS); Oxana Kozonchuk (RUS); Elena Kuchinskaya (RUS); Evgenia Romanyuta (RUS); Olga Zabelinskaya (RUS)	+ 2' 02.31"
5	(Italy) MCipollini–Giordana	Tatiana Antoshina (RUS); Valentina Carretta (ITA); Tatiana Guderzo (ITA); Małgorzata Jasińska (POL); Valentina Scandolara (ITA); Marta Tagliaferro (ITA)	+ 2' 18.83"
6	(United Kingdom) Wiggle–Honda	Charlotte Becker (DEU); Emily Collins (NZL); Dani King (GBR); Lauren Kitchen (AUS); Joanna Rowsell (GBR); Linda Villumsen (NZL)	+ 2' 33.00"
7	(Netherlands) Team Argos–Shimano	Janneke Busser Kanis (NED); Elke Gebhardt (DEU); Willeke Knol (NED); Amy Pieters (NED); Esra Tromp (NED); Kirsten Wild (NED)	+ 2' 50.51"
8	(United States) Optum–Kelly Benefit Strategies	Lauren Hall (USA); Janel Holcomb (USA); Leah Kirchmann (CAN); Joëlle Numainville (CAN); Denise Ramsden (CAN); Jade Wilcoxson (USA)	+ 3' 03.44"
9	(Belgium) Sengers Ladies Cycling Team	Sofie De Vuyst (BEL); Vera Koedooder (NED); Maaike Polspoel (BEL); Julia Soek (NED); Anna van der Breggen (NED)	+ 3' 05.80"
10	(Netherlands) Boels–Dolmans Cycling Team	Lizzie Armitstead (GBR); Jessie Daams (BEL); Romy Kasper (DEU); Nina Kessler (NED); Emma Trott (GBR); Adrie Visser (NED)	+ 3' 33.70"
11	(Italy) Be Pink	Noemi Cantele (ITA); Simona Frapporti (ITA); Dalia Muccioli (ITA); Doris Schweizer (SUI); Silvia Valsecchi (ITA); Małgorzata Wojtyra (POL)	+ 3' 48.49"
12	(Italy) S.C. Michela Fanini-Rox	Aude Biannic (FRA); Mireia Epelde (ESP); Jutatip Maneephan (THA); Edwige Pitel (FRA); Liisi Rist (EST); Lara Vieceli (ITA)	+ 4' 34.18"
13	(Norway) Hitec Products UCK	Emilia Fahlin (SWE); Cecilie Gotaas Johnsen (NOR); Julie Leth (DEN); Elisa Longo Borghini (ITA); Rossella Ratto (ITA); Thea Thorsen (NOR)	+ 4' 38.50"
14	(Belgium) Lotto–Belisol Ladies	Marijn de Vries (NED); Jolien D'Hoore (BEL); Ann-Sophie Duyck (BEL); Sharon Laws (GBR); Carlee Taylor (AUS); Céline Van Severen (BEL)	+ 4' 46.14"
15	(Italy) Faren Kuota	Elena Cecchini (ITA); Maria Giulia Confalonieri (ITA); Christel Ferrier-Bruneau (FRA); Giuseppina Grassi (MEX); Carolina Rodríguez (MEX); Patricia Schwager (SUI)	+ 5' 27.38"
16	(Italy) Vaiano Fondriest	Valentina Bastianelli (ITA); Alessandra D'Ettorre (ITA); Barbara Guarischi (ITA); Sérika Gulumá (COL); Kataržina Sosna (LTU); Chiara Vannucci (ITA)	+ 5' 30.87"
