= Gleb Karpenko =

Estonian cyclist (born 2001)

Personal information
- Born: 27 October 2001 (age 24) Narva-Jõesuu, Estonia
- Height: 187 cm (6 ft 2 in)
- Weight: 77 kg (170 lb)

Cycling career
- Sport: Cycling
- Current team: Quick Pro Team
- Discipline: Road
- Role: Rider

Amateur teams
- 2019: Kalevi Jalgrattakool
- 2022: Vigo–Rias Baixas

Professional teams
- 2020–2021: Tartu2024–BalticChainCycling.com
- 2023: Matériel-vélo.com
- 2024–: Ferei Quick-Panda Podium Mongolia Team

Major wins
- National Road Championship – Time Trial (2020)

Gleb Karpenko (born 27 October 2001) is an Estonian cyclist, who currently rides for UCI Continental team Quick Pro Team.

== Major results ==
2018
2nd Time trial, National Junior Road Championships
2019
National Junior Road Championships

1st Time trial
3rd Road race

1st Overall Sint-Martinusprijs Kontich

1st Stage 3a (ITT)

1st Stage 3 La Coupe du President de la Ville de Grudziądz
5th Time trial, European Junior Road Championships
2020
1st Time trial, National Road Championships
2021
2nd Road race, National Under-23 Road Championships
2022
National Under-23 Road Championships

1st Road race
2nd Time trial

3rd Overall Orlen Nations Grand Prix
2023
2nd Time trial, National Road Championships
3rd Road race, National Under-23 Road Championships
