= Rene Mandri =

Estonian road bicycle racer

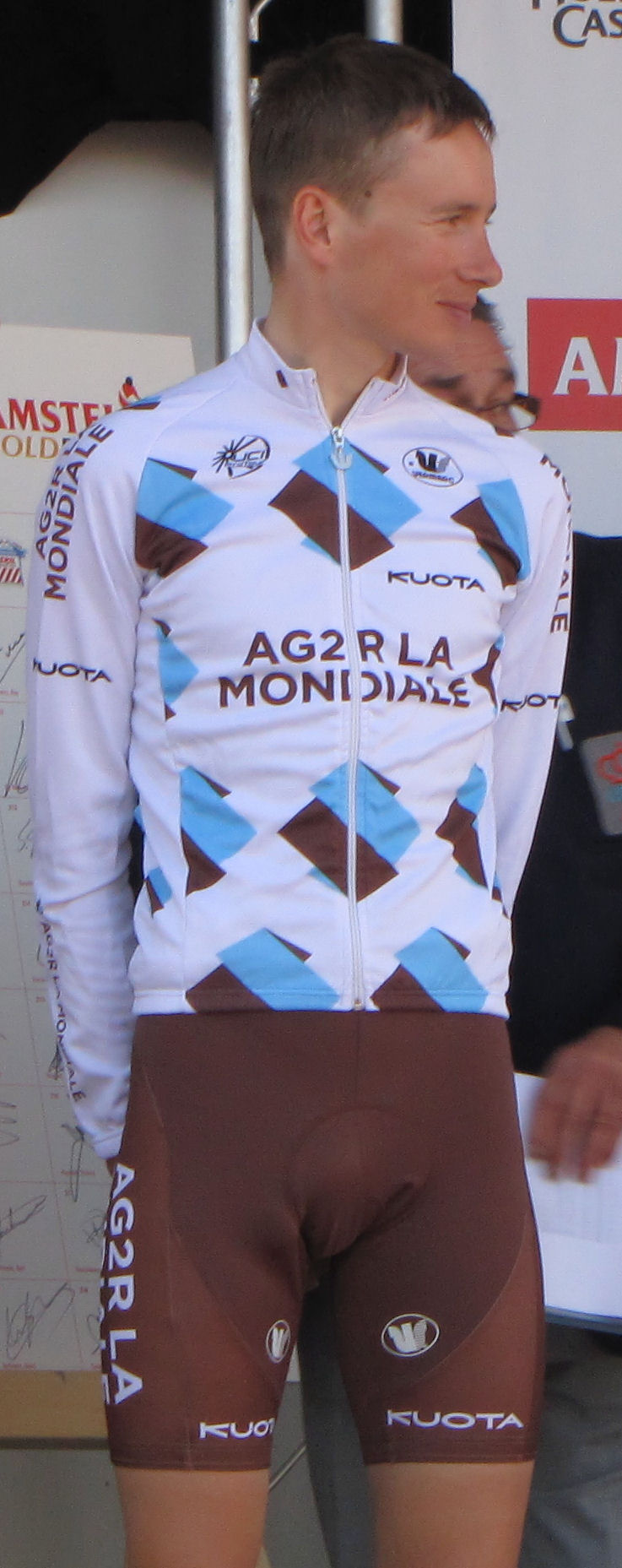

Personal information
- Full name: Rene Mandri
- Nickname: Manner
- Born: 20 January 1984 (age 42) Jõgeva, then part of Estonian SSR, Soviet Union
- Height: 1.85 m (6 ft 1 in)
- Weight: 66 kg (146 lb)

Cycling career
- Sport: Cycling
- Current team: NSN Cycling Team
- Discipline: Road
- Role: Rider (retired); Team manager; Directeur sportif
- Rider type: All-rounder

Amateur teams
- 1996–1999: Kona–Centrum
- 2000–2002: U
- 2003: AC Val d'Oise
- 2004: Tarbes Pyrénées
- 2005: EC Saint-Étienne Loire
- 2005: AG2R Prévoyance (stagiaire)
- 2013–2014: Probikeshop–EC Saint-Étienne Loire

Professional teams
- 2006: Auber 93
- 2007–2010: AG2R Prévoyance
- 2011–2012: Endura Racing

Managerial teams
- 2014: Rietumu–Delfin
- 2020–2022: Tartu2024–BalticChainCycling.com
- 2023–: Israel–Premier Tech

Major wins
- Tartu GP (2012)

Rene Mandri (born 20 January 1984 in Jõgeva) is an Estonian former professional road bicycle racer, who competed as a professional between 2006 and 2012, with the Auber 93, Ag2r–La Mondiale and Endura Racing teams. He had a life-threatening crash in 2008 Giro d'Italia Stage 6. He has been working as cycling coach since 2014 and he is a recognized Sports Organisation Leader in Estonia with an IOC diploma. He created Cycling Tartu, a club to develop cycling in the Baltics. and was the U23 coach in Estonian Cyclists Union.

He now works as a directeur sportif for UCI ProTeam NSN Cycling Team. He previously worked as a team manager for UCI Continental team Voltas–Tartu 2024 by CCN. He expressed his regret that protesters against the Israeli–Palestinian conflict hindered his team's ability to participate in Giro dell'Emilia.

== Major results ==
2005
1st Time trial, National Under-23 Road Championships
2006
1st Trophée Luc Leblanc
2nd U23 Road race, UEC European Under-23 Road Championships
2007
24th Milano- San Remo
24th Vuelta Espana

6th Stage 2 & 3
9th Stage 5

28th Elite Road Race World Championships
2011
2nd Overall Tour de Bretagne

1st Stage 2

2nd Tartu GP
2012
1st Tartu GP
1st Stage 3 Vuelta Ciclista a León
2013
3rd Overall Rhône-Alpes Isère Tour
5th Overall Baltic Chain Tour
