= Rait Ärm =

Estonian cyclist

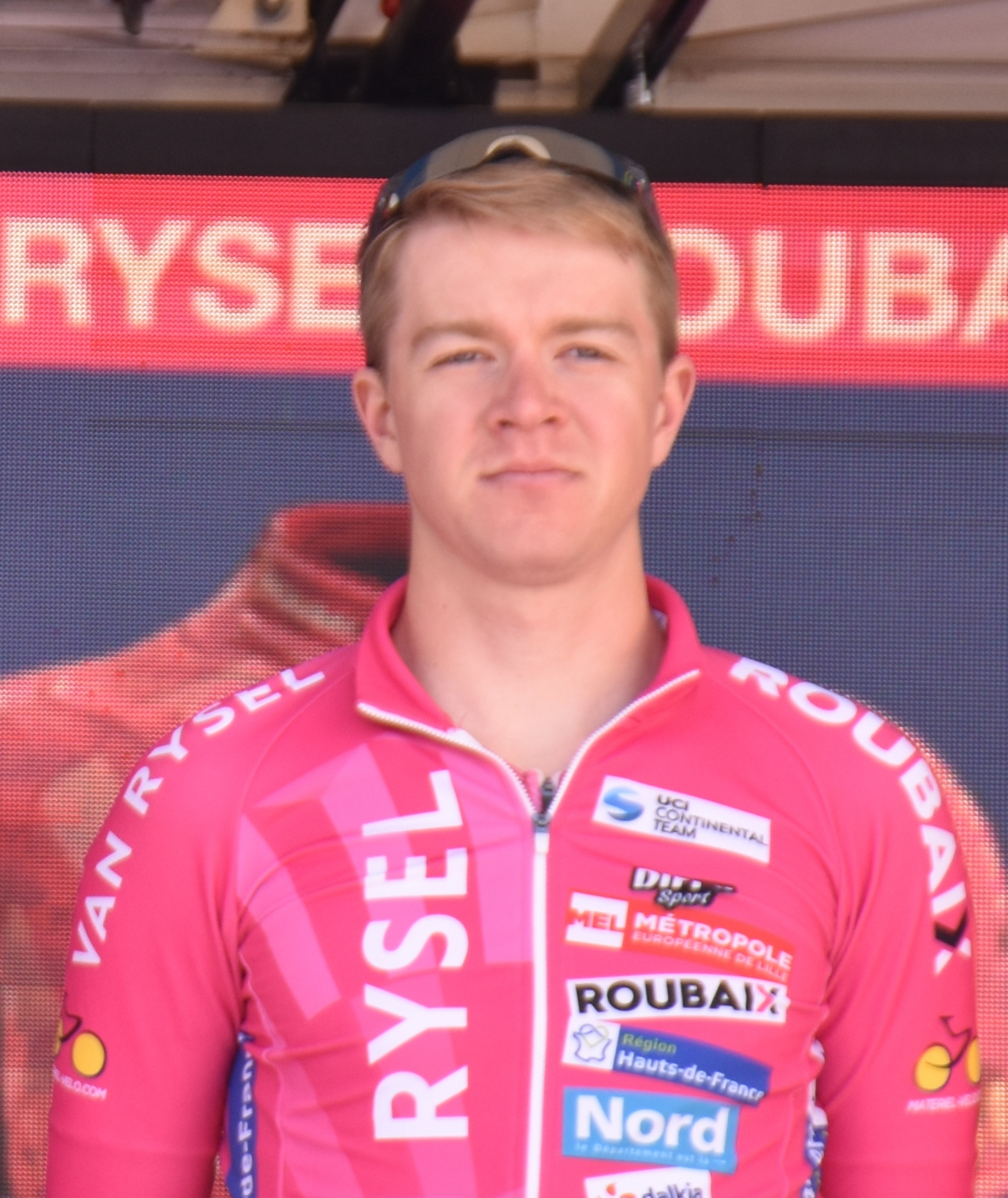
- Ärm at the 2025 Four Days of Dunkirk

Personal information
- Full name: Rait Ärm
- Born: 31 March 2000 (age 26) Saku, Estonia
- Height: 1.85 m (6 ft 1 in)
- Weight: 75 kg (165 lb)

Cycling career
- Sport: Cycling
- Current team: Van Rysel–Roubaix
- Discipline: Road
- Role: Rider

Amateur team
- 2019: Cycling Tartu

Professional teams
- 2020: Tartu2024–BalticChainCycling.com
- 2021–2022: Équipe Continentale Groupama–FDJ
- 2023–: Go Sport–Roubaix–Lille Métropole
Medal record
Representing Estonia
Men's road bicycle racing
European Championships
Bronze medal – third place	2019 Alkmaar	Under-23 road race

Rait Ärm (born 31 March 2000) is an Estonian road cyclist, who currently rides for UCI Continental team Van Rysel–Roubaix. He finished 3rd in the under-23 road race at the 2019 European Road Championships.

== Major results ==
2019
2nd Kalmar Grand Prix
3rd Road race, UEC European Under-23 Road Championships
6th Puchar Ministra Obrony Narodowej
6th Korona Kocich Gór
9th Grand Prix Minsk
2020
2nd Time trial, National Road Championships
3rd Overall Baltic Chain Tour

1st Young rider classification
1st Stage 2

10th Umag Trophy
2021
1st Road race, National Under-23 Road Championships
5th Time trial, National Road Championships
10th Grote Prijs Jean-Pierre Monseré
2022
1st Overall Baltic Chain Tour

1st Young rider classification
1st Stage 1

1st Grand Prix de la Somme
2nd Grand Prix de la ville de Pérenchies
3rd Time trial, National Under-23 Road Championships
2023
1st Overall Baltic Chain Tour

1st Stage 1

1st Grand Prix de la ville de Pérenchies
1st Tallinna Rahvasõit
National Road Championships

4th Road race
4th Time trial

2024
3rd Overall Tour of Estonia
3rd Omloop van het Waasland
4th Road race, National Road Championships
6th Overall Tour d'Eure-et-Loir
2025
1st Overall Baltic Chain Tour

1st Stages 1a (TTT) & 2

1st Otepää GP
2nd Time trial, National Road Championships
3rd Grand Prix de la ville de Pérenchies
