= Michela Balducci =

Italian cyclist (born 1995)

Personal information
- Full name: Michela Balducci
- Born: 30 March 1995 (age 31)

Cycling career
- Sport: Cycling
- Current team: Retired
- Discipline: Road
- Role: Rider

Professional teams
- 2014–2016: S.C. Michela Fanini Rox
- 2017: Giusfredi–Bianchi
- 2018–2020: Aromitalia Vaiano
- 2020–2021: Top Girls Fassa Bortolo

Michela Balducci (born 30 March 1995) is an Italian professional racing cyclist, who last for UCI Women's Continental Team Top Girls Fassa Bortolo.

She rode in the 2014 Giro d'Italia Femminile on the S.C. Michela Fanini Rox team, finishing in 130th place.

== Major results ==
2011
2nd Road race, National Novice Road Championships
2017
7th GP Liberazione
2018
9th Gran Premio Bruno Beghelli Internazionale Donne Elite
2019
7th Gent–Wevelgem
