= Lara Vieceli =

Italian cyclist

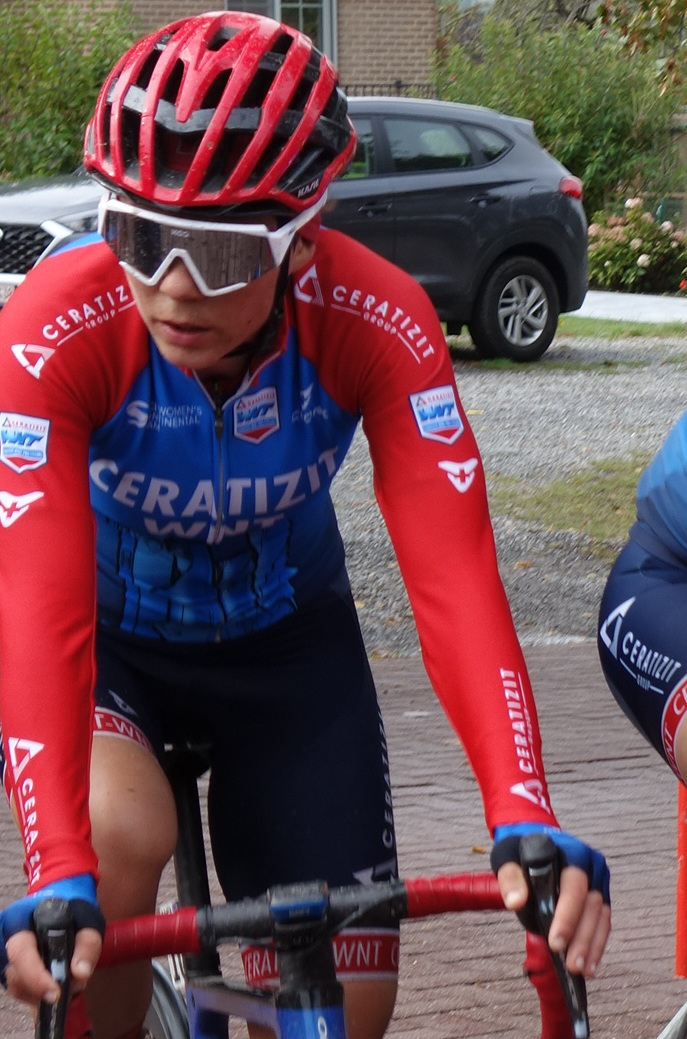
- Vieceli at the 2020 La Flèche Wallonne Féminine

Personal information
- Full name: Lara Vieceli
- Born: 16 July 1993 (age 33) Feltre, Italy

Cycling career
- Sport: Cycling
- Discipline: Road
- Role: Rider
- Rider type: All-rounder

Professional teams
- 2012: Verinlegno–Fabiani
- 2013–2015: S.C. Michela Fanini Rox
- 2016: Inpa–Bianchi
- 2017–2018: Astana
- 2019–2022: WNT–Rotor Pro Cycling
- 2023: Israel Premier Tech Roland

Lara Vieceli (born 16 July 1993) is a former Italian racing cyclist, who last rode for UCI Women's WorldTeam Israel Premier Tech Roland. She competed in the 2013 UCI women's team time trial in Florence.

== Major results ==
2015
3rd Giro del Trentino Alto Adige-Südtirol
10th Overall Trophée d'Or Féminin

1st Young rider classification

2016
4th Overall Giro della Toscana Int. Femminile – Memorial Michela Fanini

1st Mountains classification

7th Overall Tour de Bretagne Féminin

1st Prologue

10th Overall Trophée d'Or Féminin
2017
5th SwissEver GP Cham-Hagendorn
7th Overall Setmana Ciclista Valenciana
2018
6th SwissEver GP Cham-Hagendorn
2019
4th Grand Prix International d'Isbergues
