= Azzurra D'Intino =

Italian cyclist (born 1991)

Personal information
- Born: 25 October 1991 (age 34)

Cycling career
- Sport: Cycling
- Role: Rider

Azzurra D'Intino (born 25 October 1991) is an Italian professional racing cyclist. She rides for the S.C. Michela Fanini Rox team.

== See also ==
- List of 2015 UCI Women's Teams and riders
