= Reyhaneh Khatouni =

Iranian cyclist

Personal information
- Born: 12 May 1993 (age 33)

Cycling career
- Sport: Cycling
- Discipline: Road
- Role: Rider

Major wins
- One-day races and Classics National Road Race Championships (2015) National Time Trial Championships (2015)
Medal record
Representing Iran
Women's road cycling
Asian Championships
Bronze medal – third place	2022 Dushanbe	Team time trial

Reyhaneh Khatouni (Persian: ریحانه خاتونی; born 12 May 1993) is an Iranian racing cyclist. In 2015, she won both the Iranian National Road Race Championships and the Iranian National Time Trial Championships.

== See also ==
- 2015 national road cycling championships
