= Grand Prix de la ville de Pérenchies =

French bicycle race

Race details
- Date: July
- Region: Pérenchies, France
- Discipline: Road race
- Competition: UCI Europe Tour
- Type: One day race

History
- First edition: 1977
- Editions: 49 (as of 2026)
- First winner: Christian Sobota (FRA)
- Most wins: Christian Sobota (FRA); Grégory Barbier (FRA); (2 wins)
- Most recent: Maxime Jarnet (FRA)

The Grand Prix de la ville de Pérenchies is a road bicycle race held annually in France. It is organized as a 1.2 event on the UCI Europe Tour.

== Winners ==
Year	Winner	Second	Third
1977	(France) Christian Sobota	(France) Guy Leuleu	(France) Jacques Osmont
1978	(France) Claude Babeye	(France) Michel Cornelise	(France) Gilles Mahé
1979	(France) Fabrice Fournier	(France) Alain Deloeuil	(France) Christian Lucas
1980	(France) Guy Craz	(France) Didier Echivard	(France) Alain Deloeuil
1981	(France) Philippe Saude	(France) Jacques Dutailly	(France) Michel Zucarelli
1982	(France) Jean-Philippe Pipart	(France) Christian Leduc	(France) Dominique Dezegue
1983	(France) Christian Sobota	(France) Gilles Lorgnier	(France) Thierry Barrault
1984	(France) Mario Degouge	(Netherlands) Jos Fevers	(Netherlands) Corné Heeren
1984	(Netherlands) Peter Hofland	(New Zealand) Nathan Dahlberg	(France) Vincent Thorey
1986	(France) Bertrand Zielonka	(France) Philippe Brenner	(Republic of Ireland) Stephen Delaney
1987	(France) Alain Parisot	(France) Jean-François Morio	(France) Vincent Thorey
1988	(France) P. Roussel	(France) Francis Moreau	(France) Fabrice Debrabant
1989	(France) Gérard Picard	(France) Gérard Henriet	(France) Bruno Huger
1990	(France) Eddy Seigneur	(Poland) Stanislaw Saczuk	(France) Jean-Paul Legouverneur
1991	(Estonia) Lauri Resik	(France) Laurent Davion	(France) Anthony Rockia
1992	(Poland) Klaudiusz Migdol	(France) Jacques Dutailly	(France) Philippe Duhamel
1993	(France) Jean-Michel Thilloy	(France) Pascal Popieul	(France) Anthony Rockia
1994	(France) David Lefèvre	(France) Anthony Rockia	(France) Franck Lemaire
1995	(France) Grégory Barbier	(France) Tony Facon	(France) Didier Faivre-Pierret
1996	(France) Grégory Barbier	(France) Yannick Luccini	(France) Sébastien Hatton
1997	(France) Pascal Carlot	(France) Eric Beaune	(France) Arnaud Auguste
1998	(France) Jean-Michel Thilloy	(Kazakhstan) Oleg Kozlitine	(France) Jean-Claude Thilloy
1999	(France) Jean-Claude Thilloy	(France) Carlo Meneghetti	(France) Fabrice Debrabant
2000	(New Zealand) Gordon McCauley	(Belgium) Wouter Demeulemeester	(France) Fabrice Debrabant
2001	(France) Olivier Grammaire	(Belgium) Geert Van Crombruggen	(France) Fabrice Paumier
2002	(France) Geoffroy Lequatre	(Australia) David McKenzie	(France) Stéphane Pétilleau
2003	(France) Marc Chamoine	(France) Romain Mary	(France) Nicolas Paris
2004	(Colombia) Leonardo Duque	(France) Aziz Immouni	(Belgium) Peter Ronsse
2005	(Lithuania) Aivaras Baranauskas	(Belgium) Michael Blanchy	(Belgium) Sven Nys
2006	(France) Tony Cavet	(France) Fabrice Debrabant	(France) Anthony Jaunet
2007	(Belgium) Peter Ronsse	(Belarus) Yauheni Hutarovich	(Sweden) Håkan Nilsson
2008	(Belgium) Steven De Neef	(France) Florian Guillou	(Sweden) Håkan Nilsson
2009	(Germany) Robert Retschke	(Belgium) Jürgen François	(Germany) Frank Dressler-Lehnhof
2010	(France) Arnaud Démare	(France) Adrien Petit	(Denmark) Philip Nielsen
2011	(France) Anthony Colin	(France) Romain Delalot	(France) Morgan Kneisky
2012	(New Zealand) Rico Rogers	(France) Morgan Kneisky	(New Zealand) Alexander Meenhorst
2013	(France) Melvin Rullière	(France) Pierre Drancourt	(France) Jimmy Turgis
2014	(Belgium) Gaëtan Bille	(Belgium) Olivier Pardini	(Latvia) Janis Dakteris
2015	(Belgium) Dimitri Claeys	(Belgium) Joeri Calleeuw	(Netherlands) Stan Godrie
2016	(Belgium) Timothy Dupont	(France) Rudy Barbier	(France) Julien Van Haverbeke
2017	(Belgium) Roy Jans	(Australia) Cameron Bayly	(Netherlands) Bram Welten
2018	(Belgium) Kenny Dehaes	(Belgium) Emiel Vermeulen	(France) Romain Feillu
2019	(Belgium) Jens Reynders	(France) Jason Tesson	(Belgium) Robin Stenuit
2020	No race
2021	(Belgium) Emiel Vermeulen	(Belgium) Simon Daniels	(France) Damien Ridel
2022	(New Zealand) Laurence Pithie	(Estonia) Rait Ärm	(South Africa) Morné Van Niekerk
2023	(Estonia) Rait Ärm	(South Africa) Morné Van Niekerk	(Belgium) Dylan Vandenstorme
2024	(France) Théo Delacroix	(Belgium) Steffen De Schuyteneer	(France) Maxime Jarnet
2025	(Belgium) Toon Vandebosch	(Netherlands) Keije Solen	(Estonia) Rait Ärm
2026	(France) Maxime Jarnet	(France) Alexis Pierre	(France) Quentin Bezza
