= Estonian National Time Trial Championships =

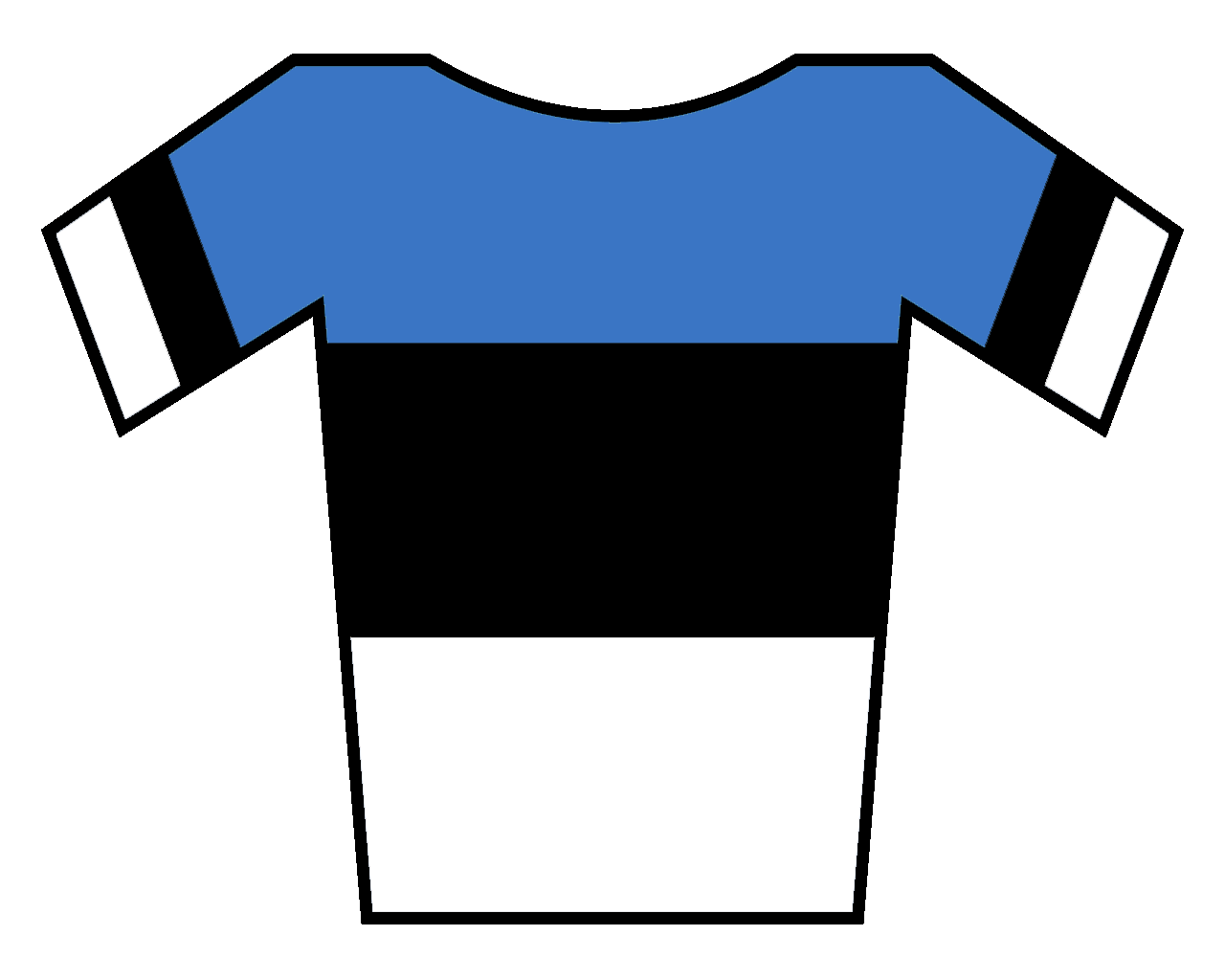
The champion's jersey

The Estonian National Time Trial Championship is a time trial race that takes place inside the Estonian National Cycling Championship, and decides the best cyclist in this type of race. The first edition took place in 1997. The first race winner of the time trial championship was Urmo Fuchs in 1997. Jaan Kirsipuu and Rein Taaramäe hold the joint record for the most wins in the men's championship with 9, and the women's record is held by Liisi Rist with 7 wins. The current champions are Rein Taaramäe and Laura Lizette Sander.

== Multiple winners ==
Men

Wins	Name	Years
9	Jaan Kirsipuu	1998, 1999, 2001, 2002, 2003, 2004, 2005, 2006, 2007
9	Rein Taaramäe	2009, 2011, 2012, 2019, 2021, 2022, 2023, 2024, 2025
4	Tanel Kangert	2008, 2010, 2013, 2018
3	Gert Jõeäär	2014, 2015, 2016

Women

Wins	Name	Years
7	Liisi Rist	2013, 2014, 2015, 2016, 2017, 2018, 2019
6	Grete Treier	2006, 2007, 2008, 2010, 2011, 2012
3	Laura Lizette Sander	2023, 2024, 2025
2	Mari-Liis Mõttus	2020, 2021

== Men ==
=== Elite ===
Estonian National Time Trial Championships – Men's elite time trial
Race details
- Region: Estonia
- Discipline: Road bicycle racing
- Type: One-day

History
- First edition: 1997
- First winner: Urmo Fuchs
- Most wins: Jaan Kirsipuu and Rein Taaramäe (9 wins)
- Most recent: Rein Taaramäe

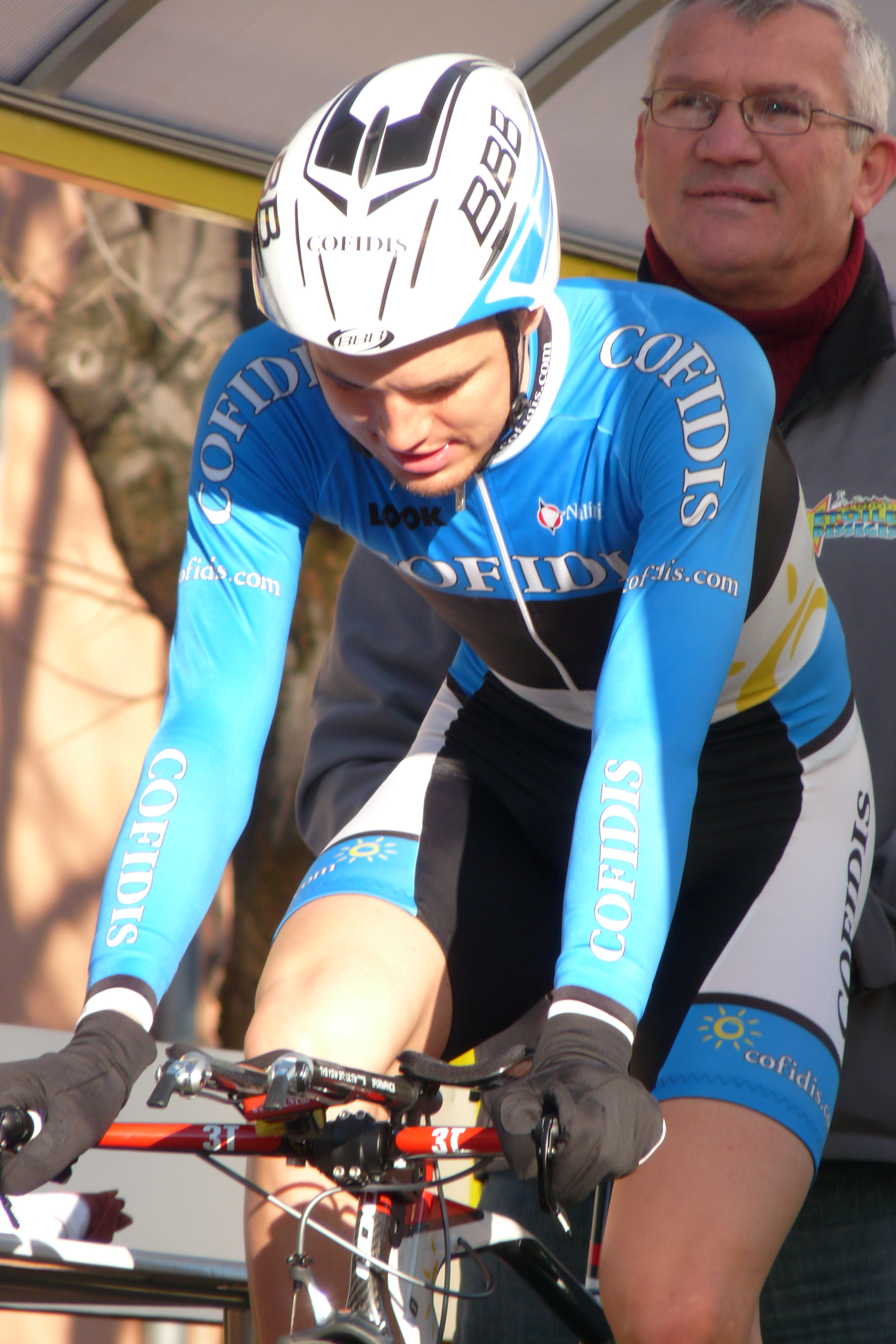
Rein Taaramäe has won nine titles.

Year	Gold	Silver	Bronze
1997	Urmo Fuchs	Oskari Kargu	Indrek Otsus
1998	Jaan Kirsipuu	Lauri Aus	Margus Salumets
1999	Jaan Kirsipuu	Allan Oras	Markku Ainsalu
2000	Lauri Aus	Jaan Kirsipuu	Allan Oras
2001	Jaan Kirsipuu	Markku Ainsalu	Andre Aduson
2002	Jaan Kirsipuu	Margus Salumets	Oskari Kargu
2003	Jaan Kirsipuu	Lauri Aus	Janek Tombak
2004	Jaan Kirsipuu	Markku Ainsalu	Tarmo Raudsepp
2005	Jaan Kirsipuu	Tarmo Raudsepp	Andre Aduson
2006	Jaan Kirsipuu	Tarmo Raudsepp	Andre Aduson
2007	Jaan Kirsipuu	Rein Taaramäe	Priit Prous
2008	Tanel Kangert	Allan Oras	Andre Aduson
2009	Rein Taaramäe	Ervin Korts-Laur	Gert Jõeäär
2010	Tanel Kangert	Ervin Korts-Laur	Gert Jõeäär
2011	Rein Taaramäe	Gert Jõeäär	Mart Ojavee
2012	Rein Taaramäe	Tanel Kangert	Rene Mandri
2013	Tanel Kangert	Rein Taaramäe	Gert Jõeäär
2014	Gert Jõeäär	Alo Jakin	Oskar Nisu
2015	Gert Jõeäär	Silver Mäoma	Timmo Jeret
2016	Gert Jõeäär	Silver Mäoma	Ivo Suur
2017	Silver Mäoma	Gert Jõeäär	Norman Vahtra
2018	Tanel Kangert	Alo Jakin	Norman Vahtra
2019	Rein Taaramäe	Karl Patrick Lauk	Oskar Nisu
2020	Gleb Karpenko	Rait Ärm	Markus Pajur
2021	Rein Taaramäe	Norman Vahtra	Artjom Mirzojev
2022	Rein Taaramäe	Tanel Kangert	Norman Vahtra
2023	Rein Taaramäe	Gleb Karpenko	Norman Vahtra
2024	Rein Taaramäe	Norman Vahtra	Taavi Kannimäe
2025	Rein Taaramäe	Rait Ärm	Norman Vahtra

=== U23 ===
Year	Gold	Silver	Bronze
2005	Rene Mandri	Kalle Kriit	Mihkel Reile
2006	Rein Taaramäe	Mihkel Reile	Gert Jõeäär
2007	Rein Taaramäe		
2008	Gert Jõeäär	Ervin Korts-Laur	Martin Puusepp
2009	Rein Taaramäe	Gert Jõeäär	
2010	Martin Puusepp	Urmo Utar	Karlo Aia
2011	Karlo Aia	Ivo Suur	Gabriel Leppik
2012	Karlo Aia	Siim Alamaa	Risto Raid
2013	Timmo Jeret	Endrik Puntso	Martin Laas
2014	Oskar Nisu	Timmo Jeret	Endrik Puntso
2015	Silver Mäoma	Timmo Jeret	Oskar Nisu
2016	Silver Mäoma	Oskar Nisu	Karl Patrick Lauk
2017	Silver Mäoma	Norman Vahtra	Peeter Pung
2018	Norman Vahtra	Karl Patrick Lauk	Arthur Kooser
2019	Karl Patrick Lauk	Arthur Kooser	Joosep Sankmann
2020	Gleb Karpenko	Rait Ärm	Markus Pajur
2021	Artjom Köster	Joonas Kurits	Rait Ärm
2022	Joonas Kurits	Gleb Karpenko	Rait Ärm

== Women ==
=== Elite ===
Estonian National Time Trial Championships – Women's elite time trial
Race details
- Region: Estonia
- Discipline: Road bicycle racing
- Type: One-day

History
- First edition: 2006
- First winner: Grete Treier
- Most wins: Liisi Rist (7 wins)
- Most recent: Laura Lizette Sander

Year	Gold	Silver	Bronze
2006	Grete Treier	Kata-Liina Normak	Laura Lepasalu
2007	Grete Treier	Kata-Liina Normak	Laura Lepasalu
2008	Grete Treier	Laura Lepasalu	Liisa Ehrberg
2009	Liisa Ehrberg	Maaris Meier	Laura Lepasalu
2010	Grete Treier	Liisa Ehrberg	Ivika Lainevee
2011	Grete Treier	Alma Sarapuu	Viktoria Randalainen
2012	Grete Treier	Liisi Rist	Viktoria Randalainen
2013	Liisi Rist	Viktoria Randalainen	Kristel Koort
2014	Liisi Rist	Inge Kool	Liisa Kull
2015	Liisi Rist	Liisa Ehrberg	Janelle Uibokand
2016	Liisi Rist	Liisa Ehrberg	Mari-Liis Mõttus
2017	Liisi Rist	Mari-Liis Mõttus	Liisa Ehrberg
2018	Liisi Rist	Egle Mätas	Mari-Liis Mõttus
2019	Liisi Rist	Egle Mätas	Mari-Liis Mõttus
2020	Mari-Liis Mõttus	Mathilde Nigul	Egle Mätas
2021	Mari-Liis Mõttus	Karmen Reinpõld	Aidi Gerde Tuisk
2022	Hanna Taaramäe	Karmen Reinpõld	Krista Karing
2023	Laura Lizette Sander	Elisabeth Ebras	Nele Ohmann
2024	Laura Lizette Sander	Elisabeth Ebras	Aidi Gerde Tuisk
2025	Laura Lizette Sander	Aidi Gerde Tuisk	Nele Ohmann
