= Laura Lepasalu =

Estonian road cyclist

Personal information
- Born: 29 July 1986 (age 40) Tartu, then part of Estonian SSR, Soviet Union

Cycling career
- Sport: Cycling
- Discipline: Road cycling

Professional team
- 2008–2009: Team Pro Féminin Les Carroz

Laura Lepasalu (born 29 July 1986) is a road cyclist from Estonia. She represented her nation at the 2007 and 2008 UCI Road World Championships.
