= S.C. Michela Fanini Rox =

Italian cycling team

Team information
- UCI code: MIC
- Registered: Italy
- Founded: 1999
- Disbanded: 2018
- Discipline: Road
- Status: UCI Women's Team
- Bicycles: Lombardo
- Website: Team home page

Team name history
- 1999–2010 2011–2018: SC Michela Fanini Record Rox; S.C. Michela Fanini Rox

S.C. Michela Fanini Rox (UCI team code: MIC) was a professional cycling team based in Italy, which competes in elite road bicycle racing events such as the UCI Women's Road World Cup and elite road races.

== Team history ==
=== 2014 ===
==== Riders in ====
On November 4, Eyerusalem Dino Kelin, Lara Vieceli, Michela Balducci, Frederica Nicolai and Azzurra D'Intino signed contract extensions. On November 5 Vittoria Reati joined the team. On November 13 Francesca Balducci joined the team. On December 1, Alessandra Lari signed with the team. On December 12 Laura Lozano joined the team.

==== Riders out ====
On November 13 Vittoria Bussi left the team to join Servetto Footon.

== Team roster ==
Rider	Date of birth
Francesca Balducci (ITA)	1 May 1996 (age 30)
Sara Barbieri (ITA)	28 June 1991 (age 35)
Anna Ceoloni (ITA)	8 October 1991 (age 34)
Lilibeth Chacón (VEN)	1 March 1992 (age 34)
Alessia Dal Magro (ITA)	21 August 1998 (age 28)
Elisa Dalla Valle (ITA)	16 January 1998 (age 28)

Rider	Date of birth
Leonora Geppi (ITA)	9 December 1999 (age 26)
Mónika Király (HUN)	10 November 1983 (age 42)
Greta Marturano (ITA)	14 June 1998 (age 28)
Olga Shekel (UKR)	28 May 1994 (age 32)
Yevgenia Vysotska (UKR)	11 December 1975 (age 50)

== Previous squads ==
=== 2014 ===
As of January 8, 2014.

Rider	Date of birth
Michela Balducci (ITA)	July 30, 1995 (age 31)
Vittoria Bussi (ITA)	March 19, 1987 (age 39)
Simona Crotti (ITA)	August 16, 1995 (age 31)
Azzurra D'Intino (ITA)	October 25, 1991 (age 34)
Mireia Epelde (ESP)	January 6, 1987 (age 39)

Rider	Date of birth
Edwige Pitel (FRA)	June 4, 1967 (age 59)
Liisi Rist (EST)	June 25, 1991 (age 35)
Lara Vieceli (ITA)	July 16, 1993 (age 33)
Yevheniya Vysotska (UKR)	December 11, 1975 (age 50)

=== 2013 ===
Ages as of 1 January 2013.

Rider	Date of birth
Aude Biannic (FRA)	March 27, 1991 (aged 21)
Gloria Boldrini (ITA)	February 16, 1994 (aged 18)
Carlotta Brui (ITA)	May 25, 1994 (aged 18)
Azzurra D'Intino (ITA)	October 25, 1991 (aged 21)
Mireia Epelde Bikendi (ESP)	October 29, 1985 (aged 27)
Lisa Gamba (ITA)	February 22, 1994 (aged 18)
Jutatip Maneephan (THA)	July 8, 1988 (aged 24)

Rider	Date of birth
Silvia Marsala (ITA)	June 19, 1993 (aged 19)
Edwige Pitel (FRA)	June 4, 1967 (aged 45)
Liisi Rist (EST)	June 25, 1991 (aged 21)
Grete Treier (EST)	December 12, 1977 (aged 35)
Lara Vieceli (ITA)	July 16, 1993 (aged 19)
Yevgeniya Vysotska (UKR)	December 11, 1975 (aged 37)

=== 2012 ===
Ages as of 1 January 2012.

Rider	Date of birth
Alexandra Burchenkova (RUS)	September 16, 1988 (aged 23)
Lorena Foresi (ITA)	April 11, 1988 (aged 23)
Sara Grifi (ITA)	September 26, 1988 (aged 23)
Verónica Leal Balderas (MEX)	October 15, 1977 (aged 34)
Silvia Marsala (ITA)	June 19, 1993 (aged 18)
Ella Michal (ISR)	July 24, 1987 (aged 24)

Rider	Date of birth
Vanessa Elettra Ricci (ITA)	February 4, 1989 (aged 22)
Martina Růžičková (CZE)	March 22, 1980 (aged 31)
Azucena Sánchez Benito (ESP)	October 15, 1978 (aged 33)
Valentina Scandolara (ITA)	May 1, 1990 (aged 21)
Grete Treier (EST)	December 12, 1977 (aged 34)

=== 2011 ===
Ages as of 1 January 2011.

Rider	Date of birth
Karin Aune (SWE)	April 29, 1975 (aged 35)
Chiara Ciuffini (ITA)	December 11, 1985 (aged 25)
Sara Grifi (ITA)	September 26, 1988 (aged 22)
Małgorzata Jasińska (POL)	January 18, 1984 (aged 26)
Verónica Leal Balderas (MEX)	October 15, 1977 (aged 33)
Alice Marmorini (ITA)	January 11, 1987 (aged 23)

Rider	Date of birth
Ella Michal (ISR)	July 24, 1987 (aged 23)
Nina Ovcharenko (UKR)	August 7, 1984 (aged 26)
Vanessa Elettra Ricci (ITA)	February 4, 1989 (aged 21)
Martina Růžičková (CZE)	March 22, 1980 (aged 30)
Grete Treier (EST)	December 12, 1977 (aged 33)

== Major results ==
1999
Trofeo Alfredo Binda – Comune di Cittiglio, Fany Lecourtois
2002
GP Castilla y Leon, Regina Schleicher
GP Ouest France, Regina Schleicher
2004
Stage 2 Bay Cycling Classic, Hayley Brown-Rutherford
Stage 1 Emakumeen Euskal Bira, Katia Longhin
Stage 2 Giro d'Italia Femminile, Edita Pučinskaitė
GP Carnevale d'Europa, Nicole Brändli
Overall Trophée d'Or Féminin, Edita Pučinskaitė

Stages 2 & 5, Katia Longhin
Stage 4, Edita Pučinskaitė

GP Ouest France, Edita Pučinskaitė
Stage 2Giro della Toscana Int. Femminile, Edita Pučinskaitė
2005
Stage 1 Central Valley Classic, Annette Beutler
General classification Joe Martin Stage Race, Lynn Gaggioli-Brotzman

Stage 1, Lynn Gaggioli-Brotzman

Stage 3 Tour du Grand Montréal, Annette Beutler
2006
Stages 1 & 2 Eko Tour Dookola Polski, Annalisa Cucinotta
Stage 3 Eko Tour Dookola Polski, Karin Aune
2007
Skandis GP, Sara Mustonen
Falu, Sara Mustonen
Stage 1 Tour de Pologne Feminin, Grete Treier
Stage 3 Laxå 3-dagars, Sara Mustonen
Solleröloppet, Sara Mustonen
Soldvarvi GP, Sara Mustonen
Overall Söderhamns 3-dagars, Sara Mustonen

Stages 1a, 1b & 2 part a Söderhamns 3-dagars, Sara Mustonen

2010
Stage 2 Tour Féminin en Limousin, Edwige Pitel
2011
Overall Vuelta Feminina a Guatemala, Verónica Leal Balderas

Stage 1, Verónica Leal Balderas

Overall Tour Féminin en Limousin, Grete Treier
2012
Overall Tour of Adygeya, Alexandra Burchenkova

Stage 2, Alexandra Burchenkova

2018
Horizon Park Women Challenge, Yevgenia Vysotska
Stage 5 Vuelta a Colombia Femenina, Lilibeth Chacón

== National champions ==
2007
Estonia Time Trial, Grete Treier
Estonia Road Race, Grete Treier
Sweden Road Race, Sara Mustonen
2009
Italy Road Race, Monia Baccaille
2010
Ukraine Road Race, Nina Ovcharenko
2011
Estonia Time Trial, Grete Treier
Estonia Road Race, Grete Treier
Mexico Time Trial Verónica Leal Balderas
Israel National Road Race, Ellah Michal
2012
Estonia Time Trial, Grete Treier
Estonia Road Race, Grete Treier
2013
Estonia Time Trial, Liisi Rist
Estonia Road Race, Liisi Rist
2014
Ukraine Time Trial, Tetyana Ryabchenko
Estonia Time Trial, Liisi Rist
Estonia Road Race, Liisi Rist
2015
Ethiopia Time Trial, Eyerusalem Kelil
2016
Ethiopia Time Trial, Eyerusalem Kelil
France Road Race, Edwige Pitel
Hungary Road Race, Mónika Király
Hungary Time Trial, Mónika Király
2017
Hungary Time Trial, Mónika Király
Hungary Road Race, Mónika Király
2018
Ukraine Road Race, Olga Shekel
