= Liisi Rist =

Estonian cyclist

Personal information
- Born: 25 June 1991 (age 35) Tallinn, Estonia

Cycling career
- Sport: Cycling
- Discipline: Road
- Role: Rider

Amateur team
- 2016: Keukens Redant Cycling Team

Professional teams
- 2013–2014: S.C. Michela Fanini Rox
- 2015: Inpa Sottoli Giusfredi

Major wins
- One day races & Classics National Road Race Championships (2013–2014) National Time Trial Championships (2013–2019) National Criterium Championships (2016)

Liisi Rist (born 25 June 1991) is an Estonian racing cyclist. She competed in the 2013 UCI women's team time trial in Florence. She has won the Estonian National Road Race Championships twice (2013, 2014) and the Estonian National Time Trial Championships seven times (consecutively between 2013 and 2019). In 2013 the Estonian Cycling Federation gave her the Best Female Cyclist award. She also took part at the 2015 European Games in Baku.

== Major results ==
2009
6th Road race, National Road Championships
2010
National Road Championships

4th Time trial
7th Road race

2011
National Road Championships

2nd Road race
4th Time trial

2012
National Road Championships

2nd Road race
2nd Time trial

3rd Tour de Helsinki
2013
National Road Championships

1st Time trial
1st Road race

2014
National Road Championships

1st Time trial
1st Road race

2015
National Road Championships

1st Time trial
2nd Road race

2016
National Road Championships

1st Time trial
1st Criterium

1st Viljandi Tänavasõit Criterium
2nd Ledegem
3rd Dead Sea-Scorpion Pass
5th Overall 4. NEA
5th Arava–Arad
5th Massa–Arad
8th De Klinge
2017
National Road Championships

1st Time trial
9th Road race

2018
1st Time trial, National Road Championships
2019
1st Time trial, National Road Championships
