= Indrek Otsus =

Estonian bodybuilder and cyclist

Indrek Otsus (born 14 August 1955) is an Estonian bodybuilder and cyclist.

He was born in Tartu. In 1978 he graduated from University of Tartu as a biology and chemistry teacher.

He began his bodybuilding career in 1973. He is multiple-times Estonian champion in bodybuilding. 1992–2008 he was a member of Estonian national bodybuilding team.

He is also practised sport cycling. 1995 and 1997 he won bronze medal at Estonian championships.

Since 1992 he is working as a bodybuilding coach. Students: Ott Kiivikas.
