= Mireia Epelde =

Spanish cyclist

Personal information
- Born: 29 October 1985 (age 40)

Cycling career
- Sport: Cycling
- Role: Rider

Mireia Epelde (born 29 October 1985) is a Spanish racing cyclist. She competed in the 2013 UCI women's team time trial in Florence.
