= Roba Helane =

Syrian cyclist

Personal information
- Born: 13 January 1990 (age 36) Syria

Cycling career
- Sport: Cycling
- Discipline: Road
- Role: Rider

Major wins
- One day races & Classics National Road Race Championships (2014, 2015) National Time Trial Championships (2015)

Roba Helane (born 13 January 1990) is a Syrian road cyclist, who represented her nation at the 2011 UCI Road World Championships.

== Major results ==
2011
6th Golan I
7th Golan II
2014
1st Road race, National Road Championships
2015
National Road Championships

1st Road race
1st Time trial
