= Giusfredi–Bianchi =

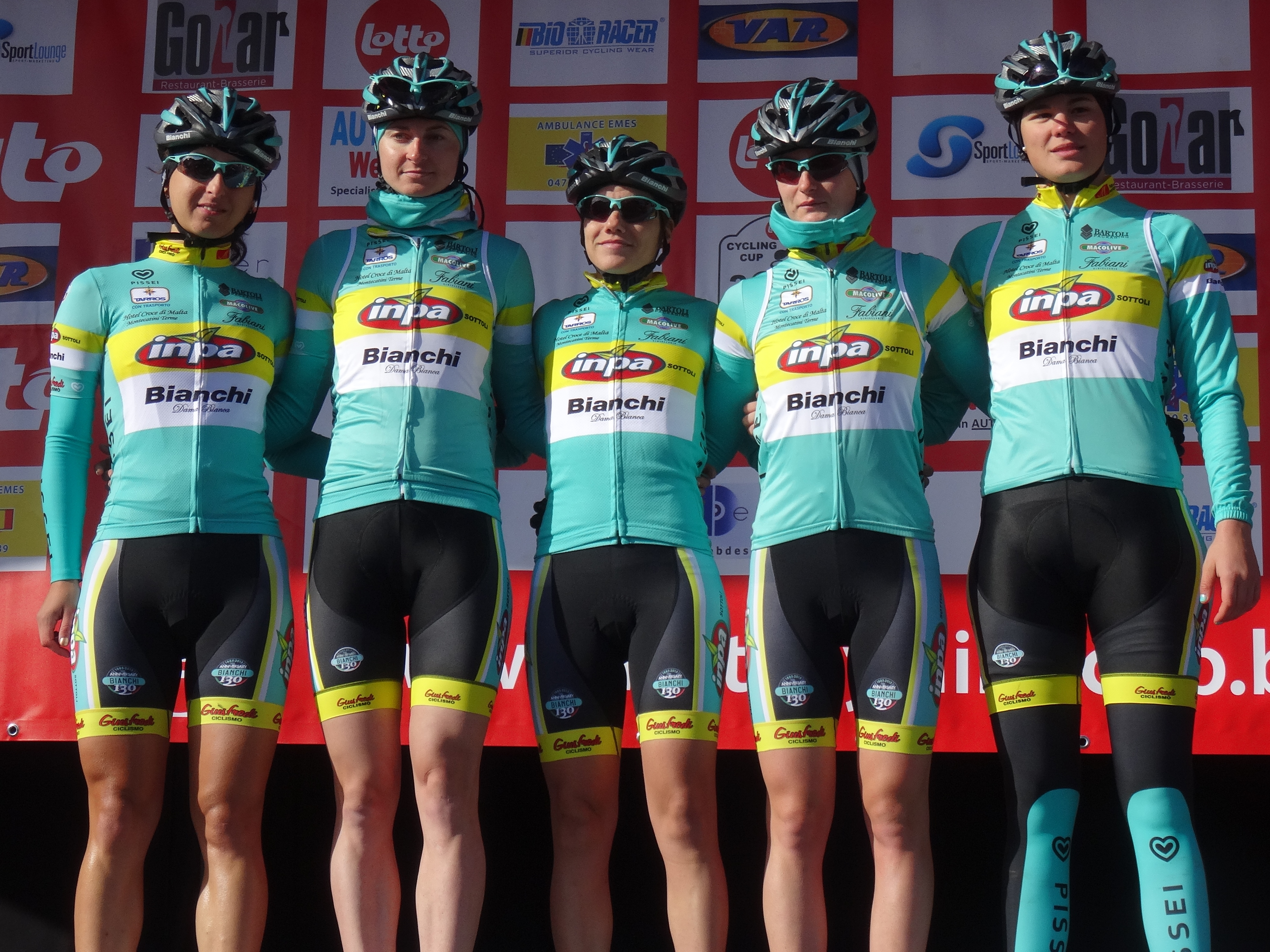
- The squad during the 2015 Le Samyn des Dames

Team information
- UCI code: GSB
- Registered: Italy
- Founded: 2015
- Disbanded: 2017
- Discipline: Road
- Status: UCI Women's Team
- Bicycles: Bianchi

Team name history
- 2015 2015 2016 2017: Team Inpa Bianchi Giusfredi; Team Inpa Sottoli Bianchi Giusfredi; Inpa–Bianchi; Team Giusfredi–Bianchi

Giusfredi–Bianchi (UCI code GSB) was a professional women's cycling team based in Italy.

== Team history ==
=== 2014 ===
==== Riders in ====
On October 17, Alica Maria Arzuffi, Valentina Bastianelli, Claudia Cretti, Angela Maffeis, Rossella Ratto, Tetyana Ryabchenko, Liisi Rist, Ane Santesteban, Anna Stricker, Anna Trevisi and Daiva Tušlaitė joined the team.

== Team roster ==
Rider	Date of birth
Michela Balducci (ITA)	30 March 1995 (age 31)
Simona Bortolotti (ITA)	6 December 1994 (age 31)
Vania Canvelli (ITA)	21 October 1997 (age 28)
Daniela Dumitru (ROU)	25 July 1987 (age 39)
Giorgia Fraiegari (ITA)	18 July 1995 (age 31)

Rider	Date of birth
Chiara Perini (ITA)	9 December 1997 (age 28)
Elena Pippi (ITA)	26 August 1999 (age 27)
Omer Shapira (ISR)	9 September 1994 (age 31)
Victoria Zavalloni (ITA)	17 September 1998 (age 27)

== Major wins ==
2015
Gran Premio Mamma E Papa Guerciotti AM, Alice Maria Arzuffi
2016
Horizon Park Women Challenge, Tetyana Ryabchenko
Prologue Tour de Bretagne Feminin, Lara Vieceli
Stage 1 Giro della Toscana Int. Femminile – Memorial Michela Fanini, Anna Stricker

== National champions ==
2015
Estonia Time Trial, Liisi Rist
Lithuania Road Race, Daiva Tušlaitė
Ukraine Road Race, Tetyana Ryabchenko
2016
Lithuania Road Race, Daiva Tušlaitė
Romania Road Race, Ana Covrig
Romania Time Trial, Ana Covrig
2017
Israel Road Race, Omer Shapira
