= Jérémy Bescond =

French cyclist

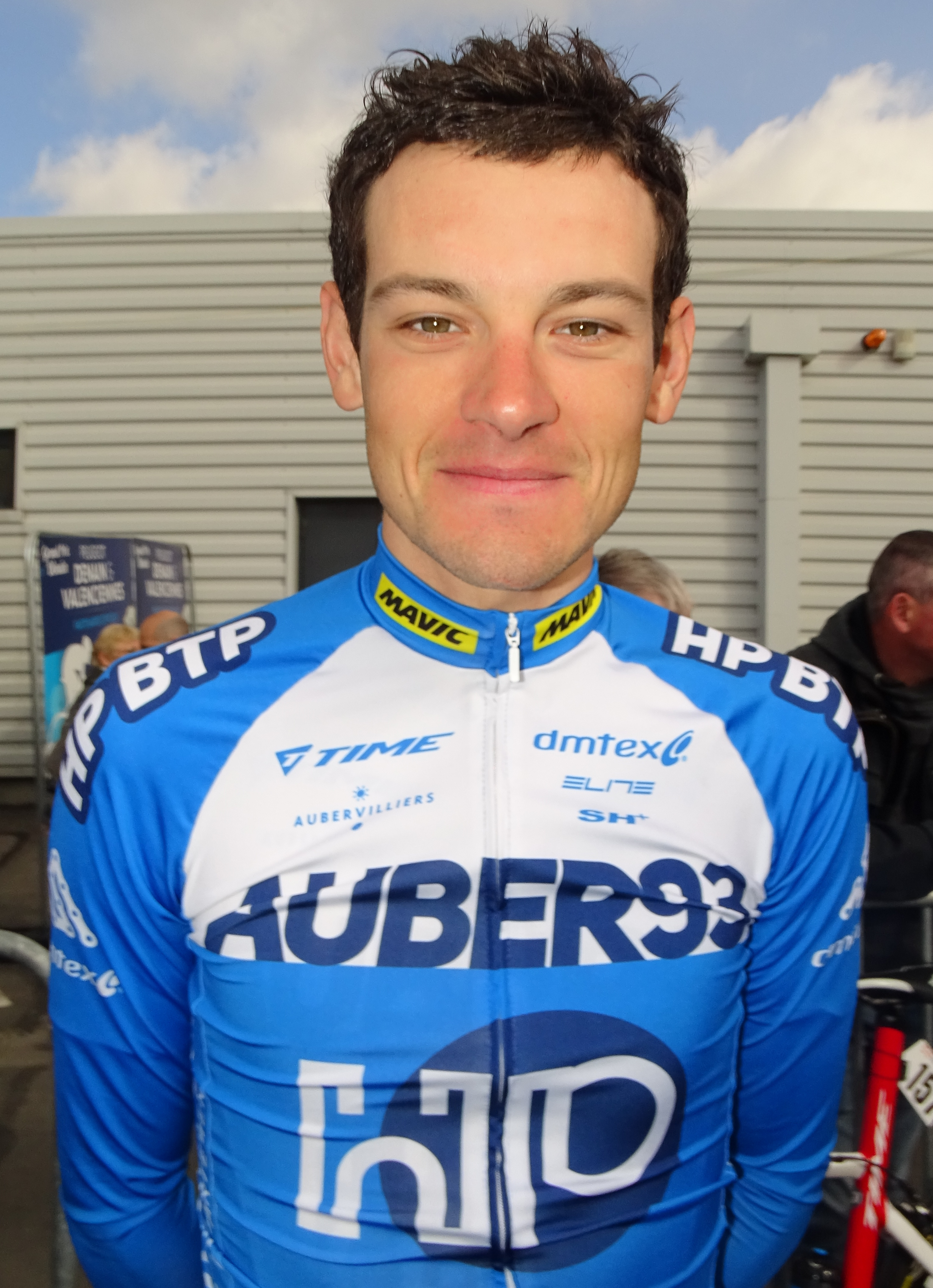

Personal information
- Born: 27 February 1991 (age 35) Douarnenez, France

Cycling career
- Sport: Cycling
- Current team: VC Vaulx-en-Velin
- Discipline: Road
- Role: Rider

Amateur teams
- 2009: Seyssinet-Seyssins
- 2010–2012: Vulco-VC Vaulx-en-Velin
- 2015: Charvieu-Chavagneux
- 2016: Cotes d'Armor-Marie Morin
- 2018: Cotes d'Armor-Marie Morin
- 2019: Hennebont cyclisme
- 2023–: VC Vaulx-en-Velin

Professional teams
- 2012: Cofidis (stagiaire)
- 2013–2014: Cofidis
- 2017: HP BTP–Auber93

Jérémy Bescond (born 27 February 1991 in Douarnenez) is a French cyclist, who currently rides for French amateur team VC Vaulx-en-Velin.

== Major results ==
2010
1st Prologue Tour du Gévaudan Languedoc-Roussillon (TTT)
2012
5th Overall Rhône-Alpes Isère Tour
2015
10th Overall Tour of Rwanda
2016
3rd Overall Kreiz Breizh Elites
2018
8th Overall Tour de Bretagne
