= Gert Jõeäär =

Estonian cyclist (born 1987)

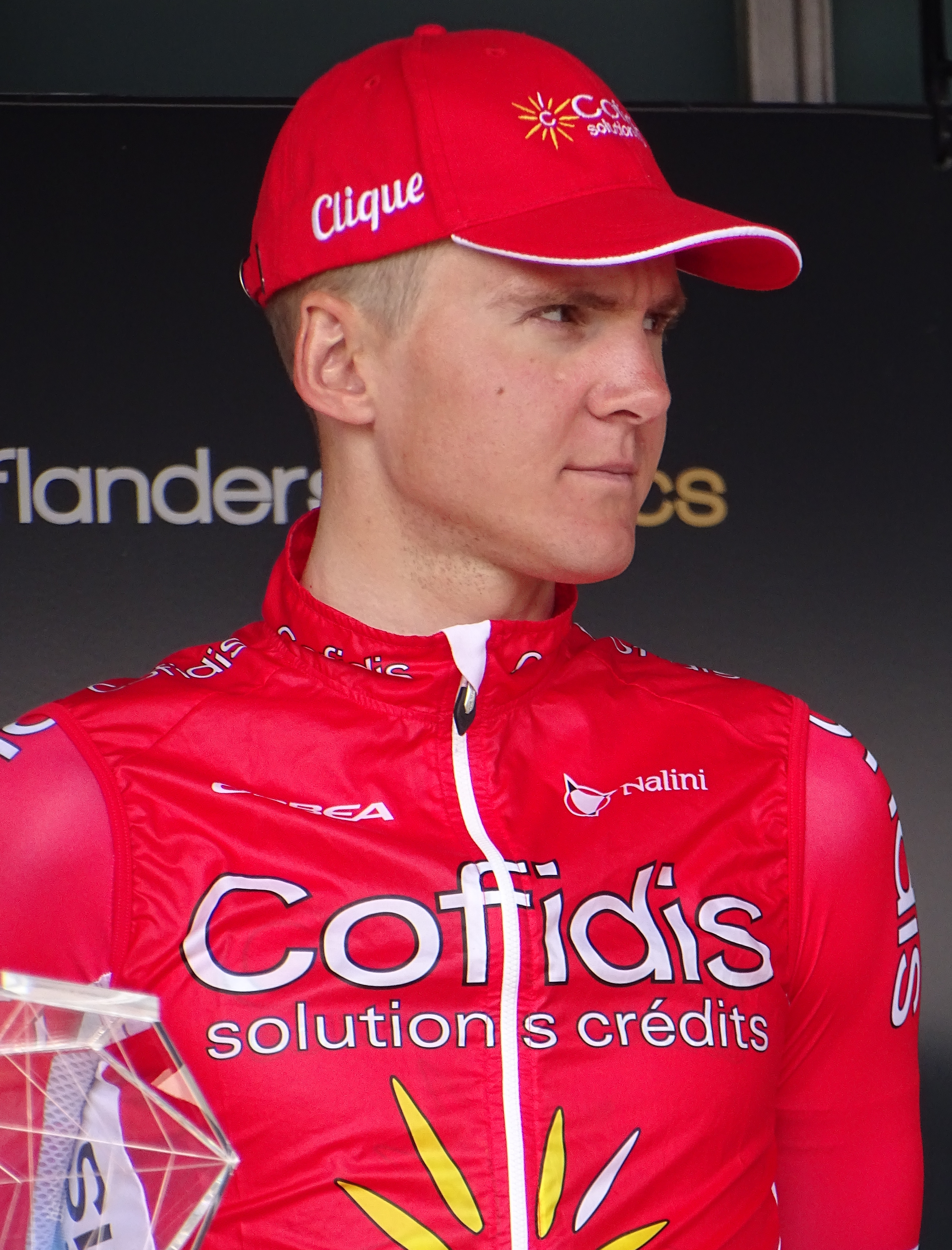
- Jõeäär at the 2015 Scheldeprijs

Personal information
- Full name: Gert Jõeäär
- Born: July 9, 1987 (age 39) Tallinn, then part of Estonian SSR, Soviet Union
- Height: 1.91 m (6 ft 3 in)
- Weight: 84 kg (185 lb)

Cycling career
- Sport: Cycling
- Current team: CFC Spordiklubi
- Discipline: Road
- Role: Rider
- Rider type: Rouleur

Amateur teams
- 2006: UC Artisienne
- 2007–2008: Vendée U
- 2010–2012: CC Villeneuve–Saint Germain
- 2017–: CFC Spordiklubi

Professional teams
- 2009: Meridiana–Kalev Chocolate
- 2013–2016: Cofidis

Major wins
- Single-day races and Classics National Time Trial Championships (2014–2016) National Road Race Championships (2015, 2017)

Gert Jõeäär (born July 9, 1987) is an Estonian road bicycle racer, who rides for Estonian amateur team CFC Spordiklubi. From 2013 to 2016, Jõeäär competed with UCI Professional Continental cycling team Cofidis.

== Major results ==
2005
5th Road race, UEC European Junior Road Championships
2006
3rd Time trial, National Under-23 Road Championships
2008
1st Time trial, National Under-23 Road Championships
8th Time trial, UEC European Under-23 Road Championships
2009
National Road Championships

3rd Time trial
4th Road race

3rd Tallinn–Tartu GP
2010
3rd Time trial, National Road Championships
2011
1st Stage 4 Ronde de l'Oise
National Road Championships

2nd Time trial
5th Road race

9th Grand Prix de la ville de Nogent-sur-Oise
9th Tallinn–Tartu GP
9th Tartu GP
2012
National Road Championships

2nd Road race
4th Time trial

8th Overall Ronde de l'Oise

1st Stage 2

2013
1st Overall Tour of Estonia

1st Stage 1b (ITT)

3rd Time trial, National Road Championships
4th Tro-Bro Léon
2014
National Road Championships

1st Time trial
2nd Road race

1st Overall Driedaagse van West–Vlaanderen

1st Prologue

6th Overall Tour of Estonia
2015
National Road Championships

1st Time trial
1st Road race

2016
1st Time trial, National Road Championships
6th Overall Boucles de la Mayenne
2017
National Road Championships

1st Road race
2nd Time trial

8th Overall Tour of Estonia

1st Stage 2

2018
National Road Championships

2nd Road race
5th Time trial

3rd Overall Baltic Chain Tour

1st Prologue

9th Overall Tour of Estonia
2019
3rd Road race, National Road Championships
2020
1st Overall Baltic Chain Tour

1st Points classification
1st Stage 3

2022
3rd Road race, National Road Championships
