= Andrus Aug =

Estonian cyclist

Personal information
- Full name: Andrus Aug
- Born: 22 May 1972 (age 54) Jõgeva, then part of Estonian SSR, Soviet Union
- Height: 1.90 m (6 ft 3 in)
- Weight: 83 kg (183 lb)

Cycling career
- Sport: Cycling
- Current team: Retired
- Discipline: Road
- Role: Rider
- Rider type: Sprinter

Professional teams
- 2001: Amore & Vita–Beretta
- 2002–2003: De Nardi–Pasta Montegrappa
- 2004: Domina Vacanze
- 2005: Fassa Bortolo
- 2006: Acqua & Sapone
- 2007: Ceramica Flaminia–Bossini Docce

Andrus Aug (born 22 May 1972) is an Estonian retired professional road bicycle racer. He last rode for UCI Professional Continental team Ceramica Flaminia.

== Major results ==
1995
2nd Road race, National Road Championships
1996
1st Road race, National Road Championships
1st Stage 7 Rapport Toer
1997
3rd Road race, National Road Championships
1999
2nd Road race, National Road Championships
2001
1st Trophy Riviera 3
1st GP Città di Rio Saliceto e Correggio
1st Stages 1 & 5 Course de la Solidarité Olympique
1st Stages 1, 7, 8, 9 & 13 Tour of Maroc
1st Stage 5 Tour of Bulgaria
3rd Road race, National Road Championships
2002
1st Gran Premio Nobili Rubinetterie
1st Poreč Trophy 4
1st Trofeo Città di Borgomanero
1st Stage 2 Tour of Poland
1st Stage 9 Peace Race
1st Stage 1 Course de la Solidarité Olympique
1st Stage 4 Tour of Slovakia
1st Stage 3 Jadranska Magistrala
2nd E.O.S. Tallinn GP
5th Giro del Lago Maggiore
2004
1st GP de la Ville de Rennes
2nd GP Costa degli Etruschi
2005
1st Stage 4 Giro del Trentino
1st Stage 4 Saaremaa Velotuur
2nd Tartu GP
2006
1st Overall Saaremaa Velotuur

1st Stages 2, 5 & 6

4th GP Costa degli Etruschi
2007
1st Stage 4 Saaremaa Velotuur
7th Riga GP
2008
5th Riga GP
