= Alo Jakin =

Estonian cyclist (born 1986)

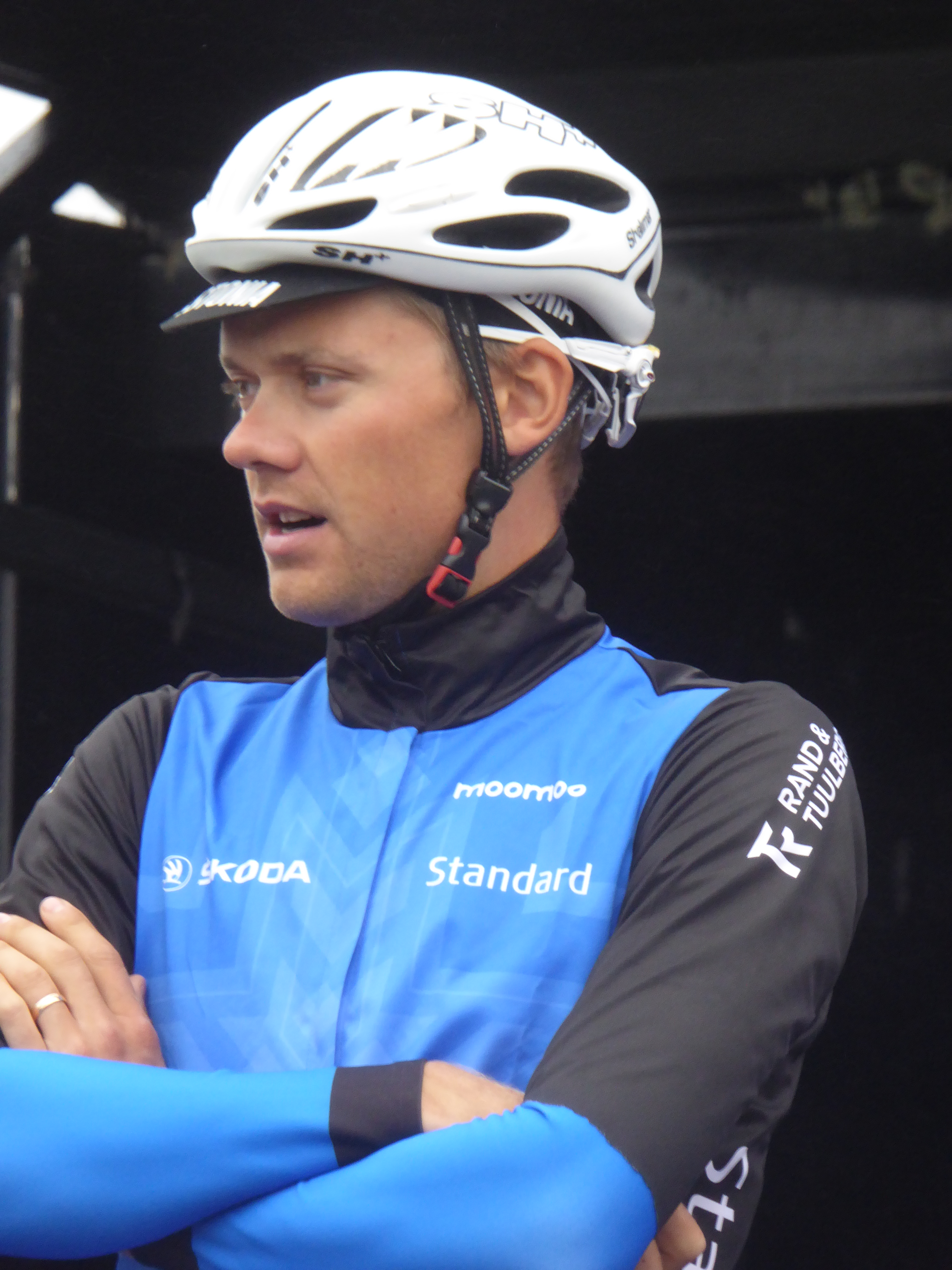
- Jakin at the 2018 European Road Cycling Championships

Personal information
- Full name: Alo Jakin
- Born: 14 November 1986 (age 39) Tartu, then part of Estonian SSR, Soviet Union
- Height: 186 cm (6 ft 1 in)
- Weight: 71 kg (157 lb)

Cycling career
- Sport: Cycling
- Discipline: Road
- Role: Rider; Coach
- Rider type: All-rounder

Amateur teams
- 2002–2003: PRT
- 2004–2006: JK Tamme
- 2008–2009: Charvieu–Chavagneux
- 2010–2011: CC Villeneuve–Saint Germain
- 2012–2013: VC Rouen 76
- 2020–2024: Peloton

Professional teams
- 2006–2007: Kalev Chocolate Team
- 2014–2019: BigMat–Auber 93

Major wins
- Single-day races and Classics National Road Race Championships (2014, 2019)
Medal record
Men's road bicycle racing
Representing Estonia
European Games
Silver medal – second place	2019 Minsk	Road race

Alo Jakin (born 14 November 1986) is an Estonian cyclist and coach, who most recently rode for Estonian amateur team Peloton. Jakin rode professionally between 2006 and 2007 and from 2014 to 2019; in his final professional season, Jakin won his second Estonian National Road Race Championships title and also won a silver medal in the road race at the European Games.

== Major results ==
2010
9th Tallinn–Tartu GP
2011
5th Tallinn–Tartu GP
6th Grand Prix de la ville de Nogent-sur-Oise
8th La Roue Tourangelle
10th Grand Prix des Marbriers
2013
1st Stage 3 Ronde de l'Oise
9th Overall Tour of Estonia
2014
National Road Championships

1st Road race
2nd Time trial

2015
1st Boucles de l'Aulne
3rd Overall Four Days of Dunkirk
3rd Grand Prix de la Somme
9th Grand Prix de la ville de Pérenchies
2016
1st Stage 4 Circuit des Ardennes
3rd Road race, National Road Championships
2017
2nd Road race, National Road Championships
5th Route Adélie de Vitré
10th La Drôme Classic
2018
2nd Time trial, National Road Championships
7th Overall Tour of Estonia
8th Overall Boucles de la Mayenne
2019
1st Road race, National Road Championships
2nd Road race, European Games
2020
2nd Overall Baltic Chain Tour

1st Stage 1

2021
3rd Road race, National Road Championships
