= Lauri Aus =

Estonian cyclist (1970–2003)

Personal information
- Full name: Lauri Aus
- Born: 4 November 1970 Tartu, then part of Estonian SSR, Soviet Union
- Died: 20 July 2003 (aged 32) Matjama, Tartu County, Estonia
- Height: 1.79 m (5 ft 10 in)
- Weight: 75 kg (165 lb)

Cycling career
- Sport: Cycling
- Discipline: Road
- Role: Rider

Amateur teams
- 1992–1993: AC Boulogne-Billancourt
- 1994: US Créteil

Professional teams
- 1995–1996: Mutuelle de Seine-et-Marne
- 1997–2003: Casino

Major wins
- Single-day races and Classics National Road Race Championships (1992, 2000) National Time Trial Championships (1993, 1994, 1996, 2000)

Lauri Aus (4 November 1970 – 20 July 2003) was an Estonian professional cyclist who represented his native country at three consecutive Summer Olympics, starting in 1992.

== Early life and career ==
Aus was born in Tartu and grew up in the village of Luua in Jõgeva County. His professional cycling career began in 1995 with the French cycling team Mutuelle de Seine-et-Marne. After four wins in 1996, he was signed to Casino the following year alongside countryman Jaan Kirsipuu. He remained with this team until his death, which was renamed the AG2R Citroën Team in 2000. Aus won a Tour du Limousin (1997), a Tour Poitou-Charentes en Nouvelle-Aquitaine (1998), a Classic Haribo (1998) and a Grand Prix d'Isbergues (1999). In 1999, he was fifth at Milan–San Remo. In 2000, he became the Estonian road champion.

In 1992, 1996 and 2000, Aus represented his home country at the Summer Olympic Games. At the 1992 Summer Olympic Games in Barcelona, he finished fifth in the road race.

== Death and legacy ==
On 20 July 2003, while cycling on the Aovere-Kallaste-Omedu road in Tartu County in preparation for a later race in Karksi-Nuia, he was struck from behind by an Opel Ascona. He died of his injuries en route to a hospital, aged thirty-two. He was buried at Raadi cemetery in Tartu. The driver of the vehicle was determined to have been drunk and later sentenced to three and a half years' imprisonment and a fine.

Since 2004, the Lauri Aus GP memorial cycling race is held annually at the Pirita-Kloostrimetsa race circuit, next to the Pirita Velodrome, in Tallinn in honour of Aus.

In July 2019, a memorial bench commemorating Aus was opened to the public in Aus' hometown of Luua, by Aus' parents, children, widow, first coach Kalev Raudsepp, and politician Aivar Kokk.

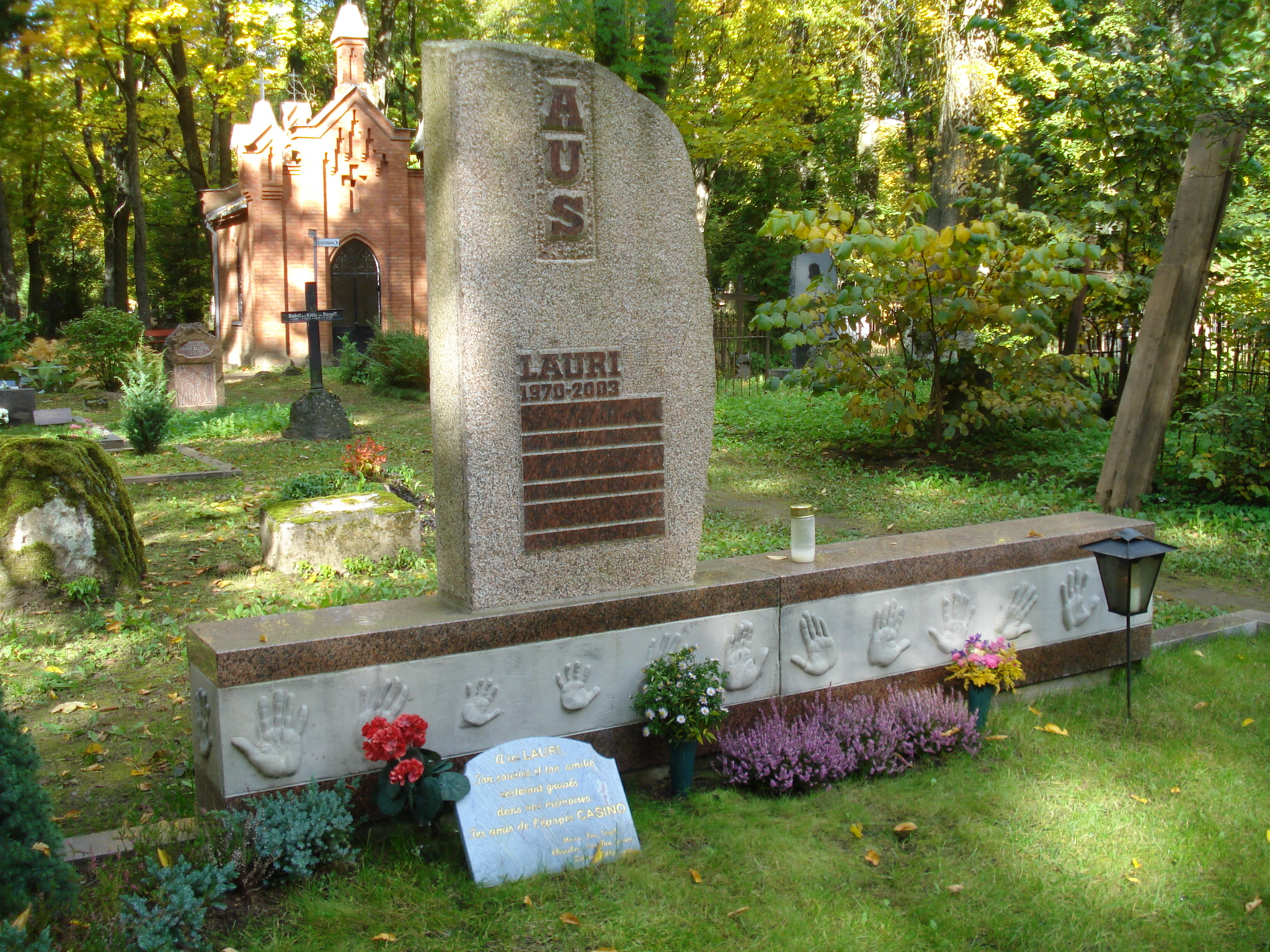
Aus' gravestone at Raadi cemetery in Tartu

== Major results ==
1989
3rd Road race, National Road Championships
1990
3rd Road race, National Road Championships
1992
1st Road race, National Road Championships
5th Road Race, Summer Olympics
8th Overall Tour of Sweden
1993
1st Time trial, National Road Championships
1994
1st Time trial, National Road Championships
1995
9th Grand Prix de Denain
1996
1st Time trial, National Road Championships
1st Stages 3 & 6 Ruban Granitier Breton
1st Stages 2 & 6 Tour du Poitou-Charentes
1997
1st Overall Tour de Limousin

1st Stage 3

1st Stage 1 Tour de Pologne
2nd Cholet-Pays de Loire
3rd Grand Prix d'Isbergues
7th Road race, UCI Road World Championships
8th Overall Tour de Luxembourg
1998
1st Overall Tour du Poitou-Charentes

1st Stage 1

1st Classic Haribo
National Road Championships

2nd Time trial
3rd Road race

2nd Overall Tour de l'Oise

1st Stage 1

3rd Boucles de Seine Saint-Denis
8th Brabantse Pijl
1999
1st Grand Prix d'Isbergues
3rd Overall Tour du Poitou-Charentes

1st Points classification

3rd Overall Tour de Limousin
5th Milan–San Remo
7th Overall Tour de Wallonie
2000
National Road Championships
1st Road race

1st Time trial

2nd Grand Prix d'Ouverture La Marseillaise
2001
3rd Overall Tour du Poitou-Charentes

1st Stage 4

8th Overall Paris–Corrèze
2003
National Road Championships

2nd Road race
2nd Time trial

3rd Overall Driedaagse van West-Vlaanderen
3rd E.O.S. Tallinn GP

== See also ==
- List of racing cyclists and pacemakers with a cycling-related death
