= Allan Oras =

Estonian cyclist

Personal information
- Born: 20 December 1975 (age 50) Tartu, then part of Estonian SSR, Soviet Union

Cycling career
- Sport: Cycling
- Current team: Retired
- Disciplines: Road; Mountain biking
- Role: Rider

Amateur team
- 2005–2006: Charvieu-Chavagneux Isére Cyclisme

Professional team
- 2012: Rietumu–Delfin

Allan Oras (born 20 December 1975) is an Estonian cyclist.

He was born in Tartu. In 1994 he graduated from Tartu School of Construction and Light Industry (Estonian: Tartu Ehitus- ja Kergetööstuskool).

He began his cycling career in 1988, coached by Harald Osjamets. From 1991 to 2001 his coach was Rein Pruuli. In 2009 he won the gold medal at the European Mountain Bike Championships in the cross-country marathon. He is multiple-times Estonian champion in different cycling disciplines. From 1995 to 2011 he was a member of Estonian national cycling team.

== Major results ==
=== Road ===
1997
2nd Road race, National Road Championships
1999
National Road Championships

2nd Time trial
3rd Road race

2000
3rd Time trial, National Road Championships
2004
5th Tartu GP
2005
1st Tour de Corrèze
2006
2nd Road race, National Road Championships
2nd Tartu GP
2007
3rd Road race, National Road Championships
2008
2nd Time trial, National Road Championships
2009
6th Tartu GP
10th Scandinavian Open Road Race
2010
6th Tartu GP

=== MTB ===
2009
1st European XCM Championships
