= 2025 EF Education–EasyPost season =

EF Education–EasyPost
- 2025 season
- UCI code: EFE
- Status: UCI WorldTeam
- Manager: Jonathan Vaughters (USA)
- Main sponsor(s): EF Education First
- Based: United States
- Bicycles: Cannondale
- Groupset: Shimano

Season victories
- One-day races: 3
- Stage race stages: 6
- National Championships: 1
- Most wins: (Republic of Ireland) Ben Healy (United States) Neilson Powless (Netherlands) Marijn van den Berg (2 wins each)

The 2025 season for the EF Education–EasyPost team is the team's 22nd season in existence and the 17th consecutive season as a UCI WorldTeam.

== Team roster ==
As of January 7, 2025.

Rider	Date of birth
Vincenzo Albanese (ITA)	November 12, 1996 (age 28)
Kasper Asgreen (DEN)	February 8, 1995 (age 30)
Samuele Battistella (ITA)	November 14, 1998 (age 26)
Alex Baudin (FRA)	May 25, 2001 (age 24)
Markel Beloki (ESP)	July 27, 2005 (age 19)
Richard Carapaz (ECU)	May 29, 1993 (age 32)
Hugh Carthy (GBR)	July 9, 1994 (age 31)
Jefferson Alexander Cepeda (ECU)	June 16, 1998 (age 27)
Esteban Chaves (COL)	January 17, 1990 (age 35)
Rui Costa (POR)	October 5, 1986 (age 38)
Owain Doull (GBR)	May 2, 1993 (age 32)
Ben Healy (IRL)	September 11, 2000 (age 24)
Mikkel Frølich Honoré (DEN)	January 29, 1997 (age 28)
Alastair Mackellar (AUS)	January 20, 2002 (age 23)
Madis Mihkels (EST)	May 21, 2003 (age 22)

Rider	Date of birth
Lachlan Morton (AUS)	January 2, 1992 (age 33)
Lukas Nerurkar (GBR)	November 14, 2003 (age 21)
Neilson Powless (USA)	September 3, 1996 (age 28)
Sean Quinn (USA)	May 10, 2000 (age 25)
Darren Rafferty (IRL)	July 1, 2003 (age 22)
Jack Rootkin-Gray (GBR)	November 5, 2002 (age 22)
Archie Ryan (IRL)	November 16, 2001 (age 23)
James Shaw (GBR)	June 13, 1996 (age 29)
Georg Steinhauser (GER)	October 21, 2001 (age 23)
Harry Sweeny (AUS)	July 9, 1998 (age 27)
Yuhi Todome (JPN)	June 18, 2002 (age 23)
Michael Valgren (DEN)	February 7, 1992 (age 33)
Marijn van den Berg (NED)	July 19, 1999 (age 25)
Jardi van der Lee (NED)	August 6, 2001 (age 23)
Max Walker (GBR)	July 14, 2001 (age 24)

== Season victories ==
Date	Race	Competition	Rider	Country	Location	Ref.
30 January	Trofeo Ses Salines	UCI Europe Tour	Marijn van den Berg (NED)	Spain	Colònia de Sant Jordi	
2 April	Dwars door Vlaanderen	UCI World Tour	Neilson Powless (USA)	Belgium	Waregem	
11 April	Tour of the Basque Country, stage 5	UCI World Tour	Ben Healy (IRL)	Spain	Gernika-Lumo	
21 May	Giro d'Italia, stage 11	UCI World Tour	Richard Carapaz (ECU)	Italy	Castelnovo ne' Monti	
24 May	Giro d'Italia, stage 14	UCI World Tour	Kasper Asgreen (DEN)	Slovenia	Nova Gorica	
13 June	GP Gippingen	UCI Europe Tour	Neilson Powless (USA)	Switzerland	Leuggern	
16 June	Tour de Suisse, stage 2	UCI World Tour	Vincenzo Albanese (ITA)	Switzerland	Schwarzsee	
19 June	Route d'Occitanie, stage 2	UCI Europe Tour	Marijn van den Berg (NED)	France	Carmaux Ségala	
10 July	Tour de France, stage 6	UCI World Tour	Ben Healy (IRL)	France	Vire Normandie	

== National, Continental, and World Champions ==
Date	Discipline	Jersey	Rider	Country	Location	Ref.
29 June	Estonian National Road Race Championships		Madis Mihkels (EST)	Latvia (Note: The Latvian, Lithuanian and Estonian road championships were jointly held in Cēsis, Latvia as the 2025 Baltic Road Championships.)	Cēsis	
