= Mart Ojavee =

Estonian cyclist

Personal information
- Born: 9 November 1981 (age 44) Tallinn, then part of Estonian SSR, Soviet Union

Cycling career
- Sport: Cycling
- Current team: Retired
- Discipline: Road
- Role: Rider

Professional teams
- 2004–2007: Kalev Chocolate Team
- 2008: Rietumu Banka–Riga
- 2009: Cycling Club Bourgas
- 2010–2013: CKT TMIT–Champion System

Mart Ojavee (born 9 November 1981 in Tallinn) is an Estonian cyclist.

== Major results ==
2007
1st Stages 1 & 4 An Post Rás
1st Stage 7 Tour of Bulgaria
3rd Scandinavian Open Road Race
2008
1st Stage 1 Five Rings of Moscow
1st Tallinn–Tartu GP
1st Stage 4 Way to Pekin
3rd Memoriał Henryka Łasaka
7th SEB Tartu Grand Prix
2009
1st Grand Prix of Donetsk
5th National Road Race Championships
2010
4th National Road Race Championships
2011
1st National Road Race Championships
1st Overall Saaremaa Velotuur

1st Stage 1 (TTT)

3rd National Time Trial Championships
2012
1st Overall Saaremaa Velotuur

1st Stage 1 (TTT)

4th National Road Race Championships
2013
4th National Time Trial Championships
