= Estonian National Road Race Championships =

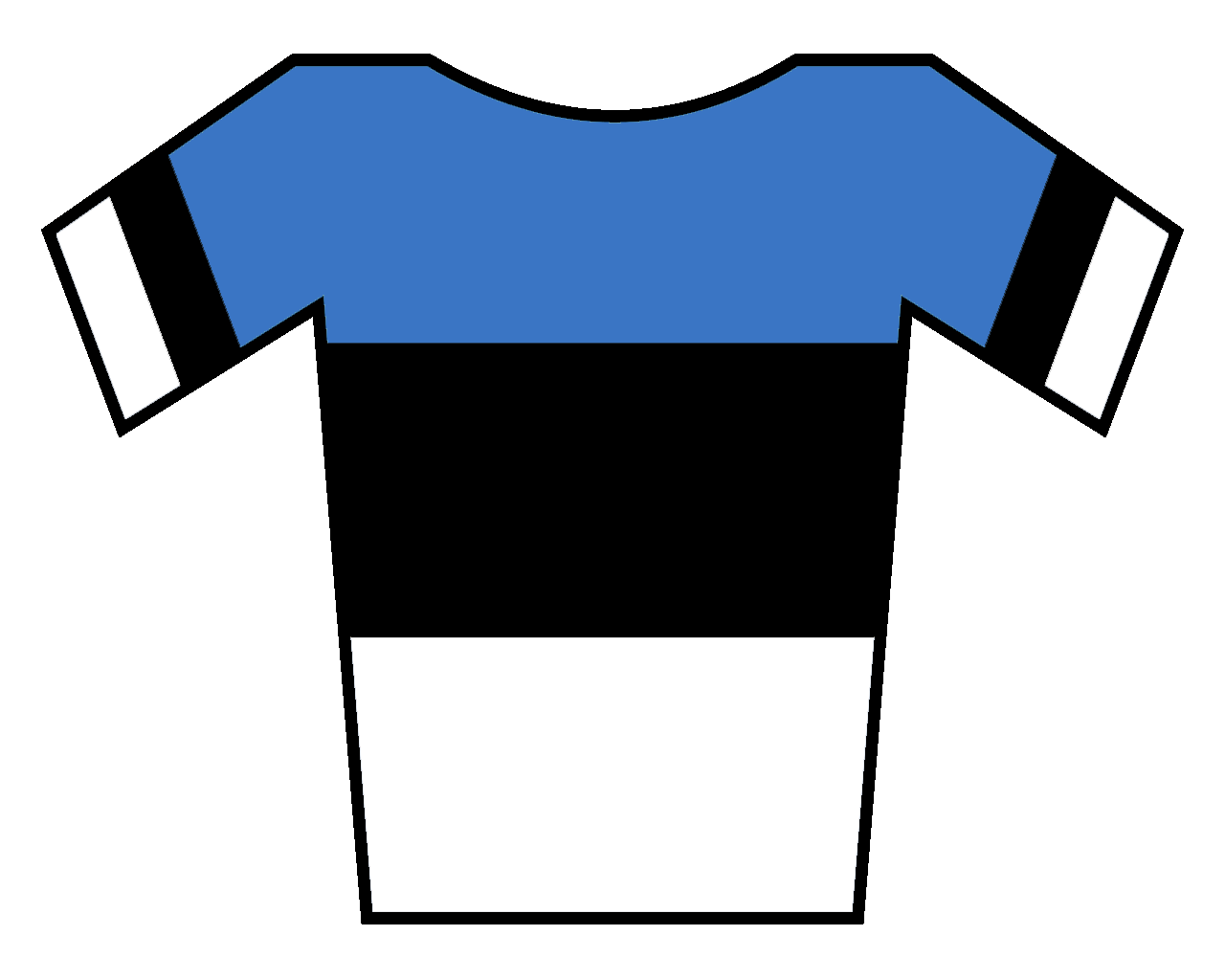
The champion's jersey

The Estonian National Road Race Championship is a road bicycle race that takes place inside the Estonian National Cycling Championship, and decides the best cyclist in this type of race. The first edition took place in 1994, and was won by Andres Lauk. Jaan Kirsipuu holds the record for the most wins in the men's championship with 5, while Grete Treier holds the record for most wins in the women's championship with 5 wins. The current champions are Madis Mihkels and Elisabeth Ebras.

== Multiple winners ==
Men

Wins	Name	Years
5	Jaan Kirsipuu	1998, 1999, 2002, 2005, 2008
4	Mihkel Räim	2016, 2018, 2021, 2022
3	Erki Pütsep	2004, 2006, 2007
2	Janek Tombak	2001, 2003
2	Rein Taaramäe	2009, 2013
2	Gert Jõeäär	2015, 2017
2	Alo Jakin	2014, 2019
2	Norman Vahtra	2020, 2024

Women

Wins	Name	Years
5	Grete Treier	2007, 2008, 2010, 2011, 2012
4	Liisa Ehrberg	2009, 2015, 2018, 2019
3	Aidi Gerde Tuisk	2020, 2021, 2022
2	Liisi Rist	2013, 2014
2	Kelly Kalm	2016, 2017
2	Laura Lizette Sander	2023, 2024

== Men ==
=== Elite ===
Estonian National Road Race Championships – Men's elite race
Race details
- Region: Estonia
- Discipline: Road bicycle racing
- Type: One-day

History
- First edition: 1994
- First winner: Andres Lauk
- Most wins: Jaan Kirsipuu (5 wins)
- Most recent: Romet Pajur

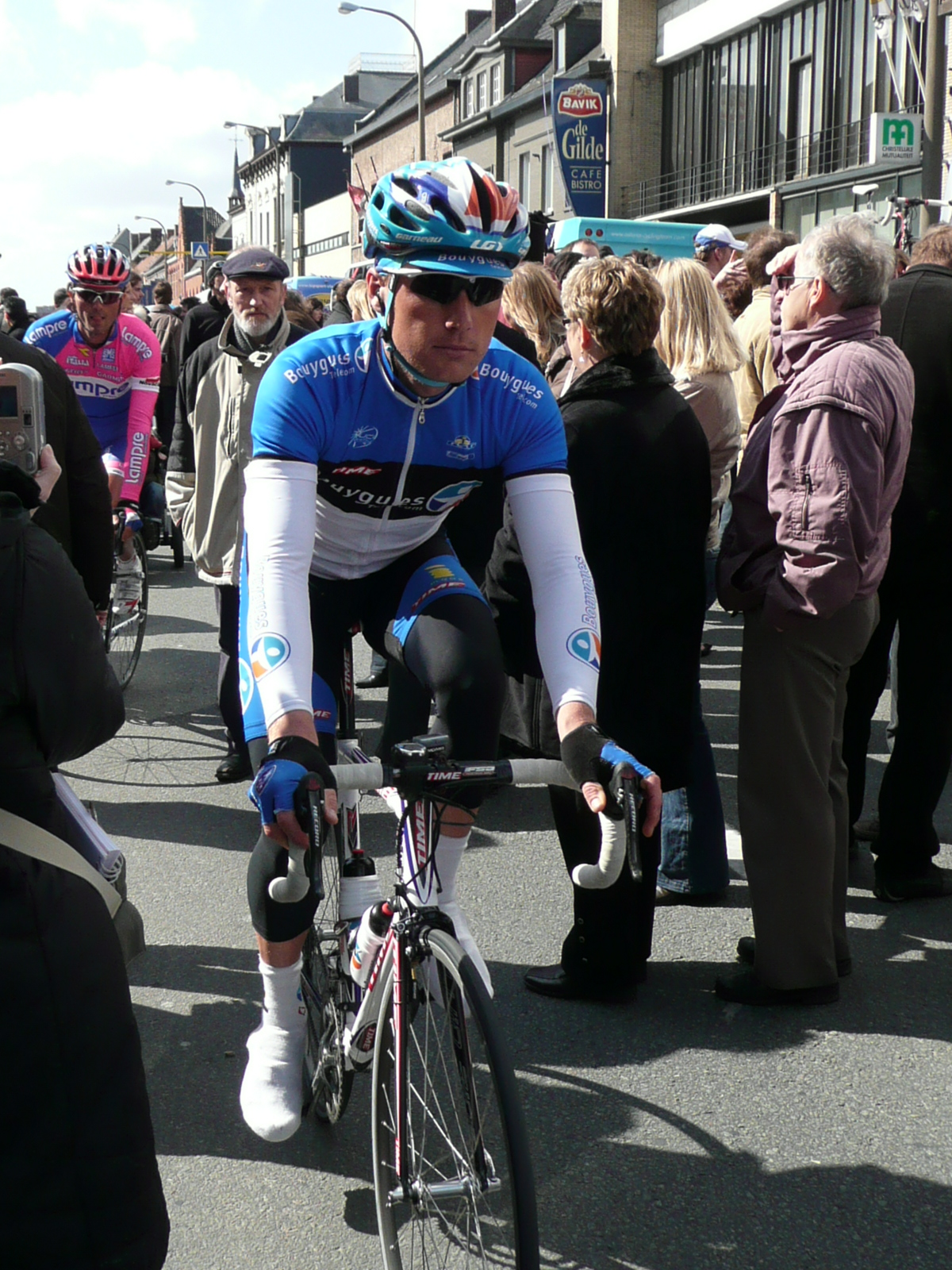
Erki Pütsep in the champions jersey.

Year	Gold	Silver	Bronze
1994	Andres Lauk	Martin Kukk	Alges Maasikmets
1995	Raido Kodanipork	Andrus Aug	Andres Lauk
1996	Andrus Aug	Janek Tombak	Janek Ermel
1997	Oskari Kargu	Allan Oras	Andrus Aug
1998	Jaan Kirsipuu	Janek Tombak	Lauri Aus
1999	Jaan Kirsipuu	Andrus Aug	Allan Oras
2000	Lauri Aus	Jaan Kirsipuu	Janek Tombak
2001	Janek Tombak	Jaan Kirsipuu	Andrus Aug
2002	Jaan Kirsipuu	Andri Lebedev	Janek Tombak
2003	Janek Tombak	Lauri Aus	Erki Pütsep
2004	Erki Pütsep	Janek Tombak	Oskari Kargu
2005	Jaan Kirsipuu	Erki Pütsep	Janek Tombak
2006	Erki Pütsep	Allan Oras	Andrei Mustonen
2007	Erki Pütsep	Jaan Kirsipuu	Allan Oras
2008	Jaan Kirsipuu	Kalle Kriit	Erki Pütsep
2009	Rein Taaramäe	Sander Maasing	Erki Pütsep
2010	Kalle Kriit	Tanel Kangert	Jaan Kirsipuu
2011	Mart Ojavee	Martin Puusepp	Tanel Kangert
2012	Tanel Kangert	Gert Jõeäär	Rein Taaramäe
2013	Rein Taaramäe	Silver Schultz	Ivo Suur
2014	Alo Jakin	Gert Jõeäär	Risto Raid
2015	Gert Jõeäär	Rein Taaramäe	Endrik Puntso
2016	Mihkel Räim	Silver Mäoma	Alo Jakin
2017	Gert Jõeäär	Alo Jakin	Rein Taaramäe
2018	Mihkel Räim	Gert Jõeäär	Karl Patrick Lauk
2019	Alo Jakin	Peeter Pruus	Gert Jõeäär
2020	Norman Vahtra	Karl Patrick Lauk	Gert Kivistik
2021	Mihkel Räim	Karl Patrick Lauk	Alo Jakin
2022	Mihkel Räim	Siim Kiskonen	Gert Jõeäär
2023	Karl Patrick Lauk	Lauri Tamm	Rein Taaramäe
2024	Norman Vahtra	Lauri Tamm	Markus Pajur
2025	Madis Mihkels	Markus Mäeuibo	Aaron Aus
2026	Romet Pajur	Oskar Küüt	Norman Vahtra

== Women ==
=== Elite ===
Estonian National Road Race Championships – Women's elite race
Race details
- Region: Estonia
- Discipline: Road bicycle racing
- Type: One-day

History
- First edition: 2007
- First winner: Grete Treier
- Most wins: Grete Treier (5 wins)
- Most recent: Elisabeth Ebras

Year	Gold	Silver	Bronze
2007	Grete Treier	Maaris Meier	Laura Lepasalu
2008	Grete Treier	Laura Lepasalu	Liisa Ehrberg
2009	Liisa Ehrberg	Maaris Meier	Laura Lepasalu
2010	Grete Treier	Liisa Ehrberg	Kristel Koort
2011	Grete Treier	Liisi Rist	Kristel Koort
2012	Grete Treier	Liisi Rist	Liisa Ehrberg
2013	Liisi Rist	Kristel Koort	Liisa Ehrberg
2014	Liisi Rist	Liisa Ehrberg	Kristel Koort
2015	Liisa Ehrberg	Liisi Rist	Kelly Kalm
2016	Kelly Kalm	Janelle Uibokand	Mae Lang
2017	Kelly Kalm	Mathilde Nigul	Merili Sirvel
2018	Liisa Ehrberg	Kelly Kalm	Mathilde Nigul
2019	Liisa Ehrberg	Mae Lang	Janelle Uibokand
2020	Aidi Gerde Tuisk	Kelly Kalm	Birgit Tito
2021	Aidi Gerde Tuisk	Mari-Liis Mõttus	Liisa Ehrberg
2022	Aidi Gerde Tuisk	Kristel Sandra Soonik	Elina Tasane
2023	Laura Lizette Sander	Elina Tasane	Elisabeth Ebras
2024	Laura Lizette Sander	Elisabeth Ebras	Kristel Sandra Soonik
2025	Elisabeth Ebras	Laura Lizette Sander	Merili Sirvel
