= Jonas Ljungblad =

Swedish cyclist

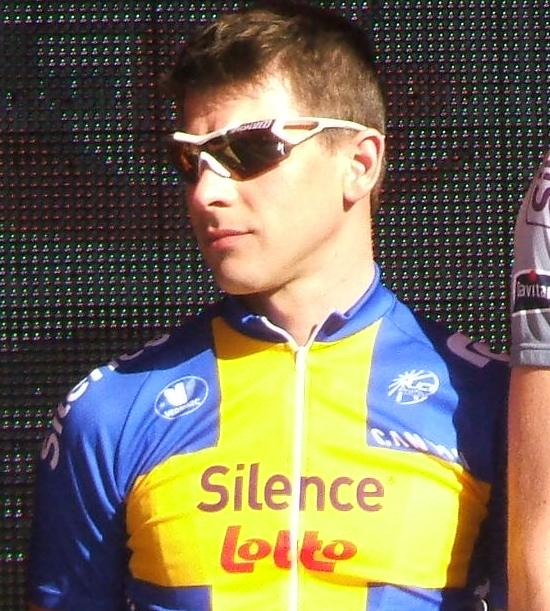

Personal information
- Full name: Jonas Ljungblad
- Born: January 15, 1979 (age 47) Gothenburg, Sweden
- Height: 1.77 m (5 ft 10 in)
- Weight: 70 kg (154 lb)

Cycling career
- Sport: Cycling
- Current team: Retired
- Discipline: Road
- Role: Rider

Amateur team
- 1999: Team Crescent Tranemo

Professional teams
- 2000–2001: Team Crescent
- 2002: Amore & Vita–Beretta
- 2003: Team Bianchi Scandinavia
- 2004–2005: Amore & Vita–Beretta
- 2006–2007: Unibet.com
- 2008: P3 Transfer–Batavus
- 2009–2010: Silence–Lotto
- 2011–2012: Differdange–Magic–SportFood.de

Jonas Ljungblad (born January 15, 1979, in Gothenburg) is a Swedish former road racing cyclist. He began his professional career with the Amore & Vita team in 2002 as a young helper, but after spending a season with Team Bianchi his career began to skyrocket with a very successful Australian excursion in 2004 winning the Tour of Queensland and the Herald Sun Tour.

In 2005 he acquired his biggest victory to date, winning the Swedish national championship. This, along with his win in the Route d'Vendée, attracted the attention of Unibet.com Cycling Team who hired him to be a helper to the likes of Baden Cooke and Frank Vandenbroucke.

== Major results ==
1996
1st Time trial, National Junior Road Championships
2000
5th Road race, National Road Championships
8th Overall Flèche du Sud
9th Overall International Tour of Rhodes
2001
1st Stage 4 Okolo Slovenska
3rd Scandinavian Open Road Race
5th Road race, UCI Under-23 Road World Championships
2002
3rd Overall Herald Sun Tour

1st Stage 3

5th Scandinavian Open Road Race
8th Paris–Camembert
2003
7th Overall Ringerike GP
8th Overall Herald Sun Tour
2004
1st Overall Herald Sun Tour

1st Stage 7

1st Overall Tour of Queensland

1st Stages 5 & 7

3rd Scandinavian Open Road Race
4th Boucles de l'Aulne
10th Overall Tour de Slovénie

1st Stage 4

2005
1st Road race, National Road Championships
1st Tour du Lac Léman
1st Tour de Vendée
1st Melbourne to Warrnambool Classic
3rd Scandinavian Open Road Race
3rd E.O.S. Tallinn GP
5th Giro del Lago Maggiore
7th Tartu GP
9th Trofeo Franco Balestra
2006
3rd Grand Prix de Villers-Cotterêts
4th Overall Tour de Luxembourg

1st Stage 3

5th Tour de Vendée
6th Boucles de l'Aulne
2007
9th Cholet-Pays de Loire
2008
1st Road race, National Road Championships
1st Stage 3 Vuelta Ciclista a León
1st Stage 2 Troféu Joaquim Agostinho
1st Stage 3 Circuit des Ardennes
10th Overall Volta da Ascension

1st Points classification
1st Stage 1

2011
3rd Tartu GP
5th Ronde van Noord-Holland
9th Paris–Camembert
