= Janek Tombak =

Estonian cyclist

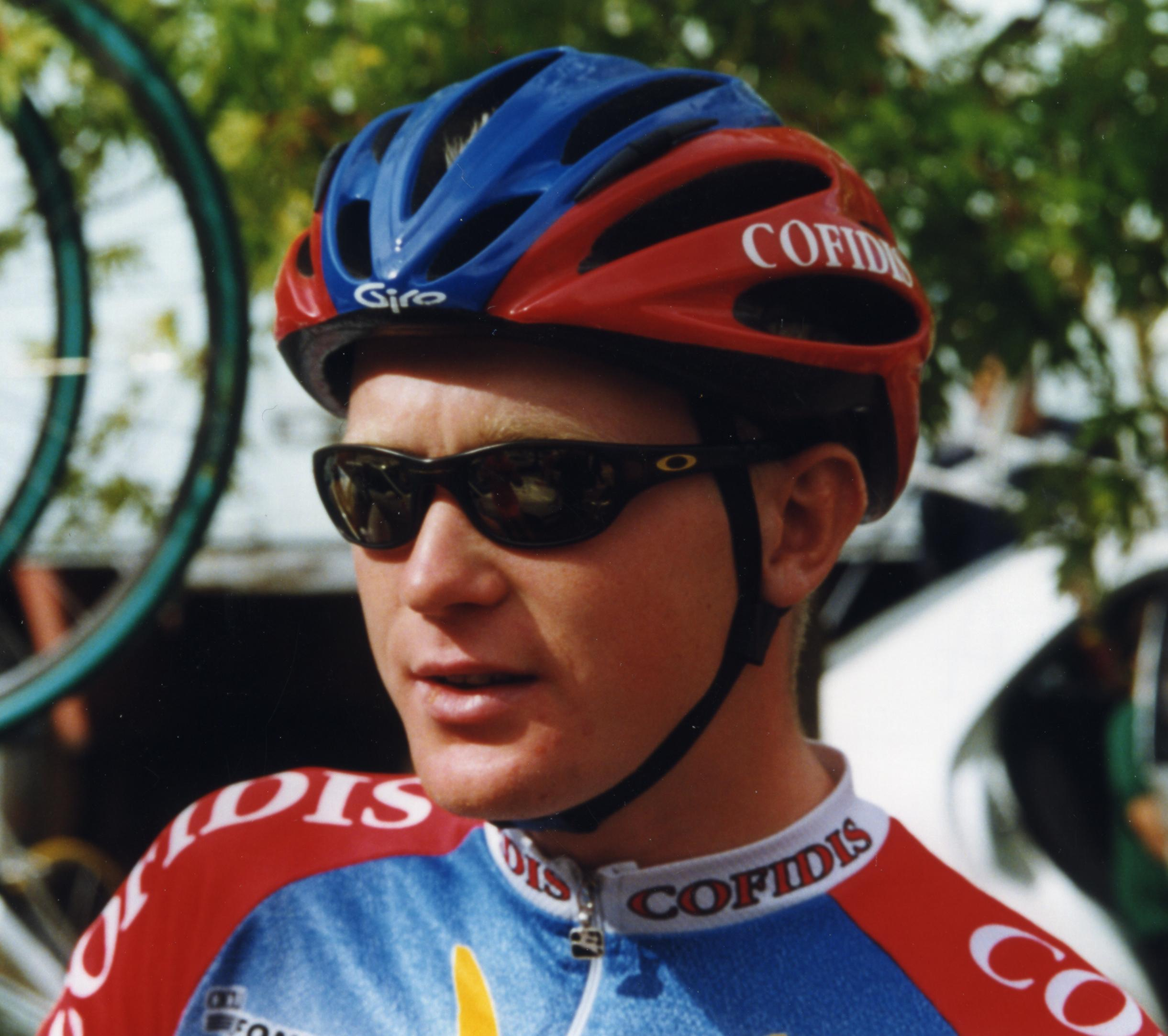

Personal information
- Full name: Janek Tombak
- Born: July 22, 1976 (age 50) Põltsamaa, then part of Estonian SSR, Soviet Union
- Height: 1.72 m (5 ft 8 in)
- Weight: 71 kg (157 lb)

Cycling career
- Sport: Cycling
- Discipline: Road
- Role: Rider

Amateur teams
- 1997–1998: Vendée U
- 1998: Cofidis (stagiaire)
- 2013: Amicale Cysliste Bisontine

Professional teams
- 1999–2005: Cofidis
- 2006: Kalev Chocolate Team
- 2006–2008: Jartazi–7Mobile
- 2009: Cycling Club Bourgas
- 2012: Geofco–Ville d'Alger

Janek Tombak (born 22 July 1976) is an Estonian former professional road cyclist. He won the Estonian national championships twice (2001, 2003) and finished in 10th place at the 2003 UCI Road World Championships.

== Major results ==
1994
1st Overall Tour de Lorraine
1996
2nd Road race, National Road Championships
1998
2nd Road race, National Road Championships
2000
1st Stages 3 and 4a Hessen Rundfahrt
1st Stage 6 Tour de l'Avenir
3rd Road race, National Road Championships
2001
1st Road race, National Road Championships
3rd GP Rudy Dhaenens
6th Overall Guldensporentweedaagse

1st Stage 2

6th Boucles de l'Aulne
9th GP Ouest France-Plouay
9th Route Adélie
2002
1st Stages 1 & 2 GP Mosqueteiros
1st Stage 2 Four Days of Dunkirk
1st Stage 2 Gran Premio Minho
1st Stage 3 Tour de Pologne
2nd GP Stad Zottegem
2nd Tartu Grand Prix
7th Trophée des Grimpeurs
8th E.O.S. Tallinn GP
2003
National Road Championships

1st Road race
3rd Time trial

1st Stage 1 Route du Sud
2nd Tour du Doubs
2nd Tartu Grand Prix
6th Paris–Bourges
7th Le Samyn
9th Grand Prix de Wallonie
10th Road race, UCI Road World Championships
2004
1st Stage 3 Danmark Rundt
1st Points classification Tour of Belgium
2nd Road race, National Road Championships
7th E.O.S. Tallinn GP
8th Brabantse Pijl
9th Tartu GP
2005
1st Overall Tour de Picardie
1st E.O.S. Tallinn GP
9th Trophée des Grimpeurs
2006
1st E.O.S. Tallinn GP
9th Riga GP
10th Tartu GP
2007
1st Halle–Ingooigem
2nd Overall Tour de Picardie

1st Stage 4

2nd Grote Prijs Jef Scherens
3rd Omloop der Kempen
3rd Cholet-Pays de Loire
3rd Tartu GP
5th Druivenkoers Overijse
6th Paris–Brussels
7th Overall Boucles de la Mayenne

1st Stage 3

7th Overall Paris–Corrèze
7th Internatie Reningelst
8th Schaal Sels
2008
1st Cholet-Pays de Loire
2nd Grote Prijs Jef Scherens
2nd Grand Prix de la Somme
2nd Tartu Grand Prix
4th Road race, National Road Championships
5th E3 Harelbeke
8th Druivenkoers Overijse
2009
1st Overall Kreiz Breizh Elites
1st Overall Boucles de la Mayenne
3rd Tartu Grand Prix
5th Overall Boucle de l'Artois
10th Halle–Ingooigem
