= Jonas Holmkvist =

Swedish cyclist

Personal information
- Born: 17 August 1982 (age 44) Halmstad, Sweden

Cycling career
- Sport: Cycling
- Current team: Retired
- Discipline: Road
- Role: Rider

Professional teams
- 2001–2002: Crescent
- 2003–2004: Bianchi Scandinavia
- 2005: Amore & Vita-Beretta

Jonas Holmkvist (born 17 August 1982) is a former Swedish cyclist.

== Palmares ==
2002
1st National Team Time Trial Championships (with Erik Wendel and Gustav Larsson)
1st Scandinavian Open Road Race
2003
1st National Road Race Championships
1st Overall Ringerike GP

1st Stages 1 & 4

1st Stages 2 & 6 FDB Insurance Rás
2004
1st Stage 5 Course de la Solidarité Olympique
2005
8th Classic Loire Atlantique
9th Tour du Finistère
