= Kalle Kriit =

Estonian cyclist

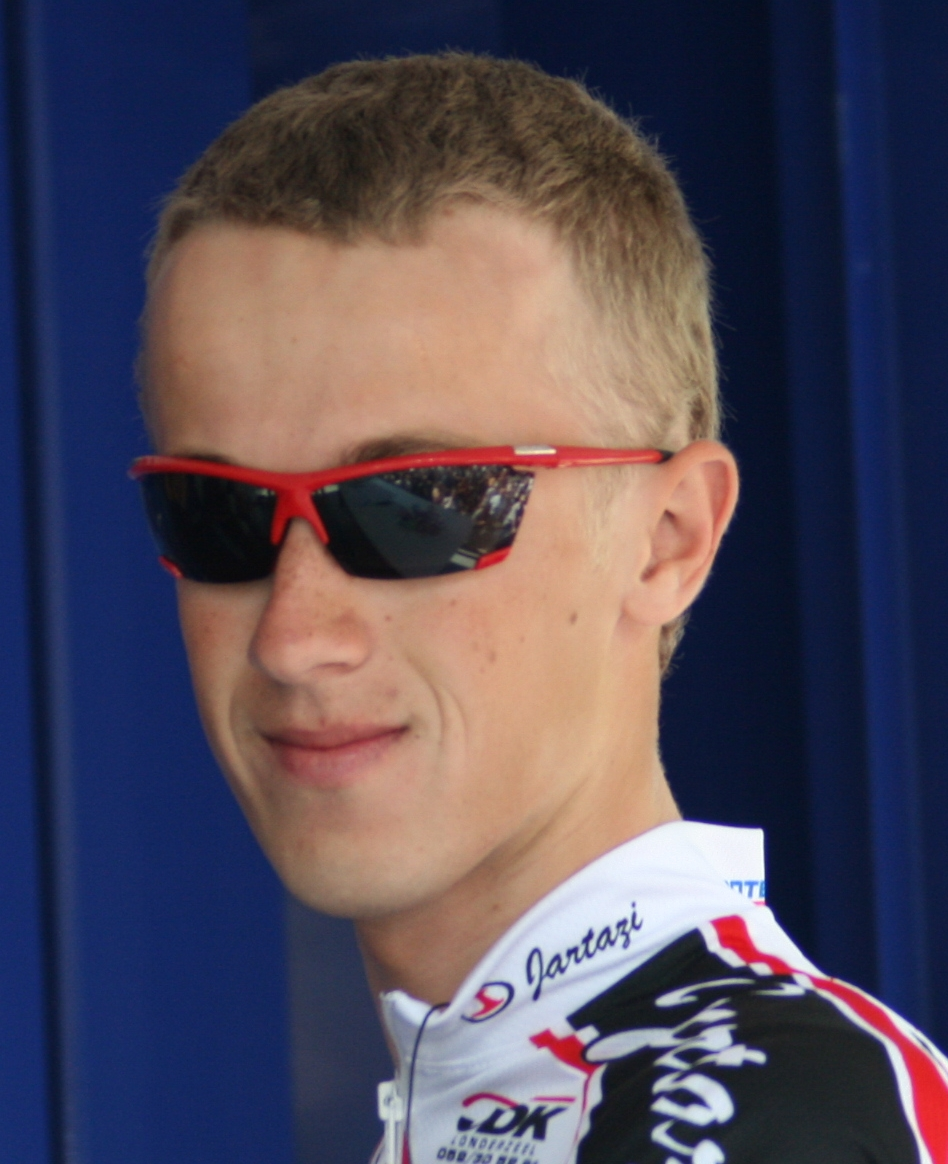
- Kriit in 2008

Personal information
- Full name: Kalle Kriit
- Nickname: Estonian Emperor
- Born: 13 November 1983 (age 42) Elva, then part of Estonian SSR, Soviet Union
- Height: 1.81 m (5 ft 11 1/2 in)
- Weight: 63 kg (139 lb)

Cycling career
- Sport: Cycling
- Disciplines: Road, Mountain biking
- Role: Rider

Amateur teams
- 2005–2007: Roue d'or St Amandoise
- 2009: AVC Aix
- 2009: Vooremaa Centrum

Professional teams
- 2008: Mitsubishi–Jartazi
- 2010–2011: Cofidis

Kalle Kriit (born 13 November 1983 in Elva) is an Estonian professional racing cyclist who last rode for UCI Professional Continental Team Cofidis. His nickname is Estonian Emperor.

== Major results ==
2002
1st Under-23 National Road Race Championships
2005
1st Under-23 National Road Race Championships
2007
1st Overall Kreiz Breizh Elites

1st Stages 1, 3 & 4

2008
2nd National Road Race Championships
5th Trophée des Grimpeurs
8th Tartu GP
2010
1st National Road Race Championships
9th Grand Prix d'Ouverture la Marseillaise
