= Erki Pütsep =

Estonian cyclist

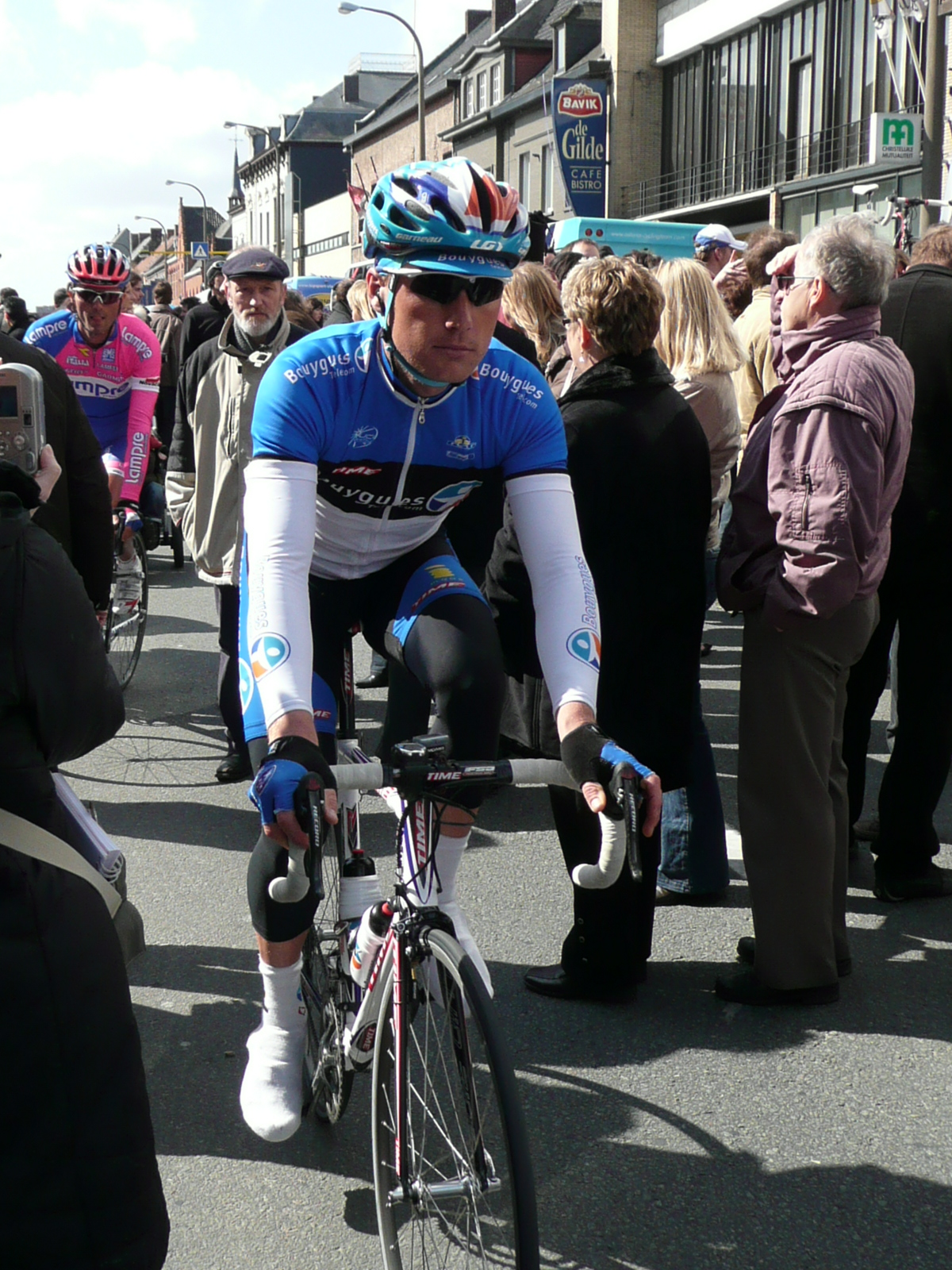
- Pütsep at the 2008 E3-Prijs Vlaanderen

Personal information
- Full name: Erki Pütsep
- Born: 25 May 1976 (age 50) Jõgeva, then part of Estonian SSR, Soviet Union
- Height: 1.76 m (5 ft 9 in)
- Weight: 68 kg (150 lb)

Cycling career
- Sport: Cycling
- Discipline: Road
- Role: Rider

Amateur teams
- 2002: EC St Etienne Loire
- 2002: AG2R Prévoyance (stagiaire)

Professional teams
- 2003–2006: AG2R Prévoyance
- 2007–2008: Bouygues Télécom
- 2009: Cycling Club Bourgas
- 2010: Kalev Chocolate Team
- 2011–2013: Alpha Baltic–Unitymarathons.com

Major wins
- E.O.S. Tallinn GP (2007, 2009); Estonian National Road Race Champion (2004, 2006, 2007); Baltic Chain Tour 2011

Erki Pütsep (born 25 May 1976) is an Estonian professional road bicycle racer who last rode for the Alpha Baltic–Unitymarathons.com team. He is the three time national road race champion (2004, 2006 and 2007) and won the E.O.S. Tallinn GP in 2007. In 2011 he won Baltic Chain Tour, which was held in Lithuania, Latvia and Estonia.

== Major results ==
2001
2nd Classic Loire Atlantique
2002
1st Stage 2 Tour de Corrèze
2nd Bordeaux-Saintes
3rd Tallinn GP
6th Classic Loire Atlantique
9th Tartu GP
2003
3rd National Road Race Championships
7th Tartu GP
2004
1st National Road Race Championships
1st Classic Loire Atlantique
8th Tro-Bro Léon
10th Tartu GP
10th EOS Tallinn GP
2005
1st Overall Tour de la Somme

1st Stage 1

2nd EOS Tallinn GP
2nd National Road Race Championships
2nd Duo Normand (with Yuriy Krivtsov)
9th Tartu GP
10th Cholet-Pays de Loire
2006
1st National Road Race Championships
4th GP de Denain
6th Cholet-Pays de Loire
8th Gent–Wevelgem
10th Route Adélie
2007
1st National Road Race Championships
1st EOS Tallinn GP
1st Ühispanga Tartu GP
2008
2nd Tallinn–Tartu GP
2nd Riga Grand Prix
3rd Tartu GP
3rd National Road Race Championships
2009
1st Tallinn–Tartu GP
3rd National Road Race Championships
3rd Grand Prix de la Ville de Nogent-sur-Oise
6th Classic Loire Atlantique
2010
3rd Tallinn–Tartu GP
3rd Mémorial Danny Jonckheere
2011
1st Overall Baltic Chain Tour
7th Tallinn–Tartu GP
9th Scandinavian Race Uppsala
2012
2nd Riga Grand Prix
4th Tour of Vojvodina II
5th Tartu GP
6th Tour of Vojvodina I
8th Central European Tour Budapest GP
