= Liisa Ehrberg =

Estonian cyclist

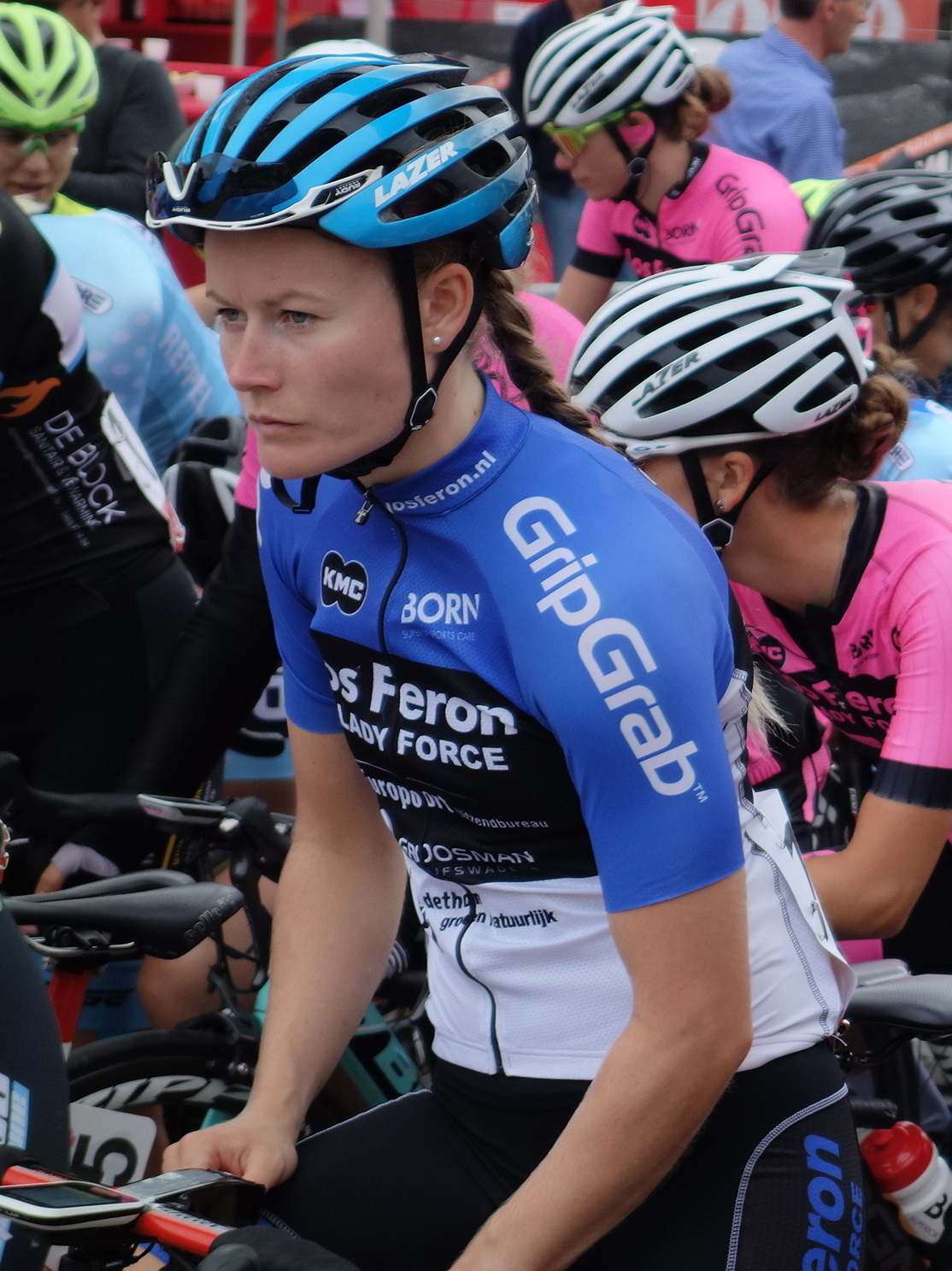
- Ehrberg at the 2019 Belgium Tour

Personal information
- Born: 17 December 1988 (age 37) Estonian SSR, Soviet Union

Cycling career
- Sport: Cycling
- Disciplines: Road; Mountain biking
- Role: Rider

Amateur teams
- 2009: USC Chirio Forno d'Asolo (stagiaire)
- 2010: ACS Chirio–Forno d'Asolo (stagiaire)
- 2015: Tre Colli–Forno d'Asolo
- 2017–2019: Jos Feron Lady Force
- 2020: Isorex No Aqua Ladies Team

Major wins
- One-day races and Classics National Road Race Championships (2015, 2018, 2019) National Time Trial Championships (2009)

Liisa Ehrberg (born 17 December 1988) is an Estonian racing cyclist. She rode at the 2014 UCI Road World Championships.

== Major results ==
2007
4th Time trial, National Road Championships
2008
National Road Championships

3rd Time trial
3rd Road race

2009
National Road Championships

1st Time trial
2nd Road race

2010
National Road Championships

2nd Time trial
2nd Road race

2012
National Road Championships

3rd Road race
4th Time trial

2013
National Road Championships

3rd Road race
4th Time trial

3rd Cross-country marathon, National Mountain Bike Championships
2014
2nd Road race, National Road Championships
2015
National Road Championships

1st Road race
2nd Time trial

1st Cross-country marathon, National Mountain Bike Championships
2016
National Mountain Bike Championships

1st Cross-country marathon
3rd Cross-country

National Road Championships

2nd Time trial
5th Road race

2017
National Road Championships

3rd Time trial
10th Road race

2018
National Road Championships

1st Road race
4th Time trial

2019
National Road Championships

1st Road race
6th Time trial

3rd Cross-country marathon, National Mountain Bike Championships
2021
3rd Road race, National Road Championships
2022
3rd Cross-country marathon, National Mountain Bike Championships
10th Cross-country marathon, European Mountain Bike Championships
