= Tony Bracke =

Belgian cyclist (born 1971)

Personal information
- Full name: Tony Bracke
- Born: 15 December 1971 (age 54) Ghent, Belgium

Cycling career
- Sport: Cycling
- Current team: Retired
- Discipline: Road
- Role: Rider

Amateur team
- 2001: Janotas & Simões

Professional teams
- 1996: Lotto
- 1997: Ipso–Euroclean
- 1998–2001: Collstrop
- 2002: Palmans–Collstrop
- 2003–2005: Landbouwkrediet–Colnago
- 2006–2007: Yawadoo–Colba–ABM

Tony Bracke (born 15 December 1971) is a Belgian former road cyclist.

== Major results ==
1995
1st Flèche Ardennaise
1996
1st Grote Prijs Beeckman-De Caluwé
1998
1st Boucles de Seine Saint-Denis
1st Memorial Thijssen
1999
1st Stadsprijs Geraardsbergen
2000
1st Grote 1-MeiPrijs
Tour de Wallonie

1st Stages 2 & 4

2001
4th Brussels–Ingooigem
2003
5th Paris–Bruxelles
2006
1st Stage 1 Tour de la Province de Namur
2007
1st Road race, National Amateur Road Championships
