= Marco Zamparella =

Italian cyclist

Personal information
- Born: 1 October 1987 (age 39) San Miniato, Italy
- Height: 177 cm (5 ft 10 in)
- Weight: 67 kg (148 lb)

Cycling career
- Sport: Cycling
- Current team: Amore & Vita
- Discipline: Road
- Role: Rider

Professional teams
- 2013: Utensilnord Ora24.eu
- 2015–: Amore & Vita–Selle SMP

Marco Zamparella (born 1 October 1987 in San Miniato) is an Italian cyclist riding for Amore & Vita.

== Major results ==
2013
3rd Coppa Agostoni
2016
1st Stages 6 & 8 Vuelta al Táchira
2017
1st Memorial Marco Pantani
