= Volodymyr Starchyk =

Ukrainian cyclist

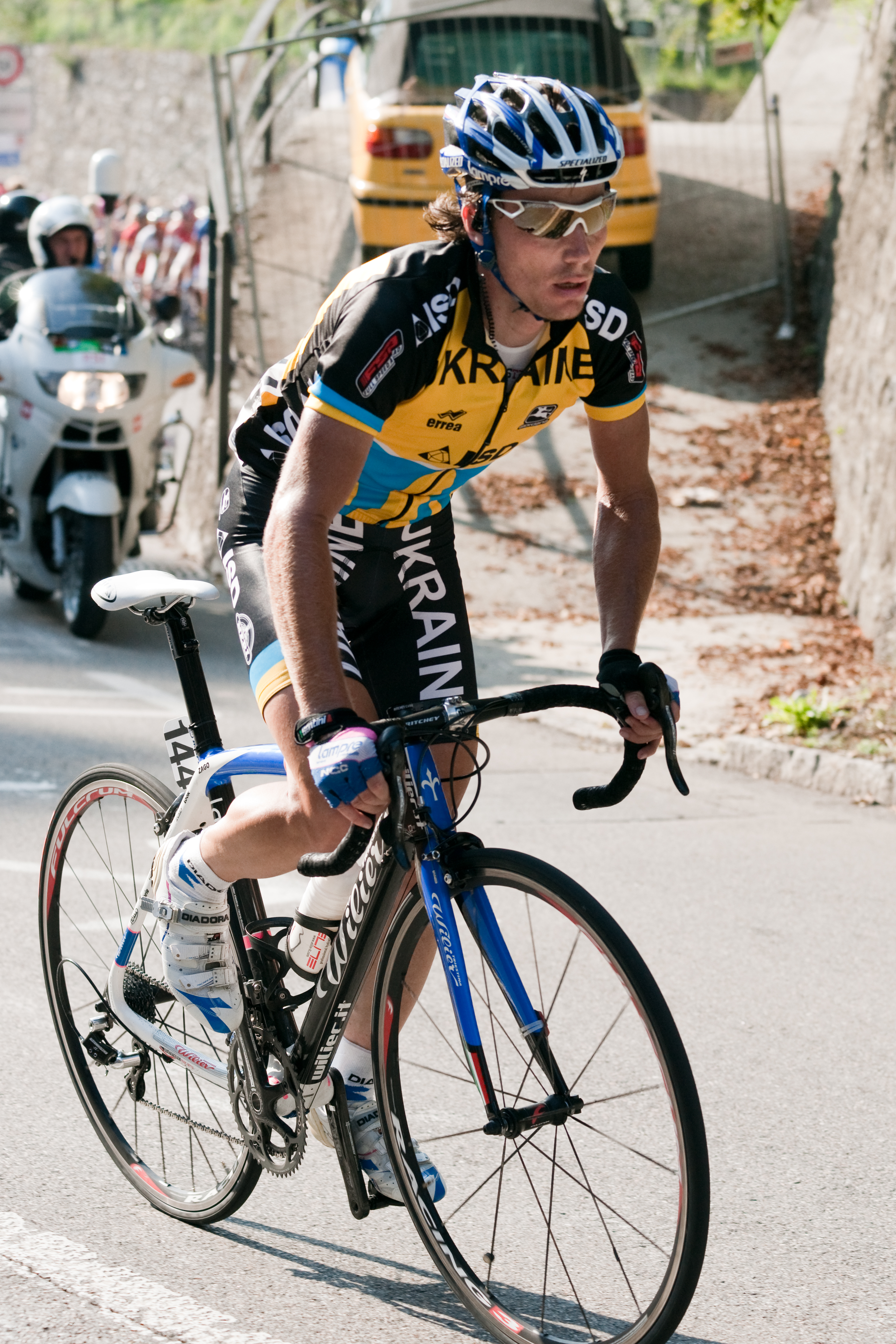
- Starchyk in 2009

Personal information
- Born: 13 April 1980 (age 46) Ukrainian SSR, Soviet Union

Cycling career
- Sport: Cycling
- Current team: Retired
- Discipline: Road
- Role: Rider

Professional teams
- 2007: MapaMap-BantProfi
- 2008: Dynatek-Latvia
- 2009–2010: Amore & Vita–McDonald's
- 2011: Lampre–ISD (until 31/7)
- 2012: Uzbekistan Suren Team
- 2013: Amore & Vita

Volodymyr Andriyovych Starchyk (Ukrainian: Володимир Андрійович Старчик; born 13 April 1980) is a former Ukrainian racing cyclist.

== Palmares ==
2001
1st Coppa Collecchio
2002
1st Stage 2 Giro delle Regioni
2003
1st Stage 2 Vuelta a la Comunidad de Madrid
2004
3rd Tour of Romania
2006
2nd National Road Race Championships
2008
1st Stage 2 Tour of Bulgaria
2009
National Road Race Champion
1st Univest Grand Prix

1st Stages 1 (TTT) & 2

2nd Szlakiem Grodów Piastowskich
