= Markus Pajur =

Estonian cyclist

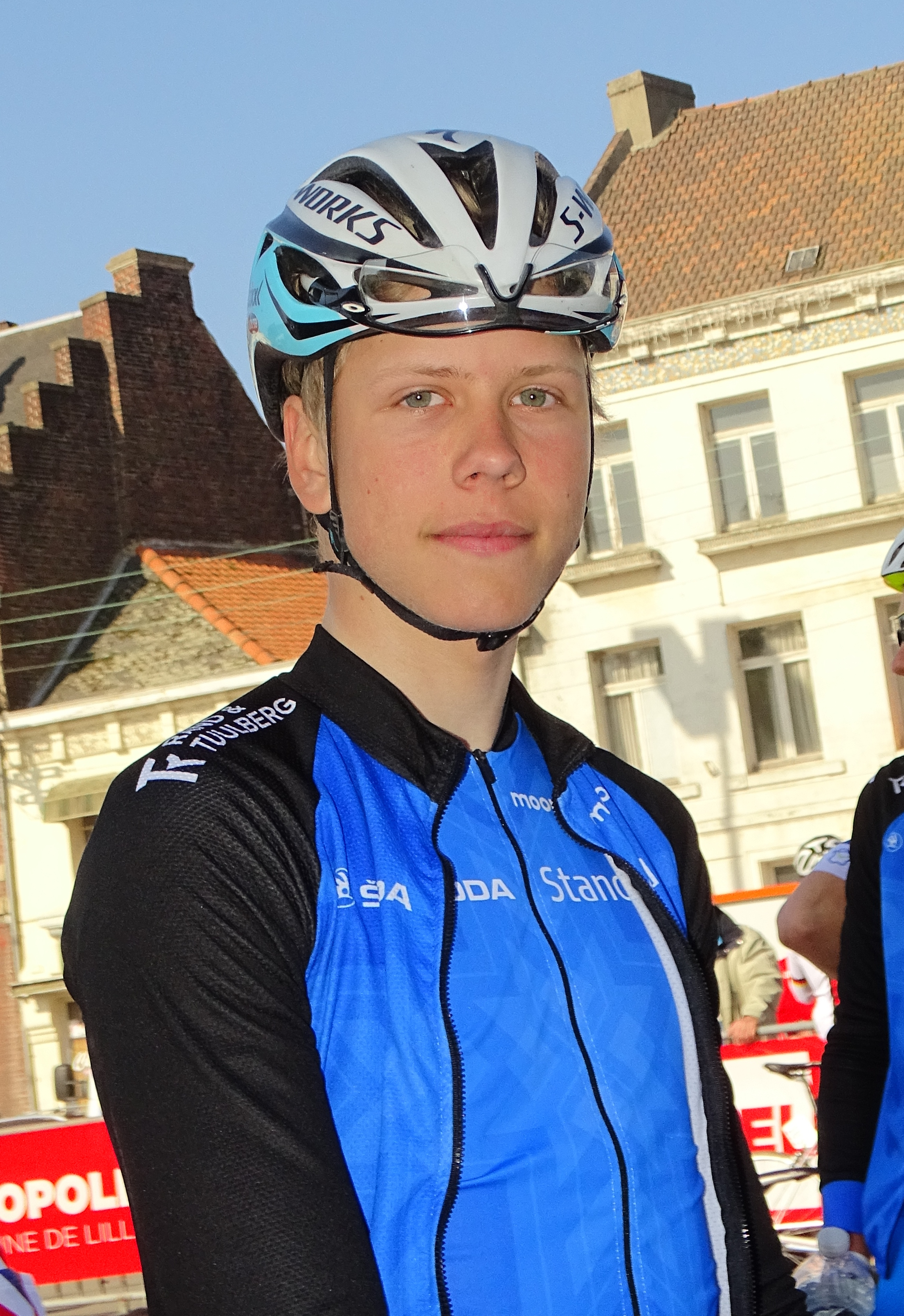
- Pajur in 2017

Personal information
- Born: 23 September 2000 (age 26) Kiili, Estonia
- Height: 1.85 m (6 ft 1 in)
- Weight: 72 kg (159 lb)

Cycling career
- Sport: Cycling
- Current team: FNIX–SCOM–Hengxiang Cycling Team
- Discipline: Road
- Role: Rider

Amateur teams
- 2024: EC Saint-Étienne Loire
- 2025: Charvieu-Chavagneux IC

Professional teams
- 2020: Tartu2024–BalticChainCycling.com
- 2021–2022: Arkéa–Samsic
- 2023: Tartu2024 Cycling Team
- 2026–: FNIX–SCOM–Hengxiang Cycling Team

Markus Pajur (born 23 September 2000) is an Estonian cyclist, who currently rides for UCI Continental team FNIX–SCOM–Hengxiang Cycling Team.

== Major results ==
2018
3rd Road race, National Junior Road Championships
2019
6th Memorial Grundmanna I Wizowskiego
9th Memoriał Henryka Łasaka
2020
2nd Puchar Ministra Obrony Narodowej
3rd Time trial, National Road Championships
4th Road race, European Under-23 Road Championships
6th Carpathian Couriers Race
9th Overall Baltic Chain Tour
2021
4th Road race, National Road Championships
4th Road race, National Under-23 Road Championships
2022
National Under-23 Road Championships

2nd Road race
5th Time trial

2023
2nd Memorial Fred De Bruyne
6th Grand Prix Cerami
10th Overall Baltic Chain Tour
2024
3rd Road race, National Road Championship
2025
1st Stage 3 Red Bull Tour of Vikings
4th Road race, National Road Championships
4th Overall Baltic Chain Tour

1st Stage 1b
