= Tanel Kangert =

Estonian road cyclist

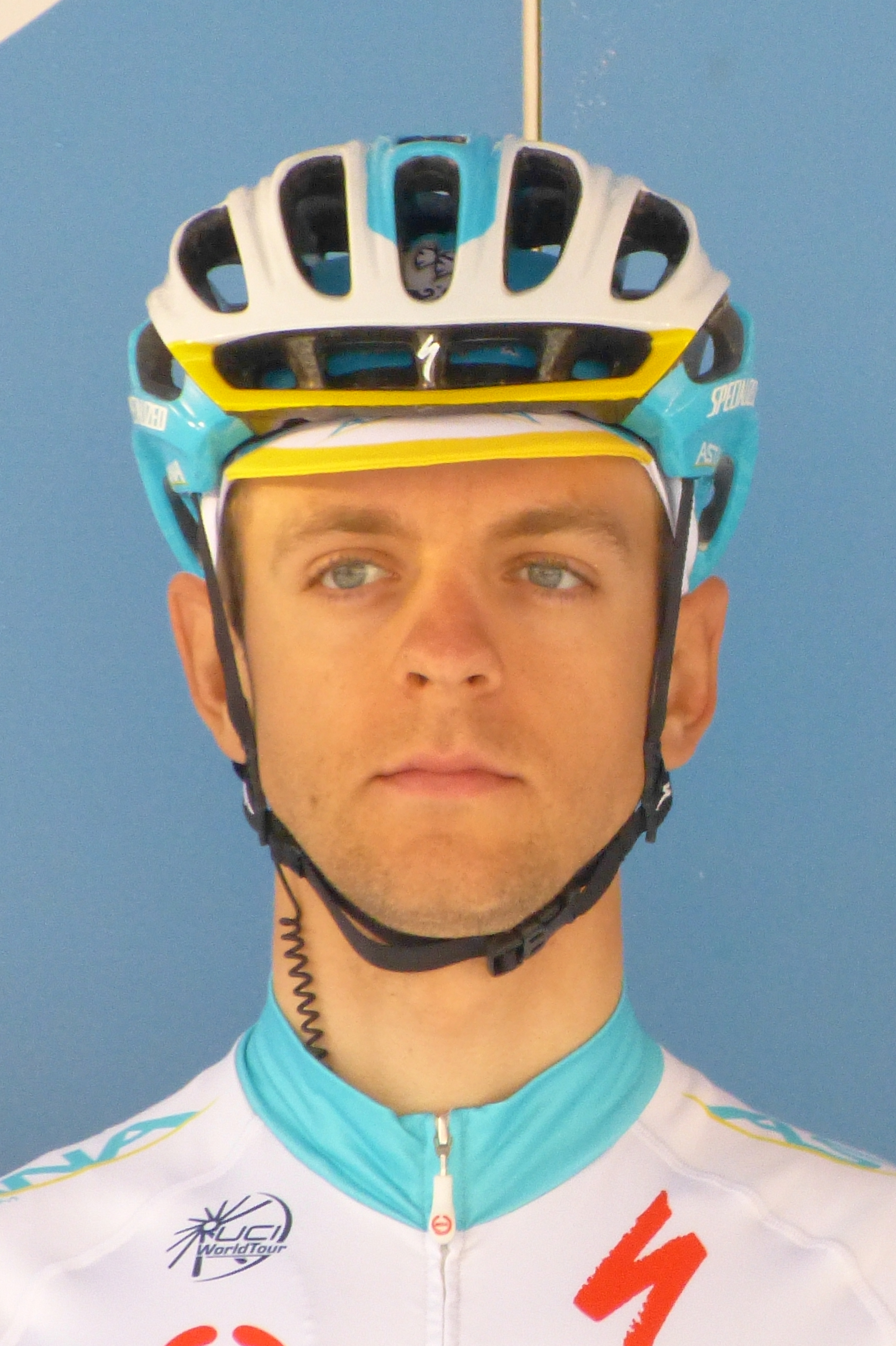
- Kangert at the 2013 Tour of the Basque Country

Personal information
- Full name: Tanel Kangert
- Born: 11 March 1987 (age 39) Vändra, then part of Estonian SSR, Soviet Union
- Height: 1.78 m (5 ft 10 in)
- Weight: 65 kg (143 lb; 10 st 3 lb)

Cycling career
- Sport: Cycling
- Current team: Retired
- Discipline: Road
- Role: Rider
- Rider type: Climber

Amateur teams
- 2006: UC Artisienne
- 2007: RO St-Amandandoise
- 2007: AG2R Prévoyance (stagiaire)
- 2010: EC Saint-Étienne Loire

Professional teams
- 2008–2009: Ag2r–La Mondiale
- 2011–2018: Astana
- 2019–2020: EF Education First
- 2021–2022: Team BikeExchange

Major wins
- Stage races Abu Dhabi Tour (2016) One-day races and Classics National Time Trial Championships (2008, 2010, 2013, 2018) National Road Race Championships (2012)

Tanel Kangert (born 11 March 1987) is an Estonian former road bicycle racer, who competed as a professional from 2008 to 2022.

== Early life ==
Kangert was born in Vändra, Estonia. He attended kindergarten alongside fellow Estonian cyclist Rein Taaramäe.

== Career ==
Kangert signed his first professional contract with Ag2r–La Mondiale in 2008, after riding with the team as a stagiaire in the 2007 season. In the same year, he finished first in the Estonian National Time Trial Championships. However, during 2008 he also suffered from severe pain in both of his knees, requiring surgery to allow them to move more naturally. This forced him to race as an amateur during the 2010 season.

In 2011, Kangert signed for the Kazakh team Astana. In 2012, he won the final stage of the Tour de Suisse, beating Jérémy Roy in a sprint after the pair had attacked from a breakaway group earlier in the race. In the same year, he also won the Estonian National Road Race Championships. Kangert was one of Vincenzo Nibali's main domestiques in the 2013 Giro d'Italia, finishing in 14th position himself, after which it was announced he would sign a 3-year extension to his contract at Astana. In 2016, Kangert finished second in the Giro del Trentino, two seconds behind Mikel Landa, after winning the final stage. In October of the same year, he won the Abu Dhabi Tour ahead of Nicolas Roche.

Kangert signed for American outfit EF Education First for the 2019 season. He signed for Team BikeExchange on a two-year contract for the 2021 season, in support of Simon Yates who had recently extended his contract with the team.

== Major results ==
2004
10th Overall Course de la Paix Juniors
2005
1st Overall Course de la Paix Juniors
3rd Overall Liège–La Gleize
2006
6th Overall Tour des Pyrénées
2007
1st Road race, National Under-23 Road Championships
1st Overall Tour du Gévaudan Languedoc-Roussillon

1st Stage 3

2nd Kreiz Breizh Elites
3rd Riga Grand Prix
7th Time trial, UCI Under-23 Road World Championships
8th Time trial, UEC European Under-23 Road Championships
9th Overall Les 3 Jours de Vaucluse
10th Coppa Placci
2008
1st Time trial, National Road Championships
4th Boucles de l'Aulne
2010
National Road Championships

1st Time trial
2nd Road race

1st Tartu GP
2011
3rd Road race, National Road Championships
2012
National Road Championships

1st Road race
2nd Time trial

1st Stage 9 Tour de Suisse
2013
1st Time trial, National Road Championships
1st Stage 1 (TTT) Vuelta a España
5th Grand Prix of Aargau Canton
6th Overall Tour de Suisse
9th Overall Tour de Pologne
2014
5th Overall Vuelta a Andalucía
9th Trofeo Serra de Tramuntana
2016
1st Overall Abu Dhabi Tour

1st Stage 3

2nd Overall Giro del Trentino

1st Stages 1 (TTT), 3 & 4

6th Vuelta a Murcia
9th Road race, Olympic Games
2018
1st Time trial, National Road Championships
Combativity award Stage 17 Tour de France
2019
7th Time trial, UCI Road World Championships
2020
2nd Ardèche Classic
4th Overall Tour des Alpes-Maritimes et du Var
8th Overall Paris–Nice
9th La Drôme Classic
2021
6th Overall Tour of Slovenia
2022
2nd Time trial, National Road Championships
10th Time trial, UEC European Road Championships

=== Grand Tour general classification results timeline ===
Grand Tour	2008	2009	2010	2011	2012	2013	2014	2015	2016	2017	2018	2019	2020	2021	2022
Giro d'Italia	—	—	—	—	26	13	—	13	23	DNF	DNF	18	32	21	—
Tour de France	—	—	—	—	—	—	20	22	26	—	16	27	—	—	—
Vuelta a España	—	—	—	63	—	11	DNF	—	—	—	—	—	—	—	—
Major stage race general classification results
Race	2008	2009	2010	2011	2012	2013	2014	2015	2016	2017	2018	2019	2020	2021	2022
Paris–Nice	—	—	—	—	—	—	—	—	26	39	—	—	8	—	—
Tirreno–Adriatico	—	—	—	—	—	—	23	—	—	—	35	29	25	—	—
Volta a Catalunya	—	—	—	66	—	—	—	64	19	—	—	40	NH	33	—
Tour of the Basque Country	—	—	—	—	44	27	—	—	—	—	—	—	NH	—	DNF
Tour de Romandie	—	—	—	—	—	—	33	—	—	41	21	17	NH	—	—
Critérium du Dauphiné	—	—	—	—	—	—	17	—	—	—	—	—	46	—	—
Tour de Suisse	14	—	—	32	18	6	—	—	—	—	11	—	NH	—	—

Legend
—	Did not compete
DNF	Did not finish
