= Eugenio Bani =

Italian cyclist (born 1991)

Personal information
- Born: 13 January 1991 (age 35) Pisa, Italy
- Height: 1.80 m (5 ft 11 in)
- Weight: 72 kg (159 lb)

Cycling career
- Sport: Cycling
- Current team: Retired
- Discipline: Road
- Role: Rider

Amateur teams
- 2011–2012: Caparrini–The Village–Vibert Italia
- 2013: Etruria–Vibert Italia–TSS–Amore & Vita
- 2014: Malmantile–Romano Gaini–Taccetti

Professional teams
- 2013: Amore & Vita (stagiaire)
- 2015–2016: Amore & Vita–Selle SMP
- 2017: RTS–Monton Racing Team

Eugenio Bani (born 13 January 1991 in Pisa) is an Italian former professional cyclist.

== Major results ==
2009
1st Stage 4 Giro di Toscana Junior
2nd Trofeo Buffoni
7th European Junior Road Race Championships
2016
1st Stage 4 Vuelta al Táchira
3rd GP Adria Mobil
4th Massawa Circuit
