= Faat Zakirov =

Russian cyclist (born 1974)

Personal information
- Born: 3 January 1974 (age 52) Andijan, USSR

Cycling career
- Sport: Cycling
- Current team: Retired
- Discipline: Road
- Role: Rider

Professional teams
- 2001: Amore & Vita–Beretta
- 2002: Ceramiche Panaria–Fiordo

Faat Zakirov (Russian: Фаат Закиров) (born 3 January 1974 in Andijan) is a former Russian cyclist.

== Palmares ==
2000
2nd Overall Tour of Bulgaria
2001
1st Overall Tour of Slovenia

1st Stages 3 & 6

2002
3rd Giro dell'Appennino
