= Classic Haribo =

French bike race

Race details
- Date: Mid February
- Region: South France
- English name: Haribo Classic
- Local name(s): Classic Haribo (in French)
- Discipline: Road
- Competition: UCI Europe Tour
- Type: Single-day

History
- First edition: 1994
- Editions: 13
- Final edition: 2006
- First winner: Erik Zabel (GER)
- Most wins: Jaan Kirsipuu (EST) (3 wins)
- Final winner: Arnaud Coyot (FRA)

Classic Haribo was a professional cycle road race held between Uzès and Marseille, in south France. In 2005 and 2006 the race was organised as a 1.1 event on the UCI Europe Tour, also being part of the Coupe de France de cyclisme sur route.

== Winners ==
Year	Country	Rider	Team
1994	Germany	Erik Zabel	Team Telekom
1995	Italy	Giuseppe Citterio	Aki Gipiemme
1996	France	Laurent Jalabert	ONCE
1997	France	Frederic Guesdon	Française des Jeux
1998	Estonia	Lauri Aus	Casino–Ag2r
1999	Australia	Stuart O'Grady	Crédit Agricole
2000	Estonia	Jaan Kirsipuu	AG2R Prévoyance
2001	Belgium	Hans Declercq	Lotto–Adecco
2002	Estonia	Jaan Kirsipuu	AG2R Prévoyance
2003	Estonia	Jaan Kirsipuu	AG2R Prévoyance
2004	Norway	Thor Hushovd	Crédit Agricole
2005	Belgium	Gorik Gardeyn	MrBookmaker.com–SportsTech
2006	France	Arnaud Coyot	Cofidis
