= Mark Scanlon (cyclist) =

Irish cyclist

Personal information
- Full name: Mark Scanlon
- Born: 10 October 1980 (age 46) Sligo, Ireland
- Height: 1.77 m (5 ft 10 in)
- Weight: 79 kg (174 lb)

Cycling career
- Sport: Cycling
- Discipline: Road
- Role: Retired

Amateur teams
- 1992–1995: Éire Óg CC
- 1996–1998: Sligo CC
- 1999: Rabobank Beloften
- 2000: CC Étupes
- 2001: VC Nantes 44
- 2001–2002: Vélo-Club La Pomme Marseille
- 2002: AG2R Prévoyance (stagiaire)

Professional teams
- 2003–2006: AG2R Prévoyance
- 2007: Toyota–United

Major wins
- National Elite Road Race Champion (2002, 2003); World Junior Road Race Champion (1998)

Mark Scanlon (born 10 October 1980) is an Irish former professional road racing cyclist, who was the first Irishman to ride in the Tour de France since 1993. He also competed in the 2004 Summer Olympics.

== Amateur career ==
Scanlon came to prominence when he won the junior race at the 1998 world road race championship, on his 18th birthday.

After winning the world championships, Scanlon signed for the Rabobank cycling team's development squad. He failed to break through because of injuries and he left in 2000. He joined CC Etupes in France and rode lesser French races. Linda McCartney Racing Team offered him a contract in 2001 but folded before he joined them. Scanlon continued to ride in France with VC Nantes 44 and then VC La Pomme Marseille. In 2002 he won the Irish road championship.

== Professional career ==
Scanlon signed for AG2R Prévoyance for 2003. He won a stage of that year's Tour of Denmark, leading the race for three days. He won the Irish championship again.

In 2004 Scanlon became the first Irishman in the Tour de France since Stephen Roche in 1993. He also represented Ireland in the 2004 Summer Olympics in the road race on the opening day of the Games. Scanlon was injured for much of 2005 and 2006 but rode the 2006 Giro d'Italia.

He left the AG2R Prévoyance team at the end of 2006, disillusioned with the amount of racing required in the ProTour. At the start of 2007, he rode for the Toyota-United team in the USA. In 2007 there were reports he had retired. Scanlon denied them, saying he would like to captain a third division Irish continental team but for the time being, he had taken a "step back from professional cycling."

== Major results ==
1997
2nd Overall Junior Tour of Ireland

1st Stages 8 & 9

1998
1st Road race, UCI World Junior Road Championships
1st Road race, National Junior Road Championships
1st Overall Junior Tour of Ireland

1st Stages 1, 8 & 9

1st Circuit Het Volk juniors
1999
2nd Overall Tour of Ulster
3rd Road race, National Road Championships
2000
1st Overall Belfast–Dublin–Belfast

1st Stages 1 & 2

Tour de Hokkaido

1st Stages 1 & 6
1st Points classification

3rd Road race, National Road Championships
2001
1st Stage 4 FBD Milk Rás
2nd Road race, National Road Championships
2002
1st Road race, National Road Championships
3rd Grand Prix d'Isbergues
10th Time trial, UCI Under-23 Road World Championships
2003
1st Road race, National Road Championships
5th Overall Danmark Rundt

1st Stage 1

6th GP Ouest–France
2004
1st Ühispanga Tartu GP
1st E.O.S GP de Tallinn
2nd GP de Denain
4th Trophée des Grimpeurs
2005
1st Stage 4 Circuit des Ardennes
2nd Road race, National Road Championships
3rd Overall Tour de la Somme
3rd Tour du Doubs
2006
5th Le Samyn

=== Grand Tour general classification results timeline ===
Grand Tour	2004	2005	2006
Giro d'Italia	—	—	DNF
Tour de France	89	—	—
Vuelta a España	—	—	—

Legend
—	Did not compete
DNF	Did not finish
