= Jaan Kirsipuu =

Estonian cyclist

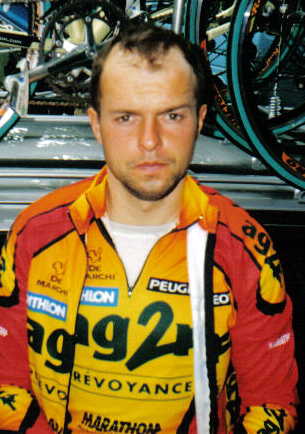

Personal information
- Full name: Jaan Kirsipuu
- Born: 17 July 1969 (age 57) Tartu, then part of Estonian SSR, Soviet Union

Cycling career
- Sport: Cycling
- Current team: Voltas–Tartu 2024 by CCN
- Discipline: Road
- Role: Rider (retired); Directeur sportif
- Rider type: Sprinter

Amateur teams
- 1990–1991: Dijon OC
- 1992: AC Boulogne-Billancourt
- 2007–2008: CFC–Ruutmeeter
- 2009: Geofco–Jartazi

Professional teams
- 1992–2004: Chazal–Vanille et Mûre
- 2005–2006: Crédit Agricole
- 2009: LeTua Cycling Team
- 2010–2012: CKT TMIT–Champion System

Managerial teams
- 2008: Rietumu Banka–Riga
- 2013–2014: Astana
- 2020–: Tartu2024–BalticChainCycling.com

Major wins
- Grand Tours Tour de France 4 individual stage wins (1999, 2001, 2002, 2004) Vuelta a España 1 individual stage win (1998) One-day races and Classics Kuurne–Brussels–Kuurne (2002)

Jaan Kirsipuu (born 17 July 1969) is an Estonian former road bicycle racer, who currently works as a directeur sportif for UCI Continental team Voltas–Tartu 2024 by CCN.

He spent the majority of his career riding under the management of Vincent Lavenu, initially joining Lavenu's Chazal–Vanille et Mûre team as a stagiaire and staying with the squad in its various incarnations for 12 years, taking a total of 124 race wins for the team. Kirsipuu initially retired at the end of the 2006, but participated in the 2007 Estonian championship, becoming time trial champion for the sixth time. In 2008 he was the manager of Latvian UCI Continental cycling team Rietumu Banka–Riga. In 2009 he joined LeTua Cycling Team. During his career, Kirsipuu got 115 professional wins and another 62 wins from criteriums and other non-professional races. He retired again in 2012, and became a sporting director with the Astana team.

At his peak he was one of Estonia's top athletes and the first Estonian rider to win a stage in the Tour de France. He dropped out of the Tour de France 12 times, which is the record. In spite of this, he won multiple stages and wore the yellow jersey for six days in 1999. This made him the only rider from Estonia to lead any of the three Grand Tours until Rein Taaramäe led the Vuelta for two days in 2021.

== Major results ==
1988
1st Road race, National Road Championships
1990
6th Overall Tour of Sweden

1st Stage 6

1992
1st Tro-Bro Léon
1st Stage 1 Paris–Bourges
3rd La Côte Picarde
1993
1st Grand Prix d'Isbergues
Quatre Jours de l'Aisne

1st Stages 1a, 1b & 5

1st Stage 4 4 Jours de Dunkerque
1st Stage 4 Tour de l'Avenir
3rd Grand Prix de Plumelec-Morbihan
1994
Quatre Jours de l'Aisne

1st Stages 2 & 5

1st Stage 4 Tour d'Armorique
1st Stage 4 Tour du Poitou Charentes et de la Vienne
3rd La Côte Picarde
1995
Tour du Poitou Charentes et de la Vienne

1st Stages 2 & 3

1st Stage 4a Quatre Jours de l'Aisne
2nd Grand Prix de Plumelec-Morbihan
1996
2nd Grand Prix de Plumelec-Morbihan
6th Grand Prix de Rennes
1997
1st Tour de Vendée
1st GP de Cholet-Pays-de-Loire
Tour du Poitou Charentes et de la Vienne

1st Stages 1 & 2

Tour de Pologne

1st Stage 3 & 4

1st Stage 5 Tour de Luxembourg
1st Stage 1 Giro di Puglia
2nd Classic Haribo
6th Omloop van het Waasland
6th Scheldeprijs
7th Omloop Het Volk
7th Grand Prix de Denain
1998
National Road Championships

1st Time trial
1st Road race

1st GP de Cholet-Pays-de-Loire
1st Route Adélie
1st Grand Prix de Villers-Cotterêts
1st GP de Denain Porte du Hainaut
1st Stage 3 Vuelta a España
1st Stage 5 Étoile de Bessèges
1st Stage 1 4 Jours de Dunkerque
1st Stage 3 Route du Sud
1st Stage 2 Tour du Poitou Charentes et de la Vienne
3rd Overall Circuit Cycliste Sarthe

1st Stages 1, 3 & 5

3rd Overall Giro di Puglia

1st Stages 1 & 3

3rd Tour de Vendée
3rd Paris–Tours
4th Kuurne-Brussels-Kuurne
8th Overall Tour de Picardie
1999
National Road Championships

1st Time trial
1st Road race

1st Coupe de France de cyclisme sur route
1st Overall Tour de Picardie

1st Stage 2b

1st GP de Cholet-Pays-de-Loire
1st Tour de Vendée
1st Tour de l'Oise
Étoile de Bessèges

1st Stages 4 & 5

4 Jours de Dunkerque

1st Stages 6 & 7

Tour de France

1st Stage 1
Held after Stage 2–7
Held after Stage 1–8

1st Stage 2 Paris–Nice
1st Stage 2 Tour Méditerranéen
1st Stage 3 Tour de Luxembourg
1st Stage 1b Tour of Sweden
1st Stage 5 Tour du Poitou Charentes et de la Vienne
1st Stage 3 Tour de Pologne
1st Stage 3 Giro della Provincia di Lucca
2nd GP de Denain Porte du Hainaut
3rd Paris–Tours
10th Route Adélie
2000
1st Classic Haribo
1st Tour de Vendée
Tour de Pologne

1st Stages 2, 3 & 4

1st Stage 1 Paris–Nice
1st Stage 5a Setmana Catalana de Ciclisme
1st Stage 7 4 Jours de Dunkerque
1st Stage 5 Danmark Rundt
National Road Championships

2nd Time trial
2nd Road race

2nd Overall Étoile de Bessèges

1st Stages 1, 3 & 6

3rd Kuurne–Brussels–Kuurne
8th Boucles de l'Aulne
9th Omloop Het Volk
9th GP de Denain Porte du Hainaut
9th Paris–Tours
2001
National Road Championships

1st Time trial
2nd Road race

1st Route Adélie
1st Grand Prix de Denain
1st Tartu Tänavasõit
1st Sadamast Sadamasse (Tallinn-Paldiski)
1st Stage 6 Tour de France
Tour Méditerranéen

1st Points classification
1st Stages 5 & 6

Circuit Cycliste de la Sarthe

1st Stages 2 & 3

1st Stage 2 Tour de Picardie
1st Stage 2 Tour de Luxembourg
1st Stage 2 Tour du Poitou Charentes et de la Vienne
1st Stage 1 Tour de Pologne
1st Stage 1 Giro della Provincia di Lucca
2nd Overall Danmark Rundt

1st Stage 6

2nd Gran Premio Bruno Beghelli
4th Dwars door Vlaanderen
6th Overall 4 Jours de Dunkerque

1st Stages 1, 2, 4 & 7

6th Paris–Brussels
7th Tour de Vendée
8th Kuurne–Brussels–Kuurne
8th Cholet-Pays de Loire
8th Paris–Tours
2002
National Road Championships

1st Time trial
1st Road race

1st Kuurne–Brussels–Kuurne
1st Classic Haribo
1st Tartu Tänavasõit
1st Stage 5 Tour de France
Étoile de Bessèges

1st Stages 4 & 5

6th Overall Danmark Rundt
7th Road race, UCI Road World Championships
2003
1st Time trial, National Road Championships
1st Coupe de France de cyclisme sur route
1st Gran Premio della Costa Etruschi
1st Classic Haribo
1st Tour de Vendée
1st GP Ühispanga Tartu
1st Overall Driedaagse van West-Vlaanderen

1st Stage 2

1st Stage 5 Étoile de Bessèges
1st Stage 3 4 Jours de Dunkerque
1st Stage 6 Danmark Rundt
1st Stage 3 Tour du Poitou Charentes et de la Vienne
2nd Scheldeprijs
6th Dwars door Vlaanderen
7th Cholet-Pays de Loire
7th E3 Prijs Vlaanderen
10th GP de la Ville de Rennes
2004
1st Time trial, National Road Championships
1st Stage 1 Tour de France
Étoile de Bessèges

1st Stage 2 & 5

1st Stage 4 Tour de la Région Wallonne
2nd Overall Driedaagse van West-Vlaanderen

1st Points classification
1st Stages 1 & 2

2nd Dwars door Vlaanderen
2nd E3 Prijs Vlaanderen
2nd Tour de Vendée
3rd Gent–Wevelgem
5th Tallinn–Tartu GP
6th Overall Tour de Picardie
9th Paris–Tours
2005
National Road Championships

1st Time trial
1st Road race

1st Stage 3 Tour de Pologne
1st Stage 3 Tour du Poitou Charentes et de la Vienne
7th Paris–Bourges
9th Châteauroux Classic
2006
1st Time trial, National Road Championships
Étoile de Bessèges

1st Stages 2 & 5

8th Classic Haribo
2007
National Road Championships

1st Time trial
2nd Road race

6th Tartu GP
7th Tallinn–Tartu GP
2008
1st Road race, National Road Championships
4th Riga GP
7th Tallinn–Tartu GP
2009
FDB Insurance Ras

1st Stages 3 & 8

Tour de Hokkaido

1st Stages 3 & 4

1st Stage 9 Tour du Cameroun
1st Stage 2 Herald Sun Tour
2nd Tallinn–Tartu GP
4th Time trial, National Road Championships
9th Overall Tour du Maroc

1st Stage 7

2010
2nd Tallinn–Tartu GP
3rd Road race, National Road Championships
6th Mumbai Cyclothon
8th Vice President Cup
2011
1st Jūrmala GP
1st Stage 4 Tour de Korea
4th Tallinn–Tartu GP
7th Tour de Mumbai I
2012
6th Jūrmala GP
