= Boucles de Seine Saint-Denis =

Race details
- Date: May
- Discipline: Road
- Competition: French Road Cycling Cup
- Type: One-day race

History
- First edition: 1998
- Editions: 1
- Final edition: 1998
- First winner: Tony Bracke (BEL)
- Final winner: Tony Bracke (BEL)

The Boucles de Seine Saint-Denis was a one-day road cycling race held only in 1998 in France as part of the French Road Cycling Cup.

== Result ==
Race result

1.	(Belgium) Tony Bracke	Collstrop	3h 57' 56"
2.	(France) Jimmy Casper	Française des Jeux	+ 2"
3.	(Estonia) Lauri Aus	Casino–Ag2r	+ 2"
4.	(Belgium) Jo Planckaert	Lotto–Mobistar	+ 2"
5.	(France) Éric Beaune	CC Nogent-sur-Oise	+ 2"
6.	(France) Sébastien Hinault	GAN	+ 2"
7.	(France) Olivier Perraudeau	GAN	+ 2"
8.	(France) Anthony Langella	GAN	+ 2"
9.	(France) Lylian Lebreton	BigMat–Auber 93	+ 2"
10.	(France) Claude Lamour	Mutuelle de Seine-et-Marne	+ 2"
