= Madis Mihkels =

Estonian cyclist (born 2003)

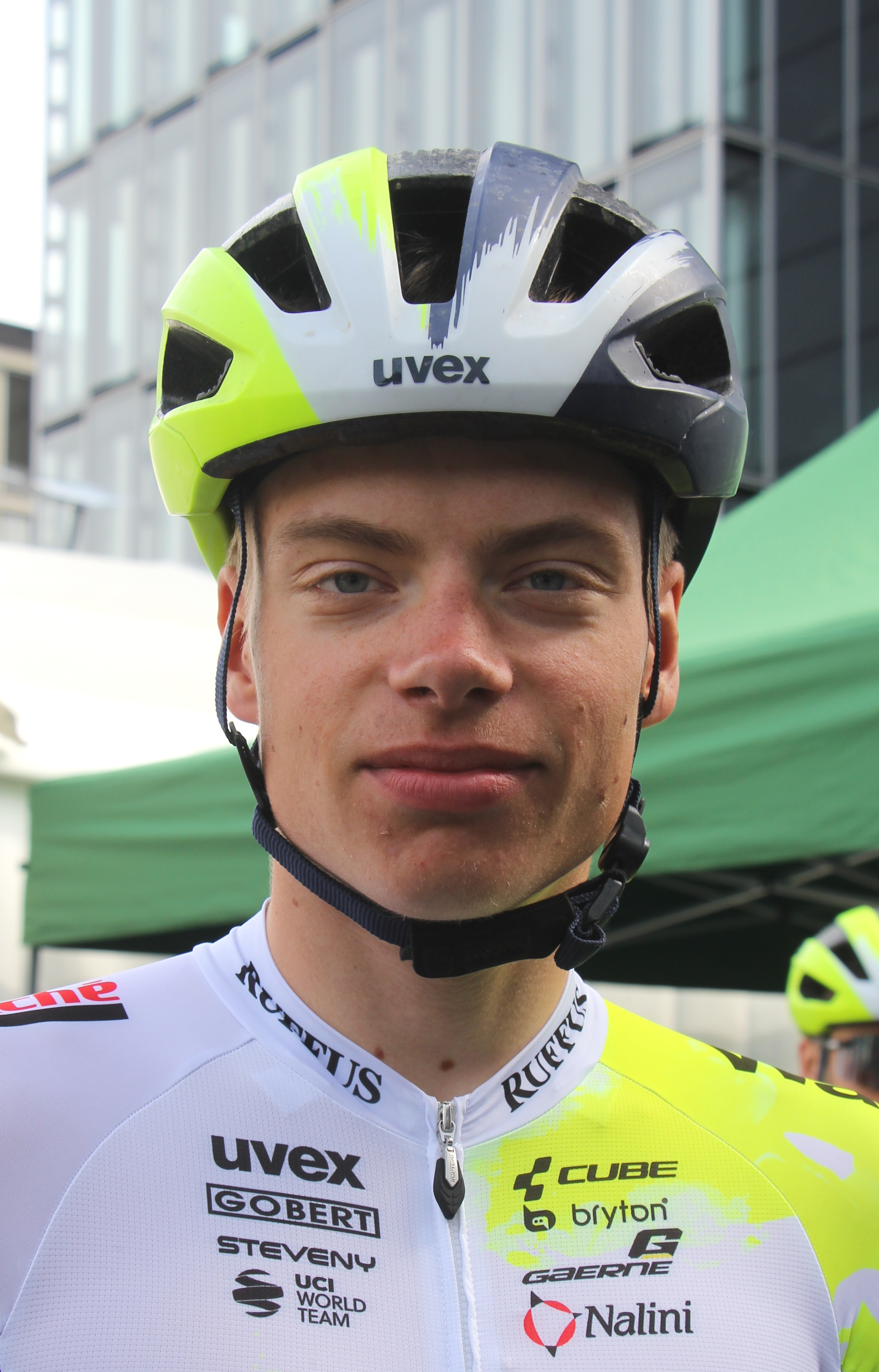
- Mihkels in 2023

Personal information
- Born: 31 May 2003 (age 23) Tartu, Estonia
- Height: 1.84 m (6 ft 0 in)
- Weight: 75 kg (165 lb)

Cycling career
- Sport: Cycling
- Current team: EF Education–EasyPost
- Disciplines: Road; Cyclo-cross
- Role: Rider

Professional teams
- 2022: Team Ampler–Tartu2024
- 2022: Intermarché–Wanty–Gobert Matériaux (stagiaire)
- 2023–2024: Intermarché–Circus–Wanty
- 2025–: EF Education–EasyPost

Major wins
- Single-day races and Classics National Road Race Championships (2025)
Medal record
Road cycling
Representing Estonia
World Championships
Bronze medal – third place	2021 Flanders	Junior road race
European Championships
Bronze medal – third place	2024 Limburg	Road race

Madis Mihkels (born 31 May 2003) is an Estonian racing cyclist, who currently rides for UCI WorldTeam EF Education–EasyPost. He turned professional in 2023 with Intermarché–Circus–Wanty on a two-year contract after spending the late part of the 2022 season with the team as a stagiaire.

In October 2023, Mihkels and Belgian rider Gerben Thijssen were pulled by their team from the Tour of Guangxi, after Mihkels made a racist gesture. Mihkels pulled his eyes into slants, in a picture Thijssen posted on his Instagram.

== Major results ==
=== Cyclo-cross ===
2019–2020
1st National Junior Championships
2020–2021
1st National Junior Championships
2021–2022
2nd National Under-23 Championships
2022–2023
1st Keila

=== Road ===
2020
National Junior Championships

2nd Road race
2nd Time trial

2021
National Junior Championships

1st Road race
1st Time trial

3rd Road race, UCI World Junior Championships
3rd Overall One Belt One Road Nation's Cup Hungary

1st Stages 1a & 1b

7th Road race, UEC European Junior Championships
2022 (1 pro win)
4th Road race, UCI World Under-23 Championships
4th Overall Tour of Estonia

1st Young rider classification
1st Stage 1

5th Grand Prix de la Somme
6th Overall Tour du Loir et Cher
6th Gran Piemonte
2023 (1)
1st Stage 3 Deutschland Tour
4th Road race, UEC European Under-23 Championships
8th Circuit de Wallonie
2024
3rd Road race, UEC European Championships
7th Kampioenschap van Vlaanderen
7th Surf Coast Classic
9th Scheldeprijs
10th Paris–Roubaix
2025 (1)
1st Road race, National Championships
3rd Classic Brugge–De Panne
9th Münsterland Giro

=== Grand Tour general classification results timeline ===
Grand Tour	2024	2025	2026
Giro d'Italia	112	—	111
Tour de France	—	—	
Vuelta a España	—	126	

Legend
—	Did not compete
DNF	Did not finish
