= Grete Treier =

Estonian cyclist

Personal information
- Full name: Grete Treier
- Born: 12 December 1977 (age 48) Tartu, then part of Estonian SSR, Soviet Union

Cycling career
- Sport: Cycling
- Discipline: Road
- Role: Rider

Grete Treier (born 12 December 1977) is an Estonian road bicycle racer.

She finished 30th in the road race at the 2008 Olympic Games, and 17th in the road race at the 2012 Olympic Games.
