= Arnaud Coyot =

French cyclist

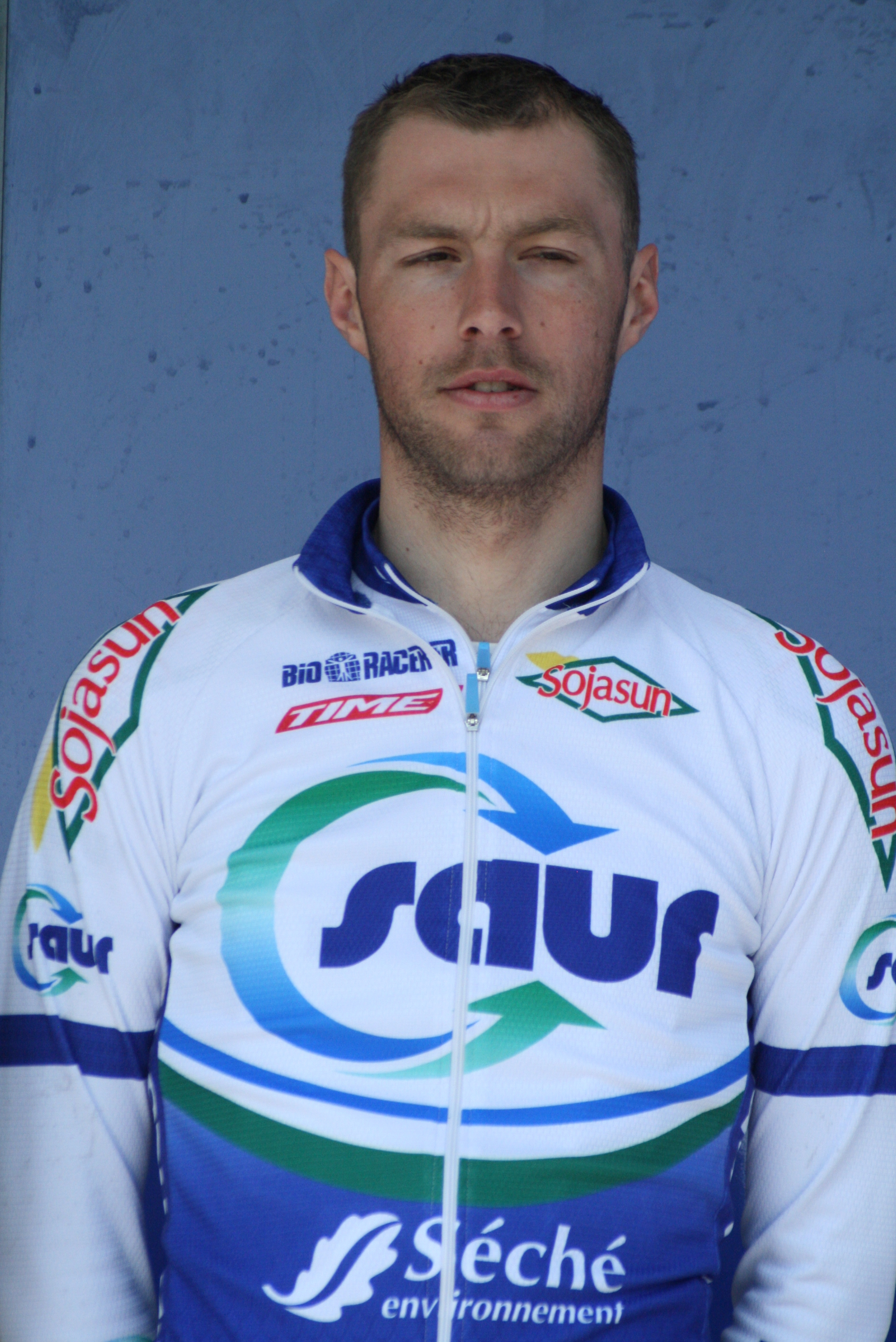

Personal information
- Full name: Arnaud Coyot
- Born: 6 October 1980 Beauvais, France
- Died: 24 November 2013 (aged 33) Amiens, France

Cycling career
- Sport: Cycling
- Discipline: Road
- Role: Rider

Professional teams
- 2003–2006: Cofidis
- 2007: Unibet.com
- 2008–2010: Caisse d'Epargne
- 2011–2012: Saur–Sojasun

Major wins
- Classic Haribo (2006); Baltic Grand Prix (2003)

Arnaud Coyot (French: [aʁno kojo]; 6 October 1980 – 24 November 2013) was a French road bicycle racer, who competed as a professional from 2003 to 2012. He had two race victories, and finished in tenth place in the 2005 Paris–Roubaix race, and tenth place in the 14th stage of the 2006 Tour de France.

Coyot died in a car accident; also traveling in the car at the time were his racing colleagues Sébastien Minard and Guillaume Levarlet, the latter of whom was driving.

== Major results ==
2003
1st GP EOS Tallinn
2005
10th Paris–Roubaix
2006
1st Classic Haribo
4th Grand Prix d'Ouverture La Marseillaise
