= Saaremaa Velotuur =

International cycling race competition

Saaremaa Velotuur ('Tour of Saaremaa') was a cycling competition which took place in Saare County, Estonia.

First competition was in 1957.

Last 20 years, the main organizer of the competition was Riho Räim.

== Winners ==
- 1957 Jaan Siiner
- 1958 Toivo Ladoga
- 1959 Arnold Perner
- 1975 Mikhel Joosep
- 1976 Oleg Ljadov
- 1977 Arno Lääne
- 1978 Uno Porgand
- 1979 Aavo Pikkuus
- 1980 Runo Ruubel
- 1981 Mallor Tyrna
