= Aidi Gerde Tuisk =

Estonian cyclist

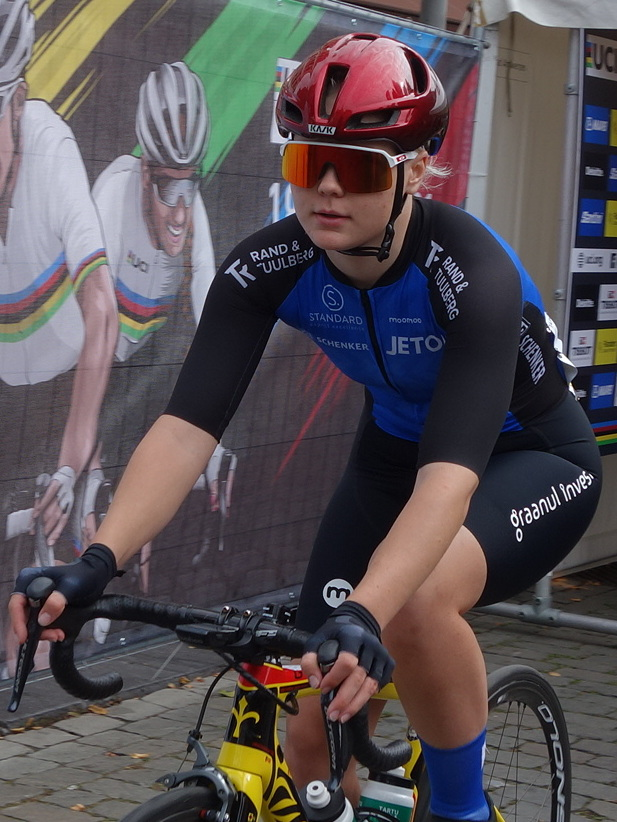
- Tuisk at the 2021 World Championships

Personal information
- Full name: Aidi Gerde Tuisk
- Born: 1 March 2002 (age 24) Tallinn, Estonia

Cycling career
- Sport: Cycling
- Current team: Eneicat–CMTeam
- Discipline: Road
- Role: Rider

Amateur team
- 2020: CFC Spordiklubi

Professional teams
- 2021–2022: Eneicat–RBH Global–Martín Villa
- 2024–: Team Coop–Repsol

Aidi Gerde Tuisk (born 1 March 2002 in Tallinn) is an Estonian professional racing cyclist, who currently rides for UCI Women's Team Hitec Products–Fluid Control.

== Major results ==
2018
2nd Debutant race, National Cyclo-cross Championships

2019
National Junior Road Championships

2nd Road race
2nd Time trial

2nd Junior race, National Cyclo-cross Championships

2020
1st Road race, National Road Championships
1st Time trial, National Junior Road Championships

2021
1st Road race, National Road Championships
3rd Time trial, National Road Championships

2022
1st Road race, National Road Championships
2nd Time trial, National Under-23 Road Championships
