= Amore & Vita =

European cycling team

Amore e Vita – KIBAG – Obor
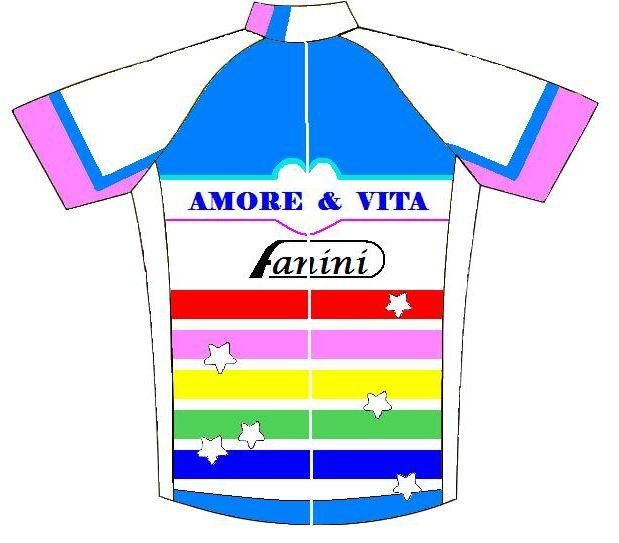

Team information
- UCI code: AMO
- Registered: Italy (1990–1998); United Kingdom (1999); Poland (2001–2008); United States (2009, 2022); Ukraine (2010–2016, 2021); Albania (2017–2018); Latvia (2019–2020); Ukraine (2021)
- Founded: 1989
- Disbanded: 2021
- Discipline: Road
- Status: Div. II: 1998–1999; Non-UCI: 2000; Div. II: 2001–2002; Div. III: 2003–2004; Continental: 2005–2021

Key personnel
- Team managers: Cristian Fanini; Volodymyr Starchyk; Reto Winter; Alessio Di Basco; Maurizio Giorgini; Marco Zamparella

Team name history
- 1989 1990–1992 1993–1995 1996–1998 1999–2000 2001–2005 2006–2009 2010 2011–2013 2014–2017 2018–2021: Polli-Mobiexport; Amore & Vita–Fanini; Amore & Vita–Galatron; Amore & Vita–ForzArcore; Amore & Vita–Giubileo 2000-Beretta; Amore & Vita–Beretta; Amore & Vita–McDonald's; Amore & Vita–Conard; Amore & Vita; Amore & Vita–Selle SMP; Amore & Vita–Prodir

Amore & Vita (UCI team code: AMO) was a UCI Continental cycling team founded in 1989 and disbanded in 2021

== Team history ==
The team's origins date to 1948 when Lorenzo Fanini founded an amateur cycling team. The team website states it is "the oldest professional cycling team in the world."

In 1984, the team turned professional and was renamed Fanini–Wührer.

In 1989, during an audience at the Vatican with Pope John Paul II, the manager, Ivano Fanini, had his riders appearing in jerseys with the slogan "No to Abortion".

Subsequently, the team was renamed Amore e Vita, "Love and Life" or "Love for Life".

Chad Gerlach rode with the team in 2009 after years of homelessness and addiction preceded by promising career.

In 2004, the team bikes featured a crucifix on the handlebars.

=== Doping violations ===
During the Tour de Suisse in 1999, Fanini fired Timothy Jones and Massimo Gimondi after they failed hematocrit tests.

Fanini offered David Millar and Jesús Manzano team spots in 2004 after they confessed to doping.

After Riccardo Riccò was fired by Vacansoleil for doping violations in 2011, Fanini offered him a spot on the team if he accepted "penitential confinement". The conditions included removing his earrings, piercings and the diamond embedded in his tooth. Both sides could not agree on the deal and Ricco joined Meridiana–Kamen.

On 6 June 2014, Luca Benedetti gave an adverse analytical finding for Darbepoetin (dEPO), was suspended from competing and later banned for life.

== Team roster ==
As of 5 March 2021.

Rider	Date of birth
Davide Appollonio (ITA)	2 June 1989 (age 37)
Mykola Kravchuk (UKR)	27 May 2000 (age 26)
Andrii Nepyivoda (UKR)	22 March 2000 (age 26)
Charly Petelin (LUX)	18 March 1994 (age 32)
Manuel Senni (ITA)	6 February 1992 (age 34)
Marco Tizza (ITA)	11 March 1992 (age 34)
Paolo Totò (ITA)	22 January 1991 (age 35)

Rider	Date of birth
Dmytro Volkov (UKR)	21 February 2002 (age 24)
Mykhailo Yanitskyi (UKR)	20 November 1999 (age 26)
Bogdan Zachepa (UKR)	7 June 1997 (age 29)
Anton Zaichenko (UKR)	16 May 1996 (age 30)
Vladislav Zubar (UKR)	11 May 1997 (age 29)
Antonio Zullo (ITA)	31 August 1993 (age 33)

== Major wins ==
1989
GP Industria & Artigianato di Larciano, Edward Salas
Trofeo Matteotti, Roberto Pelliconi
Trofeo Laigueglia, Pierino Gavazzi
Gran Premio Industria e Commercio di Prato, Pierino Gavazzi
1990
Stage 5 Giro d'Italia, Fabrizio Convalle
1992
Stage 1 Tour de Suisse, Alessio Di Basco
1993
Giro dell'Appennino, Giuseppe Calcaterra
1994
Stage 1 Tour de Suisse, Gianluca Pierobon
Overall Settimana Internazionale di Coppi e Bartali, Rodolfo Massi
Stage 15 Vuelta a España, Alessio Di Basco
Stage 18 Vuelta a España, Giuseppe Calcaterra
1996
Stage 2 Giro d'Italia, Glenn Magnusson
Stage 17 Giro d'Italia, Nicolaj Bo Larsen
1997
Denmark road race championships, Nicolaj Bo Larsen
Italy time trial championships, Dario Andriotto
Stage 5 Circuit de la Sarthe, Filippo Meloni
Overall Tour de Normandie, Glenn Magnusson
Stage 13 Giro d'Italia, Glenn Magnusson
Gran Premio Nobili Rubinetterie, Dario Andriotto
1998
Zimbabwe road race championships, Timothy Jones
Overall Tour de l'Ain, Cristian Gasperoni

Stage 3, Alessio Galletti

Stage 9 Giro d'Italia, Glenn Magnusson
1999
Stage 9 Vodacom Rapport Toer, Gilberto Zattoni
Overall Tour of Slovenia, Timothy Jones

Stage 5, Timothy Jones

Stage 10 Tour de Suisse, Maurizio De Pasquale
Gran Premio Industria e Commercio Artigianato Carnaghese, Mirko Puglioli
Stage 1b Tour de l'Ain, Artur Krzeszowiec
Stage 3 Tour de l'Ain, Mirko Puglioli
Stage 1 Tour du Limousin, Marco Cannone
2000
Stage 5 Tour of Slovenia, Seweryn Kohut
2001
Poreč Trophy III, Andrus Aug
Overall Tour of Slovenia, Faat Zakirov

Stage 2b & 5, Faat Zakirov
Stage 4, Seweryn Kohut

Stage 1 & 5 Course de la Solidarité Olympique, Andrus Aug
Stage 5 Tour of Bulgaria, Andrus Aug
Stage 6 Tour of Bulgaria, Sławomir Kohut
2002
Hungary road race championships, Balasz Rohtmer
South Africa time trial championships, James Perry
Stage 3 Tour of Bulgaria, Stefano Ciuffi
Stage 2b Herald Sun Tour, Jonas Ljungblad
2003
Stage 3 Settimana Ciclistica Lombarda, Timothy Jones
Stage 1a Course de la Solidarité Olympique, Mauro Zinetti
Stage 4b Course de la Solidarité Olympique, Marek Wesoły
Giro del Medio Brenta, Przemysław Niemiec
2004
Poland road race championships, Marek Wesoły
Finland road race championships, Kjell Carlström
Overall Giro d'Abruzzo, Aleksandr Kuschynski

Stage 1, Ivan Fanelli

Stage 1 Tour of Slovenia, Aleksandr Kuschynski
Stage 4 Tour of Slovenia, Jonas Ljungblad
Châteauroux Classic, Aleksandr Kuschynski
Overall Herald Sun Tour, Jonas Ljungblad

Stage 7, Jonas Ljungblad

Overall Tour of Queensland, Jonas Ljungblad

Stage 5 & 7, Jonas Ljungblad

2005
Sweden road race championships, Jonas Ljungblad
Belarus road race championships, Aleksandr Kuschynski
Tour du Lac Léman, Jonas Ljungblad
Stage 1 Szlakiem Grodów Piastowskich, Artur Krzeszowiec
Tour de Vendée, Jonas Ljungblad
Overall Boucles de la Mayenne, Aleksandr Kuschynski
Stage 2 Herald Sun Tour, Dainius Kairelis
Melbourne to Warrnambool Classic, Jonas Ljungblad
2006
Lithuania road race championships, Dainius Kairelis
Stage 4 Settimana Ciclistica Lombarda, Graziano Gasparre
Stage 1 Vuelta a Extremadura, Ivan Fanelli
2007
Stage 4 Settimana Ciclistica Lombarda, Ivan Quaranta
Giro d'Oro, Dainius Kairelis
2008
Eritrea road race championships, Daniel Teklehaimanot
Commerce Bank Lehigh Valley Classic, Yuriy Metlushenko
Stage 2 Tour de Beauce, Yuriy Metlushenko
Stage 3 Tour de Beauce, Miguel Martinez
2009
Ukraine road race championships, Volodymyr Starchyk
Stage 4 Settimana Internazionale di Coppi e Bartali, Yuriy Metlushenko
Stage 6 Tour of Qinghai Lake, Yuriy Metlushenko
Overall Univest GP, Volodymyr Starchyk

Stage 1, Team time trial
Stage 2, Volodymyr Starchyk

Stage 3 Tour of Hainan, Yuriy Metlushenko
2010
Slovakia road race championships, Jakub Novak
Stages 4 & 5 Tour of Qinghai Lake, Yuriy Metlushenko
Stage 1 Tour of Hainan, Yuriy Metlushenko
2011
Israel road race championships, Niv Libner
Mexico time trial championships, Bernardo Colex
Trophée de l'Anniversaire, Volodymyr Bileka
Trophée de la Maison Royale, Vladislav Borisov
Stage 6 Vuelta Chiapas, Bernardo Colex
2012
Stage 6 Tour of Bulgaria, Yovcho Yovchev
2013
Stage 5 Baltic Chain Tour, Mihkel Räim
2014
Stage 4 Tour de Beauce, Leonardo Pinizzotto
Israel road race championships, Niv Libner
Stages 11 & 13 Tour of Qinghai Lake, Mattia Gavazzi
Stage 2 Tour of China I, Mattia Gavazzi
Stage 1 Tour of China II, Mattia Gavazzi
Stage 3 Tour of Fuzhou, Mattia Gavazzi
2015
Stage 6 Vuelta Mexico Telmex, Mattia Gavazzi
Stage 2 Tour of Estonia, Mattia Gavazzi
Albania road race championships, Redi Halilaj
Stages 8, 10, 11 & 13 Tour of Qinghai Lake, Mattia Gavazzi
Overall Tour of China II, Mattia Gavazzi

Stages 1, 4 & 5, Mattia Gavazzi

Stages 1 & 3 Tour of Fuzhou, Mattia Gavazzi
2016
Stage 4 Vuelta al Táchira, Eugenio Bani
Stages 6 & 8 Vuelta al Táchira, Marco Zamparella
2017
Giro dell'Appennino, Danilo Celano
Fenkil Northern Red Sea Challenge, Pierpaolo Ficara
Stage 4 Tour of Eritrea, Redi Halilaj
Stage 1 Tour of Albania, Pierpaolo Ficara
Stage 2 Tour du Jura, Pierpaolo Ficara
Memorial Marco Pantani, Marco Zamparella
2019
Stage 3 Sibiu Cycling Tour, Marco Tizza
Stage 1 Volta a Portugal, Davide Appollonio
Stage 5 Volta a Portugal, Marco Tizza
Stage 2 Tour of Almaty, Danilo Celano
2020
Latvia road race championships, Viesturs Lukševics

2022 3rd GC Tour of Malta Johannes Glameyer

== National championships ==
1997
Denmark road race championships, Nicolai Bo Larsen
Italy time trial championships, Dario Andriotto
1998
Zimbabwe road race championships, Timothy Jones
2002
Hungary road race championships, Balasz Rohtmer
South Africa time trial championships, James Perry
2004
Poland road race championships, Marek Wesoły
Finland road race championships, Kjell Carlström
2005
Sweden road race championships, Jonas Ljungblad
Belarus road race championships, Aleksandr Kuschynski
2006
Lithuania road race championships, Dainius Kairelis
2008
Eritrea road race championships, Daniel Teklehaimanot
2009
Ukraine road race championships, Volodymyr Starchyk
2010
Slovakia road race championships, Jakub Novak
2011
Israel road race championships, Niv Libner
Mexico time trial championships, Bernardo Colex
2014
Israel road race championships, Niv Libner
2015
Albania road race championships, Redi Halilaj
2020
Latvia road race, Viesturs Lukševics
