= Scandinavian Open Road Race =

Race details
- Date: May
- Region: Vårgårda Municipality
- Discipline: Road
- Competition: UCI Europe Tour
- Type: Single-day
- Organiser: Vårgårda Cykelklubb

History
- First edition: 1986
- Editions: 17
- Final edition: 2009
- First winner: Rolf Sørensen (DEN)
- Most wins: No repeat winners
- Final winner: Patrick Stenberg (SWE)

The Scandinavian Open Road Race was a single-day road cycling race held in Vårgårda Municipality, Sweden from 1986 to 2009. It was part of UCI Europe Tour as a category 1.2 event from 2005 to 2009.

== Winners ==
| Year | Winner | Second | Third |
|---|---|---|---|
| 1986 | (Denmark) Rolf Sørensen | (Finland) Kari Myyryläinen | |
| 1987 | (Denmark) Kim Andersen | | |
| 1988 | (Denmark) Søren Lilholt | | |
| 1989 | (Denmark) Johnny Weltz | | |
| 1990-96 | No race | | |
| 1997 | (Denmark) Frank Høj | | |
| 1998 | (Norway) Vegard Øverås Lied | (Sweden) Mattias Carlsson | (Sweden) Jan Karlsson |
| 1999 | (Denmark) Martin Kryger | (Denmark) Jacob Moe Rasmussen | (Denmark) Danny Jonasson |
| 2000 | (Sweden) Magnus Ljungblad | (Denmark) Allan Bo Andresen | (Sweden) Michel Lafis |
| 2001 | (Sweden) Petter Renäng | (Netherlands) Julien Smink | (Sweden) Jonas Ljungblad |
| 2002 | (Sweden) Jonas Holmkvist | (Sweden) Tobias Lergard | (Sweden) Gustav Larsson |
| 2003 | (Sweden) John Nilsson | (Belgium) James Vanlandschoot | (Sweden) Thomas Lövkvist |
| 2004 | (Sweden) Marcus Ljungqvist | (Sweden) Fredrik Modin | (Sweden) Jonas Ljungblad |
| 2005 | (Sweden) Christofer Stevensson | (Netherlands) Arnoud van Groen | (Sweden) Jonas Ljungblad |
| 2006 | (Norway) Edvald Boasson Hagen | (Belarus) Vasil Kiryienka | (Denmark) Jens-Erik Madsen |
| 2007 | (Sweden) Lucas Persson | (Netherlands) Adriaan Helmantel | (Estonia) Mart Ojavee |
| 2008 | (Latvia) Aleksejs Saramotins | (Netherlands) Ruud Fransen | (Netherlands) Marco Brus |
| 2009 | (Sweden) Patrik Stenberg | (Sweden) Patrik Moren | (Sweden) Sebastian Balck |
