= Andres Lauk =

Estonian cyclist

Personal information
- Born: 16 October 1964 (age 62) Lümanda, then part of Estonian SSR, Soviet Union

Cycling career
- Sport: Cycling

Andres Lauk (born 16 October 1964) is an Estonian cyclist. He competed in the men's individual road race at the 1996 Summer Olympics.
