= Kalev Chocolate Team =

Estonian cycling team

Team information
- UCI code: KCT
- Registered: Estonia
- Founded: 2004
- Disbanded: 2010
- Discipline: Road
- Status: UCI Continental

Key personnel
- General manager: Jüri Savitski

Team name history
- 2004 2005 2006–2007 2008 2009 2010: Kalev Chocolate Team–Merida; Kalev Chocolate–Classic Bicycles; Kalev Chocolate Team; Kalev Sport; Meridiana–Kalev Chocolate; Kalev Chocolate–Kuota

Kalev Chocolate Team was an Estonian UCI Continental cycling team that existed from 2004 to 2010.

== Major wins ==
2006
Tallinn–Tartu GP, Janek Tombak
2009
Latvian National Road Race Championships, Oļegs Meļehs
