= Tallinn–Tartu GP =

International cycling race competition held in Estonia

Coordinates: 59.395212°N 24.6734905°E

Tallinn-Tartu GP
Race details
- Date: Early June
- Region: Tallinn, Estonia
- Discipline: Road race
- Competition: UCI Europe Tour
- Type: Single-day
- Web site: www.proklubi.ee

History
- First edition: 2002
- Editions: 11
- Final edition: 2012
- First winner: Oleg Grishkin (RUS)
- Most wins: Janek Tombak (EST) (2 wins)
- Final winner: Saïd Haddou (FRA)

Tallinn–Tartu GP (before 2007, the E.O.S. Tallinn GP) was a single-day road bicycle race held annually in June in Tallinn, Estonia. From 2005 until 2012 the race was organized as a 1.1 event on the UCI Europe Tour. In 2008, Pro Cycling Club gave up organizing the E.O.S. Tallinn GP and race name was changed to Tallinn–Tartu GP, organized by Club Tartu Maraton. The race was discontinued in 2012, with the same course becoming the first stage of the Tour of Estonia instead.

== Winners ==
Year	Country	Rider	Team
2002	Russia	Oleg Grishkin	Moscow Team
2003	France	Arnaud Coyot	Cofidis
2004	Ireland	Mark Scanlon	AG2R Prévoyance
2005	Estonia	Janek Tombak	Nesebar
2006	Estonia	Janek Tombak	Kalev Chocolate Team
2007	Estonia	Erki Pütsep	Estonia (national team 1)
2008	Estonia	Mart Ojavee	Rietumu Banka–Riga
2009	Estonia	Erki Pütsep	Cycling Club Bourgas
2010	France	Denis Flahaut	ISD Continental Team
2011	Italy	Angelo Furlan	Christina Watches–Onfone
2012	France	Saïd Haddou	Team Europcar
