= Tartu GP =

Road cycling race

Race details
- Date: Early June
- Region: Tartu, Estonia
- Discipline: Road race
- Competition: UCI Europe Tour
- Type: Single-day
- Organiser: Club Tartu Maraton

History
- First edition: 2001
- Editions: 12
- Final edition: 2012
- First winner: Jaan Kirsipuu (EST)
- Most wins: Jaan Kirsipuu (EST) (3 wins)
- Final winner: Rene Mandri (EST)

The Tartu GP was a one-day road cycling race in Tartu, Estonia. It was first run in 2001 and became part of the UCI Europe Tour as a 1.1 event in 2005. The most successful rider was Jaan Kirsipuu with three consecutive victories. The race was discontinued in 2012 and has instead been run as the final stage of the Tour of Estonia since that race's inception in 2013.

== Past winners ==
Year	Country	Rider	Team
2001	Estonia	Jaan Kirsipuu	AG2R Prévoyance
2002	Estonia	Jaan Kirsipuu	AG2R Prévoyance
2003	Estonia	Jaan Kirsipuu	AG2R Prévoyance
2004	Ireland	Mark Scanlon	AG2R Prévoyance
2005	Lithuania	Tomas Vaitkus	AG2R Prévoyance
2006	Poland	Wojciech Pawłak	Knauf Team
2007	Estonia	Erki Pütsep	Bouygues Télécom
2008	Latvia	Aleksejs Saramotins	Rietumu Bank-Riga
2009	Germany	Hannes Blank	Continental Team Differdange
2010	Estonia	Tanel Kangert	Estonia (national team)
2011	France	Jean-Eudes Demaret	Cofidis
2012	Estonia	Rene Mandri	Endura Racing
