= Tour du Lac Léman =

Race details
- Region: Geneva, Switzerland
- Discipline: Road
- Type: One-day race

History
- First edition: 1879
- Editions: 79
- Final edition: 2005
- First winner: Ernest Metral (SUI)
- Most wins: Heiri Suter (SUI) (4 wins)
- Final winner: Jonas Ljungblad (SWE)

The Tour du Lac Léman was a professional one-day road cycling race held annually around Lake Geneva, Switzerland. The race has not been held since 2005.

== Winners ==
Year	Winner	Second	Third
1879	(Switzerland) Ernest Metral	(Switzerland) James Grandjean	(Switzerland) Téodore Mottaz
1880	(Switzerland) James Grandjean	?	?
1881	(Switzerland) Téodore Mottaz	?	?
1882	No race		
1883	(Switzerland) Paul Bruel	(Switzerland) Justin Carrel	(Switzerland) Téodore Mottaz
1884	(Switzerland) Paul Bruel	(Switzerland) Eugène Parent	(Switzerland) Julien Maurer
1885	(Switzerland) Jean Müller	(Switzerland) Justin Carrel	(Switzerland) Téodore Mottaz
1886	(Switzerland) Charles Parent	(Switzerland) Paul Bruel	(Switzerland) Jean Müller
1887	(Switzerland) Louis Masi	(Switzerland) Paul Bruel	(Switzerland) Julien Maurer
1888– 1890	No race		
1891	(Switzerland) Louis Masi	(France) Lucien Lesna	(Switzerland) Edgard De Beaumont
1892	(Switzerland) Louis Masi	(Switzerland) Francis Piguet	(Switzerland) Arthur Crombach
1893	(Switzerland) Arnold Bozino	(Switzerland) Francis Piguet	(Switzerland) Georges Roesch
1894	(Switzerland) Georges Roesch	?	(Switzerland) Charles Etter
1895	(Switzerland) Jacques Goncet	(Switzerland) Georges Roesch	(Switzerland) Peclet
1896	(Switzerland) Jacques Goncet	(Switzerland) Emile Barrot	(Switzerland) Edouard Strobino
1897	(Switzerland) Arnold Bozino	(Switzerland) Charles Calame	(Switzerland) Bron
1898	(Switzerland) Charles Calame	(Switzerland) Louis Rossy	
1899	(Switzerland) Henri Pérollaz	(Switzerland) Charles Calame	(Switzerland) Louis Rossy
1900	(Switzerland) August Marforio	(Switzerland) Louis Rossy	?
1901	(Switzerland) Louis Rossy	(Switzerland) Albert Bosshard	(Switzerland) Dufour
1902	(Switzerland) August Marforio	(Switzerland) Jean-Pierre Montmège	(Switzerland) Joseph Cerutti
1903	(Switzerland) Ernst Meurer	(Switzerland) Jean-Pierre Montmège	(Switzerland) Albert Bosshard
1904	(Switzerland) Henri Pérollaz	(Switzerland) Albert Bosshard	(Switzerland) Alexandre Castellino
1905	(Switzerland) Henri Rheinwald	(Switzerland) Josef Mora	(Switzerland) Henri Pérollaz
1906	(Switzerland) Marcel Lequatre	(Switzerland) Josef Mora	?
1907	(Switzerland) Henri Rheinwald	(Italy) Riccardo Maffeo	?
1908	(Switzerland) Heinrich Gaugler	(Switzerland) Henri Rheinwald	(Switzerland) Marcel Lequatre
1909	(Switzerland) Marcel Lequatre	(Switzerland) Heinrich Gaugler	(Switzerland) François Leclerc
1910	(Switzerland) Marcel Perriere	(Switzerland) Charles Guyot	(Italy) Riccardo Maffeo
1911	(Switzerland) Marcel Perriere	(Switzerland) Marius Budry	(Switzerland) Marcel Lequatre
1912	(Switzerland) Henri Rheinwald	(Switzerland) Marcel Perriere	(Italy) Riccardo Maffeo
1913	(Switzerland) Otto Wiedmer	(Switzerland) Charles Guyot	(Switzerland) Marcel Perriere
1914− 1919	No race		
1920	(Switzerland) Henri Rheinwald	(Switzerland) Otto Wiedmer	(Italy) François Francescon
1921	(Italy) Franco Giorgetti	(Switzerland) Heiri Suter	(Italy) Ricardo Maffeo
1922	(Italy) Costante Girardengo	(Italy) Gaetano Belloni	(Switzerland) Heiri Suter
1923	(Italy) Pietro Bestetti	(Switzerland) Heiri Suter	(Switzerland) Henri Guillod
1924	(Switzerland) Heiri Suter	(Switzerland) Henri Reymond	(Switzerland) Kastor Notter
1925	(Switzerland) Marcel Perriere	(Switzerland) Gustav Lauppi	(Switzerland) Charles Perriere
1926	(Switzerland) Alfredo Saccomani	(Switzerland) Albert Blattmann	(Switzerland) Henri Guillod
1927	(Switzerland) Heiri Suter	(Switzerland) Kastor Notter	(Switzerland) Georg Antenen
1928	(Switzerland) Georg Antenen	(Switzerland) Albert Blattmann	(Switzerland) Ernst Meier
1929	(Switzerland) Heiri Suter	(Switzerland) Ernest Ambro	(Switzerland) Alfredo Saccomani
1930	(Switzerland) Heiri Suter	(Switzerland) Albert Blattmann	(Switzerland) Alfredo Saccomani
1931	(Austria) Max Bulla	(Switzerland) Ernst Meier	(Switzerland) Albert Buchi
1932	(Switzerland) Georg Antenen	(Germany) Karl Altenburger	(Switzerland) Henri Wullschleger
1933	(Switzerland) Albert Buchi	(Germany) Karl Altenburger	(Germany) Alfred Siegel
1934	(Switzerland) Walter Blattmann	(Switzerland) Alfred Bula	(Switzerland) Roger Pipoz
1935	(Germany) Karl Altenburger	(Switzerland) Roger Strebel	(Switzerland) Edgar Hehlen
1936	(Switzerland) Ernst Bühler	(Switzerland) Alfred Bula	(Switzerland) Hans Martin
1937	(Switzerland) Werner Buchwalder	(Switzerland) Edgar Buchwalder	(Switzerland) Max Bolliger
1938	(Luxembourg) François Neuens	(Switzerland) Hans Martin	(Switzerland) Kurt Stettler
1939	(Switzerland) Robert Lang	(Switzerland) Leo Amberg	(Switzerland) Karl Wyss
1940– 1941	No race		
1942	(Switzerland) André Hardegger	(Switzerland) Edgar Buchwalder	(Switzerland) Hans Martin
1943	(Switzerland) Hans Knecht	(Switzerland) Josef Wagner	(Switzerland) Fritz Saladin
1944	No race		
1945	(Switzerland) Hans Maag	(Switzerland) Hans Martin	(Switzerland) Gottfried Weilenmann
1946	(Switzerland) Robert Lang	(Switzerland) Ernest Näf	(Switzerland) Karl Litschi
1947	(Switzerland) Emilio Croci Torti	(France) Eloi Tassin	(United States) Joseph Magnani
1948	(France) Dominique Torelli	(Switzerland) Hans Lanz	(Switzerland) Gottfried Weilenmann
1949	(Switzerland) Fritz Schär	(Switzerland) Ernst Stettler	(Switzerland) Fritz Zbinden
1950	(Switzerland) Fritz Zbinden	(Italy) Pasquale Fornara	(Switzerland) René Cador
1951	(Switzerland) Armin Von Bueren	(West Germany) Heinz Müller	(Switzerland) Charles Guyot
1952	(Switzerland) Ferdi Kübler	(Italy) Gino Bartali	(Italy) Giovanni Corrieri
1953	(Switzerland) Armin Von Bueren	(Switzerland) Eugen Kamber	(Switzerland) Walter Diggelmann
1954	(Switzerland) Remo Pianezzi	(Switzerland) Max Schellenberg	(Switzerland) Fritz Zbinden
1955	(Switzerland) Alcide Vaucher	(Switzerland) Hans Hobin	(Switzerland) Remo Pianezzi
1956– 1970	No race		
1971	(Switzerland) Norbert Krapf	(Switzerland) Roberto Puttini	(Switzerland) Otto Bruhin
1972	(Switzerland) John Hugentobler	(Switzerland) René Leuenberger	(Switzerland) Bruno Hubschmid
1973	(Italy) Fausto Stiz	(Switzerland) Robert Thalmann	(Switzerland) Werner Fretz
1974	(Switzerland) Iwan Schmid	(Switzerland) Roland Salm	(Switzerland) Louis Pfenninger
1975	(Switzerland) René Leuenberger	(Switzerland) Hans Joerg Aemisegger	(France) René Grelin
1976	No race		
1977	(Switzerland) Bruno Wolfer	(Switzerland) Daniel Gisiger	(Switzerland) Antonio Ferretti
1978– 1995	No race		
1996	(Italy) Stefano Faustini	(Italy) Biagio Conte	(Switzerland) Laurent Dufaux
1997	(United Kingdom) Chris Newton	(Switzerland) Daniel Schnider	(Switzerland) Alexander Äschbach
1998	(Sweden) Glenn Magnusson	(Switzerland) Markus Zberg	(Italy) Gino Paolini
1999	(Switzerland) Bruno Boscardin	(France) Frédéric Bessy	(France) Sébastien Laroche
2000	(Latvia) Andris Naudužs	(Belarus) Alexandre Usov	(Switzerland) Martin Bolt
2001	(Switzerland) Steve Zampieri	(Switzerland) Stefan Rütimann	(Switzerland) Roger Beuchat
2002	(Italy) Filippo Pozzato	(Ukraine) Mikhaylo Khalilov	(Italy) Luigi Giambelli
2003	No race		
2004	(Russia) Dimitri Konyshev	(Italy) Mauro Santambrogio	(Russia) Dmitri Gainetdinov
2005	(Sweden) Jonas Ljungblad	(Estonia) Rene Mandri	(France) Remi Pauriol
