= Giro del Lago Maggiore =

Race details
- Date: March
- Region: Switzerland
- English name: Tour of Lake Maggiore
- Discipline: Road
- Competition: UCI Europe Tour
- Type: One-day race

History
- First edition: 1982 (men); 1985 (women)
- Editions: 25
- Final edition: 2006 (men); 2009 (women)
- First winner: Alain Dällenbach (SWI); Barbara Ganz (SWI)
- Final winner: Giairo Ermeti (ITA); Noemi Cantele (ITA)

The Giro del Lago Maggiore, also known as GP Knorr, was a one-day road cycling race held annually near Lake Maggiore in Switzerland. The last two editions of the men's race were part of the UCI Europe Tour in category 1.2.

== Winners ==
=== Men ===
| Year | Winner | Second | Third |
|---|---|---|---|
| 1982 | (Switzerland) Alain Dällenbach | (Italy) Marco Vitali | (Switzerland) André Gsell |
| 1983 | (Switzerland) Peter Wollenmann | (Switzerland) André Massard | (Switzerland) Killian Blum |
| 1984 | (Switzerland) Jörg Müller | (Switzerland) Bernard Voillat | (Switzerland) Jocelyn Jolidon |
| 1985 | (Switzerland) Guido Winterberg | (Switzerland) Stephan Joho | (Switzerland) Arno Küttel |
| 1986 | (Switzerland) Kurt Steinmann | (Switzerland) Daniel Huwyler | (West Germany) Peter Becker |
| 1987 | (Switzerland) Daniel Gisiger | (Italy) Walter Delle Case | (Czechoslovakia) Jan Koba |
| 1988 | (Switzerland) Richard Trinkler | (Switzerland) Pius Schwarzentruber | (Switzerland) Jocelyn Jolidon |
| 1989 | (Switzerland) Heinz Imboden | (Switzerland) Gilbert Glaus | (Switzerland) Rolf Rutschmann |
| 1990 | (Switzerland) Andrea Guidotti | (Switzerland) Gilbert Glaus | (Switzerland) Rolf Rutschmann |
| 1991 | (Switzerland) Bruno Risi | (Switzerland) Kurt Betschart | (Switzerland) Thomas Wegmüller |
| 1992 | (Switzerland) Thomas Wegmüller | (Switzerland) Kurt Betschart | (Switzerland) Daniel Wyder |
| 1993 | (Poland) Zbigniew Piątek | (Poland) Andrzej Sypytkowski | (Switzerland) Mauro Gianetti |
| 1994 | (Italy) Gianvito Martinelli | (Italy) Fabrizio Bontempi | (Switzerland) Bruno Boscardin |
| 1995 | (Switzerland) Karl Kalin | (Italy) Francesco Secchiari | (Switzerland) Urs Graf |
| 1996 | (Switzerland) Armin Meier | (Italy) Gianpaolo Mondini | (Italy) Davide Casarotto |
| 1997 | (Italy) Endrio Leoni | (Italy) Gabriele Balducci | (Italy) Nicola Minali |
| 1998 | (Italy) Luca Mazzanti | (Italy) Gilberto Simoni | (Italy) Marco Milesi |
| 1999 | (Italy) Gabriele Balducci | (Latvia) Romāns Vainšteins | (Italy) Alessandro Petacchi |
| 2000 | (Germany) Tobias Steinhauser | (Italy) Stefano Zanini | (Poland) Artur Krzeszowiec |
| 2001 | (Italy) Paolo Bossoni | (Belarus) Yauheni Seniushkin | (Italy) Alessandro Pozzi |
| 2002 | (Italy) Filippo Pozzato | (Poland) Piotr Przydział | (Slovenia) Boštjan Mervar |
| 2003 | (Italy) Raffaele Illiano | (Germany) Markus Knopfle | (Finland) Kjell Carlström |
| 2004 | (Spain) Aitor Galdós | (Ukraine) Mikhaylo Khalilov | (Switzerland) Sascha Urweider |
| 2005 | (Italy) Mauro Santambrogio | (Italy) Michele Maccanti | (Italy) Danilo Napolitano |
| 2006 | (Italy) Giairo Ermeti | (Sweden) Fredrik Kessiakoff | (Switzerland) Roger Beuchat |

=== Women ===
| Year | Winner | Second | Third |
|---|---|---|---|
| 1985 | (Switzerland) Barbara Ganz | | |
| 1986 | (Italy) Roberta Bonanomi | | |
| 1987 | (Italy) Imelda Chiappa | (Switzerland) Luzia Zberg | (France) Dominique Damiani |
| 1988 | (Switzerland) Edith Schönberger | (Switzerland) Barbara Ganz | (Switzerland) Isabelle Michel |
| 1989 | (Switzerland) Barbara Ganz | (Switzerland) Evelyne Müller | (Switzerland) Edith Schönberger |
| 1990 | (Switzerland) Eva Gallmann | | |
| 1991 | (Switzerland) Luzia Zberg | (Switzerland) Evelyne Müller | (Liechtenstein) Yvonne Elkuch |
| 1992 | (Switzerland) Hanni Weiss | (Switzerland) Susanne Krauer | (Switzerland) Evelyne Müller |
| 1993 | (Switzerland) Yvonne Schnorf | (Switzerland) Luzia Zberg | (Germany) Karin Romer |
| 1994 | (Switzerland) Luzia Zberg | (Switzerland) Yvonne Schnorf | (Switzerland) Nicole Ebner |
| 1997 | (Switzerland) Andrea Hänny | (Switzerland) Marcia Eicher | (Switzerland) Jolanda Schleuniger |
| 1998 | (Switzerland) Chantal Daucourt | (Ukraine) Natalja Yuganiuk | (Switzerland) Lucille Hunkeler |
| 1999 | (Ukraine) Natalja Yuganiuk | (Switzerland) Chantal Daucourt | (Switzerland) Marika Murer |
| 2000 | (Italy) Greta Zocca | (Germany) Regina Schleicher | (Switzerland) Nicole Brändli |
| 2001 | (Switzerland) Marika Murer | (Ukraine) Natalja Yuganiuk | (Italy) Barbara Cazzaniga |
| 2002 | (Italy) Vera Carrara | (Belarus) Volha Hayeva | (Switzerland) Alexandra Vetter |
| 2003 | (Australia) Alison Wright | (Italy) Noemi Cantele | (Australia) Hayley Brown |
| 2004 | (Italy) Vera Carrara | (France) Caroline Payot-Podevin | (Switzerland) Bettina Kühn |
| 2005 | (Italy) Giorgia Bronzini | (Brazil) Janildes Fernandes Silva | (Switzerland) Bettina Kühn |
| 2006 | (Italy) Fabiana Luperini | (Lithuania) Diana Žiliūtė | (Switzerland) Nicole Brändli |
| 2007 | (Italy) Noemi Cantele | (France) Magali Mocquery | (Italy) Fabiana Luperini |
| 2008 | (Switzerland) Nicole Brändli | (Italy) Noemi Cantele | (Italy) Marta Bastianelli |
| 2009 | (Italy) Noemi Cantele | (France) Jeannie Longo | (Germany) Eva Lutz |
