= Giro del Mendrisiotto =

Cycling competition

Race details
- Date: Mid-March
- Region: Ticino, Switzerland
- English name: Tour of Mendrisiotto
- Discipline: Road
- Competition: UCI Europe Tour
- Type: Single day race

History
- First edition: 1933
- Editions: 72 (as of 2012)
- First winner: Enrico Gerosa (SUI)
- Most wins: Gilbert Glaus (SUI) (3 wins)
- Most recent: Marcel Aregger (SUI)

Giro del Mendrisiotto is a road bicycle race held annually around Mendrisio, in the canton of Ticino of Switzerland. The race was an amateur competition until 1996. Since 2005, it is organized as a 1.2 event on the UCI Europe Tour. In 2010 the race was excluded from the UCI calendar, once again becoming a national event.

== Winners ==
Year	Country	Rider	Team
1933	Switzerland	Enrico Gerosa	
1934	Switzerland	Fausto Introzzi	
1935	Switzerland	Ettore Maestrani	
1936	Switzerland	Fermo Radaelli	
1937	Switzerland	Fermo Radaelli	
1938	Switzerland	Walter Diggelmann	
1939	Germany	Ernesto Kuhn	
1940– 1946	No race		
1947	Switzerland	Franco Fanri	
1948	No race		
1949	Switzerland	Remo Pianezzi	
1950	Switzerland	Hans Pfenninger	
1951	Italy	Rino Benedetti	
1952	Switzerland	Fausto Lurati	
1953	Switzerland	Attilio Moresi	
1954	Switzerland	Vittorio Mazzuchelli	
1955	Switzerland	Armando Ceroni	
1956	Switzerland	Adriano De Gasperi	
1957	Switzerland	Alfred Ruegg	
1958	Switzerland	Giancarlo Poiano	
1959	Italy	Arturo Sabbadin	
1960	Switzerland	Rolf Maurer	
1961	France	Jean Jourden	
1962	Switzerland	Robert Hintermüller	
1963	Switzerland	Gilbert Fatton	
1964	Switzerland	Hans Luethi	
1965	Switzerland	Hans Luethi	
1966	Italy	Vladimiro Palazzi	
1967	Switzerland	Walter Richard	
1968	Switzerland	Arthur Schlatter	
1969	Switzerland	Franco Maietti	
1970	Switzerland	Germano Mignami	
1971	Switzerland	Josef Fuchs	
1972	Switzerland	Xavier Kurmann	
1973	Switzerland	Robert Thalmann	
1974	Switzerland	Ivan Schmid	
1975	Switzerland	Roland Schär	
1976	Switzerland	Gabriele Mirri	
1977	Switzerland	Gilbert Glaus	
1978	Switzerland	Stefan Mutter	
1979	Switzerland	Kurt Ehrensberger	
1980	Switzerland	Gilbert Glaus	
1981	Switzerland	Gilbert Glaus	
1982	Switzerland	Jürg Bruggmann	
1983	Switzerland	Richard Trinkler	
1984	Switzerland	Benno Wyss	
1985	Switzerland	Thomas Wegmüller	
1986	Australia	Stephen Hodge	
1987	Switzerland	Daniel Huwyler	
1988	Australia	Scott Sunderland	
1989	Australia	Barney St. George	
1990	Switzerland	Pascal Jaccard	
1991	Switzerland	Daniel Huwyler	
1992	Ukraine	Serhiy Utchakov	
1993	Denmark	Christian Andersen	
1994	Austria	Peter Luttenberger	
1995	Switzerland	Ralph Gartmann	
1996	Italy	Salvatore Commesso	
1997	Switzerland	Beat Zberg	Mercatone Uno
1998	Switzerland	Felice Puttini	Ros Mary–Amica Chips
1999	Italy	Valentino Fois	Vini Caldirola
2000	Switzerland	Felice Puttini	Alessio
2001	Switzerland	Alexandre Moos	Phonak
2002	Ukraine	Ruslan Gryshchenko	Zoccorinese Vellutex
2003	Poland	Mariusz Wiesiak	Pacific-Da-Ver
2004	Italy	Giuseppe De Maria	Vellutex Palazzago
2005	Italy	Michele Maccanti	LPR–Piacenza
2006	Italy	Daniele De Paoli	Team LPR
2007	Switzerland	Andreas Dietziker	Team LPR
2008	Italy	Eddy Serri	Miche–Silver Cross
2009	Lithuania	Ignatas Konovalovas	Cervélo TestTeam
2010	Switzerland	Andreas Dietziker	Vorarlberg–Corratec
2011	Switzerland	Mirco Saggiorato	Atlas Personal
2012	Switzerland	Marcel Aregger	Atlas Personal–Jakroo
