= Swiss National Road Race Championships =

National road cycling championship in Switzerland

The champion's jersey

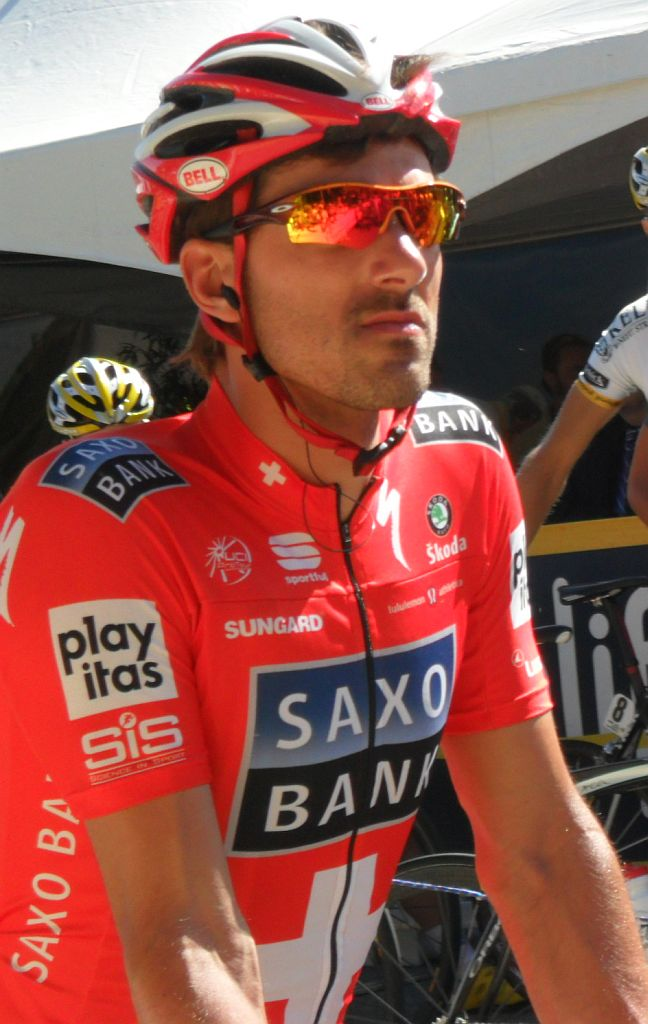
Fabian Cancellara

The Swiss National Road Race Championships are held annually. They are a cycling race which decides the Swiss cycling champion in the road racing discipline, across several categories of rider. The event was first held in 1892 and was won by Edouard Wicky. Ferdinand Kübler and Heiri Suter share the men's record with 5 victories. The current champions are Noemi Rüegg for women and Jan Christen for men.

== Multiple winners ==
=== Men ===
Name	Wins	Years
Ferdinand Kübler	5	1948, 1949, 1950, 1951, 1954
Heiri Suter	5	1920, 1921, 1922, 1926, 1929
Roland Salm	4	1974, 1975, 1976, 1977
Martin Elmiger	4	2001, 2005, 2010, 2014
Henri Rheinwald	3	1908, 1912, 1919
Marcel Perrière	3	1911, 1915, 1916
Kastor Notter	3	1924, 1925, 1927
Hans Knecht	3	1943, 1946, 1947
Rolf Graf	3	1956, 1959, 1962
Silvan Dillier	2	2017, 2021

== Men ==
=== Elite ===
Swiss National Road Race Championships – Men's elite race
Race details
- Region: Switzerland
- Discipline: Road bicycle racing
- Type: One-dayspor

History
- First edition: 1892
- First winner: Edouard Wicky
- Most wins: Ferdinand Kübler; Heiri Suter; (5 wins)
- Most recent: Mauro Schmid

Year	Gold	Silver	Bronze
1892	Edouard Wicky	Eugëne Wicky	Robert Crausaz
1893	Edouard Wicky	Théodore Champion	Arnold Bozino
1894	Henri Favre	Serge Sarzano	Gaston Beguin
1895	Henri Favre	Jacques Gonzet	Arnold Bozino
1896	Jean Viarret	Henri Favre	Ernst Käser
1897	Jean Viarret	Charles Calame	Jean Bron
1898	Albert Furrer	Emile Barrot	Georg Isler
1899	Fritz Ryser	Charles Calame	Georg Isler
1900	Charles Lugon	Ernst Dubach	Franz Jucker
1901	Not held		
1902	Ernst Dubach	Paul Locher	Albert Mamié
1903	Not held		
1904	Alexandre Castellino	Marcel Lequatre	Charles Piquet
1905– 1907	Not held		
1908	Henri Rheinwald	Heinrich Gaugler	Franz Suter
1909	Charles Guyot	Henri Rheinwald	Marcel Lequatre
1910	Charles Guyot	Robert Chopard	Erwin Kohler
1911 (French)	Marcel Perrière	Henri Rheinwald	Otto Wiedmer
1911 (German)	Robert Chopard	Emile Chopard	Konrad Werfeli
1912	Henri Rheinwald	Charles Guyot	Marcel Perrière
1913	Otto Wiedmer	Marcel Perrière	Henri Rheinwald
1914	Oscar Egg	Henri Rheinwald	Marcel Perrière
1915	Marcel Perrière	Charles Guyot	Paul Suter
1916	Marcel Perrière	Arnold Grandjean	Henri Rheinwald
1917	Ernst Kaufmann	Marcel Perrière	Marcel Lequatre
1918	Ernst Kaufmann	Heiri Suter	Heinrich Wegmann
1919	Henri Rheinwald	Marcel Lequatre	Walter Rochat
1920	Heiri Suter	Max Suter	Otto Wiedmer
1921	Heiri Suter	Charles Guyot	Marcel Perrière
1922	Heiri Suter	Henri Collé	Marius Demierre
1923	Henri Guillod	Heiri Suter	Kastor Notter
1924	Kastor Notter	Henri Reymond	Henri Collé
1925	Kastor Notter	Heiri Suter	Henri Reymond
1926	Heiri Suter	Albert Blattmann	Roger Pipoz
1927	Kastor Notter	Albert Blattmann	Henri Reymond
1928	Albert Blattmann	Georges Antenen	Eugen Schlegel
1929	Heiri Suter	Georges Antenen	Albert Meyer
1930 (Note: The original winner Heiri Suter was relegated due to an irregular sprint.)	Georges Antenen	Albert Blattmann	Gérard Wuilleumier
1931	Albert Büchi	Georges Antenen	Alfred Bula
1932	August Erne	Albert Büchi	Ernst Meier
1933	Georges Antenen	Roger Pipoz	Théo Heimann
1934	Hans Gilgen	Kurt Stettler	Walter Blattmann
1935	Paul Egli	August Erne	Fritz Hartmann
1936	Paul Egli	Karl Litschi	Albert Büchi
1937	Leo Amberg	Robert Zimmermann	Werner Buchwalder
1938	Leo Amberg	Hans Martin	Werner Buchwalder
1939	Karl Litschi	Fritz Saladin	Hans Martin
1940	Edgar Buchwalder	Hans Martin	Werner Buchwalder
1941	Karl Litschi	Paul Egli	Walter Diggelmann
1942	Edgar Buchwalder	Hans Knecht	Leo Amberg
1943	Hans Knecht	Ernst Näf	Fritz Stocker
1944	Ernst Näf	Josef Wagner	Hans Maag
1945	Ernst Wüthrich	Josef Wagner	Leo Weilenmann
1946	Hans Knecht	Werner Buchwalder	Ernst Näf
1947	Hans Knecht	Karl Litschi	Pietro Tarchini
1948	Ferdinand Kübler	Georges Aeschlimann	Emilio Croci-Torti
1949	Ferdinand Kübler	Emilio Croci-Torti	Fritz Schär
1950	Ferdinand Kübler	Fritz Schär	Gottfried Weilenmann
1951	Ferdinand Kübler	Giovanni Rossi	Fritz Zbinden
1952	Gottfried Weilenmann Jr.	Carlo Lafranchi	Jean Brun
1953	Fritz Schär	Marcel Huber	Carlo Lafranchi
1954	Ferdinand Kübler	Fritz Schär	Carlo Clerici
1955	Hugo Koblet	Carlo Clerici	Hans Hollenstein
1956	Rolf Graf	Fritz Schär	Ernst Traxel
1957	Hans Hollenstein	Max Schellenberg	Toni Gräser
1958	Jean-Claude Grèt	Toni Gräser	Oskar Von Büren
1959	Rolf Graf	Attilio Moresi	Fritz Gallati
1960	René Strehler	Rolf Graf	Erwin Lutz
1961	Ernst Fuchs	Rolf Graf	Rolf Maurer
1962	Rolf Graf	Giovanni Albisetti	Attilio Moresi
1963	Attilio Moresi	Rolf Maurer	Rudolf Hauser
1964	Rudolf Hauser	Manfred Häberli	Robert Hintermüller
1965	Robert Hagmann	Werner Weber	Willy Spühler
1966	Paul Zollinger	Hans Stadelmann	Louis Pfenninger
1967	Alfred Rüegg	Willy Spühler	René Binggeli
1968	Karl Brand	Peter Abt	Emil Zimmermann
1969	Bernard Vifian	Louis Pfenninger	Erwin Thalmann
1970	Kurt Rub	Erwin Thalmann	Peter Abt
1971 (Note: The championship was based on 2 individual races.)	Louis Pfenninger	Jürg Schneider	Erwin Thalmann
1972 (Note: The championship was based on 3 individual races.)	Josef Fuchs	Louis Pfenninger	Erich Spahn
1973	Josef Fuchs	Louis Pfenninger	Bruno Hubschmid
1974 (Note: The race was held alongside the German National Road Race Championships and the Luxembourgish National Road Race Championships.)	Roland Salm	Louis Pfenninger	Ueli Sutter
1975	Roland Salm	Josef Fuchs	Ueli Sutter
1976	Roland Salm	Ueli Sutter	Roland Schär
1977	Roland Salm	René Savary	Guido Amrhein
1978	Gottfried Schmutz	Erwin Lienhard	Josef Fuchs
1979	Hansjörg Aemisegger	Bruno Wolfer	Guido Amrhein
1980	Gottfried Schmutz	Erwin Lienhard	Daniel Gisiger
1981	Stefan Mutter	Daniel Gisiger	Erwin Lienhard
1982	Gilbert Glaus	Bruno Wolfer	Daniel Müller
1983 (Note: The original winner, Gottfried Schmutz was disqualified for doping.)	Serge Demierre	Stefan Mutter	Bruno Wolfer
1984	Erich Maechler	Hubert Seiz	Gilbert Glaus
1985	Gottfried Schmutz	Urs Freuler	Heinz Imboden
1986	Urs Zimmermann	Jörg Müller	Jean-Marie Grezet
1987 (Note: The race was held alongside the German National Road Race Championships and the Liechtenstein National Road Race Championships.)	Jörg Müller	Pascal Richard	Daniel Gisiger
1988	Hubert Seiz	Guido Winterberg	Fabian Fuchs
1989	Pascal Richard	Niki Rüttimann	Herbert Niederberger
1990	Rolf Järmann	Hansruedi Märki	Tony Rominger
1991	Laurent Dufaux	Daniel Steiger	Mauro Gianetti
1992	Thomas Wegmüller	Erich Maechler	Beat Zberg
1993	Pascal Richard	Rolf Järmann	Mauro Gianetti
1994	Felice Puttini	Karl Kälin	Rocco Cattaneo
1995	Felice Puttini	Pascal Richard	Rolf Järmann
1996	Armin Meier	Beat Zberg	Oscar Camenzind
1997	Oscar Camenzind	Roland Meier	Niki Aebersold
1998	Niki Aebersold	Armin Meier	Franz Hotz
1999	Armin Meier	Daniel Schnider	Mauro Gianetti
2000	Markus Zberg	Marcel Strauss	Roger Beuchat
2001	Martin Elmiger	Pierre Bourquenoud	Daniel Schnider
2002	Alexandre Moos	Roger Beuchat	Pierre Bourquenoud
2003	Daniel Schnider	Roger Beuchat	Niki Aebersold
2004	Grégory Rast	Sascha Urweider	Oscar Camenzind
2005	Martin Elmiger	Alexandre Moos	Marcel Strauss
2006	Grégory Rast	Marcel Strauss	Aurélien Clerc
2007	Beat Zberg	Fabian Cancellara	David Loosli
2008	Markus Zberg	Martin Elmiger	Mathias Frank
2009	Fabian Cancellara	Mathias Frank	Thomas Frei
2010	Martin Elmiger	Simon Zahner	Pirmin Lang
2011	Fabian Cancellara	Steve Morabito	Martin Kohler
2012	Martin Kohler	Michael Albasini	Fabian Cancellara
2013	Michael Schär	Martin Elmiger	Martin Kohler
2014	Martin Elmiger	Michael Albasini	Steve Morabito
2015	Danilo Wyss	Sébastien Reichenbach	Mathias Frank
2016	Jonathan Fumeaux	Pirmin Lang	Steve Morabito
2017	Silvan Dillier	Stefan Küng	Kilian Frankiny
2018	Steve Morabito	Patrick Schelling	Michael Schär
2019	Sébastien Reichenbach	Simon Pellaud	Mathias Frank
2020	Stefan Küng	Danilo Wyss	Simon Pellaud
2021	Silvan Dillier	Simon Pellaud	Johan Jacobs
2022	Robin Froidevaux	Sébastien Reichenbach	Colin Stüssi
2023	Marc Hirschi	Antoine Debons	Simon Pellaud
2024	Mauro Schmid	Simon Pellaud	Stefan Bissegger
2025	Mauro Schmid	Marc Hirschi	Valentin Darbellay
2026	Jan Christen	Valentin Darbellay	Melk Zumstein

=== U23 ===
Year	Gold	Silver	Bronze
1998	Cédric Fragniere	Steve Zampieri	Benoît Volery
1999	Benoît Volery	Stefan Rüttimann	Uwe Straumann
2000	Aurélien Clerc	Martin Elmiger	Grégory Rast
2001	Vincent Bader	David Rusch	Oliver Wirz
2002	Grégory Rast	Xavier Pache	Michael Albasini
2003	Laurent Arn	Andrea Ros	Andreas Dietziker
2004	Hubert Schwab	Daniel Gysling	Steve Bovay
2005	Loic Mühlemann	Remo Spirgi	Benjamin Baumgartner
2006	Maxime Beney	Mathias Frank	Silvère Ackermann
2007	Elias Schmäh	Matthieu Deschenaux	Peter Andres
2008	Laurent Beuret	Marcel Wyss	Elias Schmäh
2009	Silvan Dillier	Nicolas Luthi	Daniel Henggeler
2010	Michael Bär	Alexandre Mercier	Marcel Aregger
2011	Marcel Aregger	Silvan Dillier	Patrick Schelling
2012	Remo Schuler	Silvan Dillier	Jan Keller
2013	Simon Pellaud	Colin Stüssi	Stefan Küng
2014	Fabian Lienhard	Lukas Spengler	Lukas Müller
2015	Patrick Müller	Frank Pasche	Lukas Spengler
2016	Lukas Spengler	Nico Selenati	Timo Güller
2017	Patrick Müller	Marc Hirschi	Jan Rüttimann
2018	Lukas Rüegg	Robin Froidevaux	Marc Hirschi
2019	Mauro Schmid	Antoine Aebi	Damian Lüscher
2020	Yannis Voisard	Joab Schneiter	Antoine Aebi
2021	Valère Thiébaud	Félix Stehli	Fabio Christen
2022	Nils Brun	Arnaud Tendon	Félix Stehli

== Women ==
Swiss National Road Race Championships – Women's elite race
Race details
- Region: Switzerland
- Discipline: Road bicycle racing
- Type: One-day

History
- First edition: 1982
- First winner: Stefania Carmine
- Most wins: Edith Schönenberger (5 wins)
- Most recent: Noemi Rüegg

Year	Gold	Silver	Bronze
1982	Stefania Carmine	Jolanda Kalt	Evelyne Müller
1983	Evelyne Müller	Stefania Carmine	Jolanda Kalt
1984	Edith Schönenberger	Barbara Ganz	Jolanda Kalt
1985	Edith Schönenberger	Stefania Carmine	Barbara Ganz
1986	Edith Schönenberger	Barbara Ganz	Stefania Carmine
1987	Edith Schönenberger	Evelyne Müller	Nicole Hofer-Suter
1988	Isabelle Michel	Edith Schönenberger	Barbara Ganz
1989	Edith Schönenberger	Luzia Zberg	Evelyne Müller
1990	Barbara Heeb	Sandra Krauer	Beatrice Horisberger
1991	Luzia Zberg	Barbara Ganz	Yvonne Schnorf
1992	Luzia Zberg	Barbara Ganz	Barbara Heeb
1993	Barbara Ganz	Luzia Zberg	Yvonne Schnorf
1994	Luzia Zberg	Beatrice Angele	Barbara Ganz
1995	Luzia Zberg	Barbara Heeb	Alexandra Bähler
1996	Maria Heim	Diana Rast	Marcia Eicher-Vouets
1997	Barbara Heeb	Marcia Eicher-Vouets	Diana Rast
1998	Barbara Heeb	Diana Rast	Diana Rast
1999	Priska Doppmann	Nicole Brändli	Yvonne Schnorf
2000	Diana Rast	Yvonne Schnorf	Priska Doppmann
2001	Nicole Brändli	Priska Doppmann	Marcia Eicher-Vouets
2002	Nicole Brändli	Priska Doppmann	Marcia Eicher-Vouets
2003	Nicole Brändli	Barbara Heeb	Diana Rast
2004	Sereina Trachsel	Nicole Hofer-Suter	Sarah Grab
2005	Sereina Trachsel	Nicole Brändli	Annette Beutler
2006	Annette Beutler	Nicole Brändli	Patricia Schwager
2007	Sereina Trachsel	Annette Beutler	Nicole Brändli
2008	Jennifer Hohl	Pascale Schnider	Emilie Aubry
2009	Jennifer Hohl	Bettina Kühn	Andrea Wölfer
2010	Emilie Aubry	Pascale Schnider	Doris Schweizer
2011	Pascale Schnider	Patricia Schwager	Jennifer Hohl
2012	Jennifer Hohl	Andrea Wölfer	Emilie Aubry
2013	Doris Schweizer	Sandra Weiss	Emilie Aubry
2014	Mirjam Gysling	Linda Indergand	Doris Schweizer
2015	Jolanda Neff	Marcia Eicher-Vouets	Doris Schweizer
2016	Doris Schweizer	Nicole Hanselmann	Jutta Stienen
2017	Nicole Hanselmann	Marlen Reusser	Jutta Stienen
2018	Jolanda Neff	Sina Frei	Nicole Hanselmann
2019	Marlen Reusser	Elise Chabbey	Jutta Stienen
2020	Elise Chabbey	Linda Indergand	Lara Krähemann
2021	Marlen Reusser	Elise Chabbey	Noemi Rüegg
2022	Caroline Baur	Noemi Rüegg	Sina Frei
2023	Marlen Reusser	Elena Hartmann	Elise Chabbey
2024	Noemi Rüegg	Linda Zanetti	Caroline Baur
2025	Steffi Häberlin	Elise Chabbey	Noemi Rüegg
