= SwissEver GP Cham-Hagendorn =

Swiss one-day road cycling race

Race details
- Date: May
- Region: Switzerland
- Discipline: Road
- Type: One-day
- Organiser: RMV Cham-Hagendorn
- Race director: Beat Schilter
- Web site: www.gpchamhagendorn.ch

History
- First edition: 1987
- Editions: 30 (as of 2021)
- First winner: Barbara Ganz (SUI)
- Most wins: Barbara Ganz (SUI) (2 wins)
- Most recent: Noemi Rüegg (SUI)

The SwissEver GP Cham-Hagendorn is a women's one-day road bicycle race held in Switzerland. Between 2015 and 2019, it was rated by the Union Cycliste Internationale (UCI) as a 1.2 race. In 2005 and 2012, the race was held as the Swiss National Road Race Championships.

== Past winners ==
Year	Country	Rider	Team
1987	Switzerland	Barbara Ganz	
1988	Switzerland	Barbara Ganz	
1989	Switzerland	Susanne Jolidon-Krauer	
1990– 1992	No race		
1993	Switzerland	Evelyne Müller	
1994	Ukraine	Nataliya Kyshchuk	
1995	New Zealand	Rebecca Bailey	
1996	Switzerland	Daniela Vogel	
1997	Ukraine	Natalja Yuganiuk	
1998	Switzerland	Sandra Wampfler	
1999	Switzerland	Yvonne Schnorf	
2000	No race		
2001	Switzerland	Priska Doppmann	
2002	Switzerland	Sarah Grab	
2003	Switzerland	Irene Hostettler	
2004	Australia	Bridget Evans	
2005	Switzerland	Sereina Trachsel	
2006	Australia	Helen Kelly	
2007	Great Britain	Nicole Cooke	Raleigh–Lifeforce–Creation HB Pro Cycling Team
2008	Switzerland	Andrea Thürig	
2009	Italy	Alessandra D'Ettorre	Gruppo Sportivo Top Girls–Fassa Bortolo–Raxy Line
2010	Lithuania	Kataržina Sosna	Vaiano Solaristech
2011	Switzerland	Andrea Wölfer	
2012	Switzerland	Jennifer Hohl	
2013	Switzerland	Nicole Hanselmann	Bigla Cycling Team
2014	Germany	Elke Gebhardt	Bigla Cycling Team
2015	Australia	Lizzie Williams	Orica–AIS
2016	Finland	Lotta Lepistö	Cervélo–Bigla Pro Cycling
2017	Australia	Sarah Roy	Orica–Scott
2018	Australia	Amanda Spratt	Mitchelton–Scott
2019	Denmark	Julie Leth	Bigla Pro Cycling
2020	No race due to the COVID-19 pandemic in Switzerland		
2021	Switzerland	Noemi Rüegg	Stade Rochelais Charente-Maritime
