= 2013 IAM Cycling season =

IAM Cycling
- 2013 season
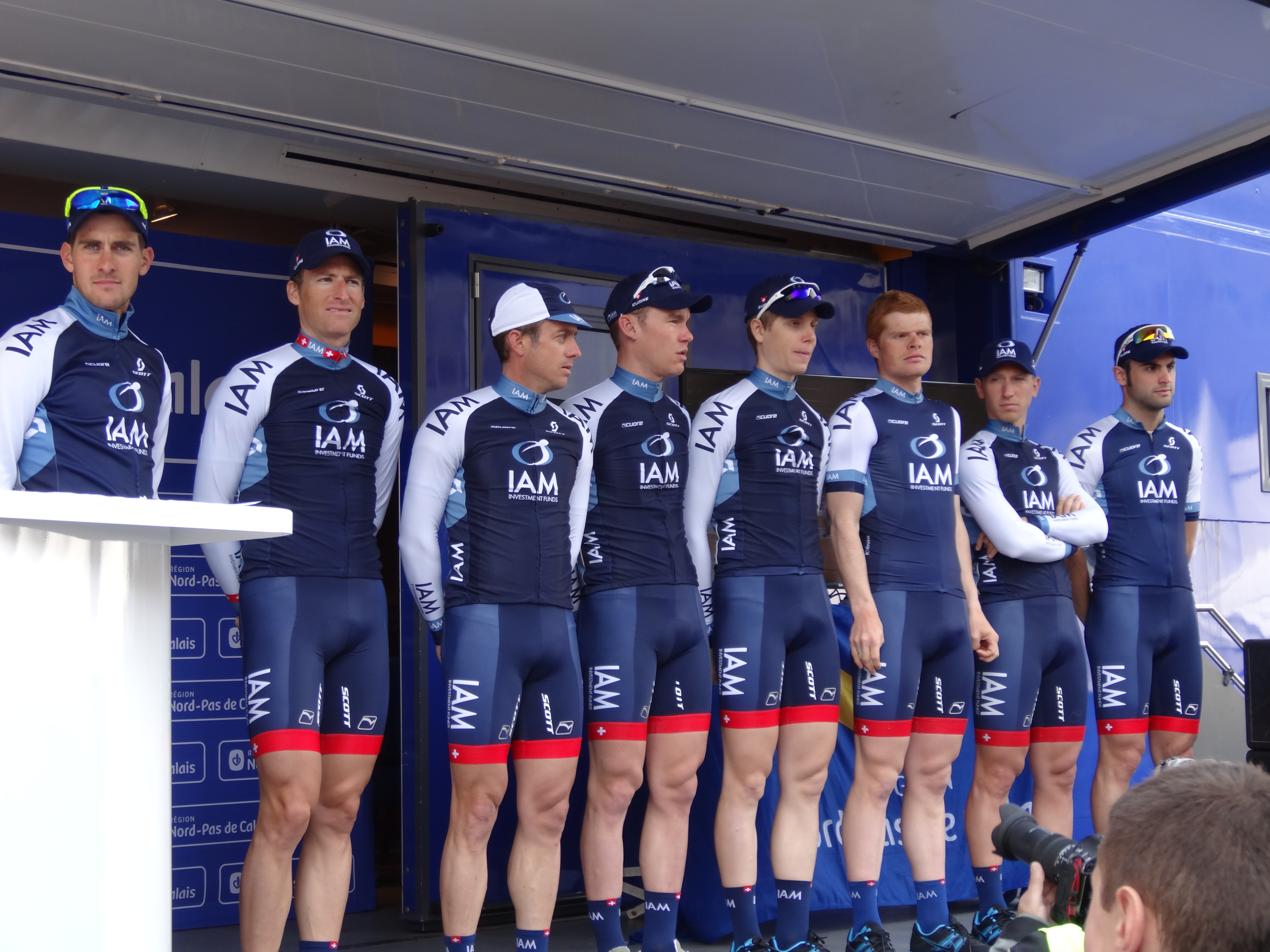
- The team at the 2013 Four Days of Dunkirk
- UCI code: IAM
- Status: UCI Professional Continental
- Europe Tour ranking: 2nd (1334.34 points)
- Owner: Michel Thétaz
- Manager: Serge Beucherie
- Main sponsor(s): IAM Independent Asset Management
- Based: Switzerland
- Bicycles: Scott
- Groupset: Shimano

Season victories
- One-day races: 4
- Stage race overall: 2
- Stage race stages: 3
- National Championships: 3
- Most wins: Martin Elmiger (2 wins)

The 2013 IAM Cycling season was the first season of the IAM Cycling team, which was founded in 2012. The team competed on the UCI Professional Continental level. They began the season on 27 January at the Grand Prix d'Ouverture La Marseillaise, and finished in October at the 2013 Giro di Lombardia. The team participated in UCI Continental Circuits and UCI World Tour events when given a wildcard invitation.

== New team ==
The paperwork for the foundation of the IAM Cycling SA company was filed in Geneva on 19 April 2012. The team was founded by Swiss businessman Michel Thiétaz and sponsored by his company IAM Independent Asset Management for three seasons. The team budget for their premiere season was 7 million euros. In August 2012 the team announced a high-profile signing, with 2010 Giro d'Italia stage winner and 2012 Tour of Utah winner Johann Tschopp of BMC Racing Team joining the team. Cofidis rider Mickaël Buffaz was rumoured to sign with the team, but did not receive a contract. IAM Cycling joined the Mouvement pour un cyclisme crédible in October 2012.

The team was officially launched 14 January 2013 in Geneva, with the goal for the season being invitations to Paris–Nice, Paris–Roubaix, the Critérium du Dauphiné and the Ardennes classics. The following week IAM Cycling was selected as a wild-card entry by race organisers Amaury Sport Organisation for the 2013 Paris–Nice race, but not for the 2013 Critérium du Dauphiné.

== Team roster ==
Ages as of January 1, 2013

Rider	Date of birth
Marcel Aregger (SUI)	August 26, 1990 (aged 22)
Marco Bandiera (ITA)	June 12, 1984 (aged 28)
Matthias Brändle (AUT)	December 7, 1989 (aged 23)
Rémi Cusin (FRA)	February 3, 1986 (aged 26)
Stefan Denifl (AUT)	September 22, 1987 (aged 25)
Martin Elmiger (SUI)	September 23, 1978 (aged 34)
Jonathan Fumeaux (SUI)	March 7, 1988 (aged 24)
Kristof Goddaert (BEL)	November 21, 1986 (aged 26)
Heinrich Haussler (AUS)	February 25, 1984 (aged 28)
Sébastien Hinault (FRA)	February 11, 1974 (aged 38)
Reto Hollenstein (SUI)	August 22, 1985 (aged 27)
Kevyn Ista (BEL)	November 22, 1984 (aged 28)

Rider	Date of birth
Dominic Klemme (GER)	October 31, 1986 (aged 26)
Pirmin Lang (SUI)	November 25, 1984 (aged 28)
Gustav Larsson (SWE)	September 20, 1980 (aged 32)
Thomas Löfkvist (SWE)	April 4, 1984 (aged 28)
Matteo Pelucchi (ITA)	January 21, 1989 (aged 23)
Alexandre Pliușchin (MDA)	January 13, 1987 (aged 25)
Sébastien Reichenbach (SUI)	May 28, 1989 (aged 23)
Aleksejs Saramotins (LAT)	April 8, 1982 (aged 30)
Patrick Schelling (SUI)	May 1, 1990 (aged 22)
Johann Tschopp (SUI)	July 1, 1982 (aged 30)
Marcel Wyss (SUI)	June 25, 1986 (aged 26)

=== Riders' 2012 teams ===
Rider	2012 team
Marcel Aregger	Atlas Personal–Jakroo
Marco Bandiera	Omega Pharma–Quick-Step
Matthias Brändle	Team NetApp
Rémi Cusin	Team Type 1–Sanofi
Stefan Denifl	Vacansoleil–DCM
Martin Elmiger	Ag2r–La Mondiale
Jonathan Fumeaux	Atlas Personal–Jakroo
Kristof Goddaert	Ag2r–La Mondiale
Heinrich Haussler	Garmin–Sharp
Sébastien Hinault	Ag2r–La Mondiale
Reto Hollenstein	Team NetApp
Kevyn Ista	Accent.jobs–Willems Veranda's

Rider	2012 team
Dominic Klemme	Argos–Shimano
Pirmin Lang	Atlas Personal–Jakroo
Gustav Larsson	Vacansoleil–DCM
Thomas Löfkvist	Team Sky
Matteo Pelucchi	Team Europcar
Alexandre Pliușchin	Leopard–Trek Continental Team
Sébastien Reichenbach	Maca-Loca-Scott
Aleksejs Saramotins	Cofidis
Patrick Schelling	Atlas Personal–Jakroo
Johann Tschopp	BMC Racing Team
Marcel Wyss	Team NetApp

== Staff ==
Former French champion and Crédit Agricole directeur sportif Serge Beucherie was hired as team manager. Former Swiss rider Marcello Albasini, former French rider Eddy Seigneur and former Finnish rider Kjell Carlström were hired as directeur sportifs along with former Swiss rider Rubens Bertogliati.

== One-day races ==
The team's first ever race was the Grand Prix d'Ouverture La Marseillaise on 27 January, where Wyss and Brändle both finished with the bunch. At the 1.2 race Tour de Berne IAM had five people in the top ten, with Marcel Wyss winning the race 13 seconds ahead of Sébastien Reichenbach and 15 seconds ahead of Rémi Cusin and Matthias Brändle. Reto Hollenstein finished sixth.

== Stage races ==
The 2013 Tour of Qatar was the teams' first ever stage race. Martin Elmiger finished second on the first stage, but lost his place in the general classification the next day. Heinrich Haussler finished fifth on stage three and ninth on stage five. The team did well at the Tour Méditerranéen in February, with Matteo Pelucchi finishing second on the first stage, letting him ride in the white jersey on stage two as the leader of the young rider classification. Thomas Löfkvist finished fourth on the second stage, and sixth on stage four which placed him in the green points jersey and only two seconds behind leader Maxime Monfort of RadioShack–Leopard. On the final stage Löfkvist lost the points jersey to Jürgen Roelandts of Lotto–Belisol but took over the lead and won the overall classification. Gustav Larsson finished eight and Stefan Denifl eleventh overall, and IAM won the teams classification ahead of Androni Giocattoli–Venezuela.

At the 2013 Tour of Oman Kristof Goddaert finished eight on the stage one bunch sprint, but was only 11th overall due to intermediate sprints. On stage two Goddaert finished in 63rd place and lost his position in the general classification. Martin Elmiger took part in a late breakaway which led to him finishing third, helping him into third place overall and seventh in the points classification. Marco Bandiera finished seventh, which placed him in ninth place overall. After stage two Jonathan Fumeaux was eighth in the young rider classification, and IAM was second in the team classification. Elmiger finished 16th on stage three, dropping to fourth overall while IAM fell to third place in the teams classification and Fumeaux climbed to sixth in the young rider classification. On stage four Johann Tschopp crossed the finish line in Jebel Akhdar in seventh place, which led to an eighth place in the overall standings and four points in the points classification. Fumeaux dropped one position in the young rider classification and IAM dropped to fourth place in the teams competition. On stage five Tschopp again finished seventh, elevating him into sixth position overall six seconds in front of Vincenzo Nibali (XDS Astana Team). Fumeaux finished 76th on the stage and dropped to ninth place in the youth classification. On the sixth and final stage Tschopp finished with the bunch, thus retaining his sixth place in the general classification. Elmiger was 15th overall. Fumeaux finished ninth overall in the young riders classification, over a minute behind eighth placed Jens Keukeleire of Orica–GreenEDGE, and IAM finished fourth in the teams classification only twelve second behind third placed FDJ. Elmiger and´Tschopp finished 17th and 20th respectively in the overall points classification, with Marco Bandiera and Goddaert also scoring some points.

== Grand Tours ==
As an UCI Professional Continental team IAM Cycling was not automatically granted the right to participate in any of the three Grand Tours. The team was considered by race organiser Amaury Sport Organisation for a Tour de France invitation, but ultimately was not invited. They did not receive an invitation to the Giro d'Italia or the Vuelta a España either, but were invited to Milan–San Remo and Il Lombardia by Giro race organizer RCS Sport instead.

== Season victories ==
Date	Race	Competition	Rank	Rider	Country	Location	Ref
10 February	Tour Méditerranéen, Overall	UCI Europe Tour	2.1	Thomas Löfkvist (SWE)	France		
10 February	Tour Méditerranéen, Teams classification	UCI Europe Tour	2.1	(Note: The riders on the squad were Thomas Löfkvist, Stefan Denifl, Kevyn Ista, Dominic Klemme, Gustav Larsson, Matteo Pelucchi, Matthias Brändle and Aleksejs Saramotins)	France		
10 March	Paris–Nice, Mountains classification	UCI World Tour	WT	Johann Tschopp (SUI)	France		
2 April	Circuit de la Sarthe, Stage 1	UCI Europe Tour	2.1	Matteo Pelucchi (ITA)	France		
5 April	Circuit de la Sarthe, Points classification	UCI Europe Tour	2.1	Matteo Pelucchi (ITA)	France		
28 April	Tour de Romandie, Sprints classification	UCI World Tour	WT	Matthias Brändle (AUT)	France		
4 May	Tour de Berne	UCI Europe Tour	1.2	Marcel Wyss (SUI)	Switzerland	Lyss	
26 May	Bayern-Rundfahrt, Stage 5	UCI Europe Tour	2.HC	Heinrich Haussler (AUS)	Germany	Nuremberg	
26 May	Bayern-Rundfahrt, Mountains classification	UCI Europe Tour	2.HC	Stefan Denifl (AUT)	Germany		
28 July	Trofeo Matteotti	UCI Europe Tour	1.1	Sébastien Reichenbach (SUI)	Italy		
13 August	Tour de l'Ain, Mountains classification	UCI Europe Tour	2.1	Matthias Brändle (AUT)	France		
20 August	Tour du Limousin, Stage 1	UCI Europe Tour	2.1	Martin Elmiger (SUI)	France		
23 August	Tour du Limousin, Overall	UCI Europe Tour	2.1	Martin Elmiger (SUI)	France		
14 September	Tour du Jura	UCI Europe Tour	1.2	Matthias Brändle (AUT)	Switzerland		
15 September	Tour du Doubs	UCI Europe Tour	1.1	Aleksejs Saramotins (LAT)	France		
22 September	Tour of Britain, Points classification	UCI Europe Tour	2.1	Martin Elmiger (SUI)	United Kingdom		

=== National championships ===
1st National Time Trial Championships, Matthias Brändle
1st National Time Trial Championships, Gustav Larsson
1st National Road Race Championships, Aleksejs Saramotins
