= Felice Puttini =

Swiss cyclist

Personal information
- Born: 18 September 1967 (age 59) Sorengo, Switzerland

Cycling career
- Sport: Cycling
- Discipline: Road
- Role: Rider, Sports director

Amateur team
- VC Locarno

Professional teams
- 1989–1991: Carrera Jeans–Vagabond
- 1992: ZG Mobili–Selle Italia
- 1993: Mecair–Ballan
- 1994: Brescialat–Ceramiche Refin
- 1995–1997: Refin
- 1998–1999: Ros Mary–Amica Chips
- 2000: Alessio
- 2001–2002: Ceresit–CCC–Mat

Managerial team
- 2005–2008: Bigla Pro Cycling Team

Felice Puttini (born 18 September 1967) is a Swiss former cyclist. He was the Swiss National Road Race champion in 1994 and 1995. He also competed in the road race at the 1988 Summer Olympics.

== Career achievements ==
=== Major results ===
1985
2nd National Junior Road Race Championships
1987
4th Overall GP Tell
1988
2nd Stausee Rundfahrt Klingnau
1991
5th Coppa Placci
1992
5th G.P. Camaiore
1993
3rd Overall Hofbrau Cup
6th Overall Tour de Suisse
1994
1st National Road Race Championships
1st Stage 6 Volta a Portugal
6th Züri-Metzgete
10th Overall Tour de Suisse
1995
1st National Road Race Championships
2nd Trofeo Melinda
3rd Grand Prix Pino Cerami
4th Tour de Berne
6th Giro dell'Emilia
6th Giro di Romagna
8th Coppa Bernocchi
8th Subida a Urkiola
10th Road race, UCI World Road Championships
10th Giro di Lombardia
1996
2nd Tour de Berne
3rd Giro del Mendrisiotto
3rd Grand Prix Pino Cerami
1997
3rd Giro dell'Emilia
4th Giro di Toscana
7th GP Industria & Artigianato di Larciano
8th Gran Premio Bruno Beghelli
1998
1st Giro del Mendrisiotto
1st Gran Premio Industria e Commercio di Prato
3rd Giro di Lombardia
8th Milano–Torino
1999
3rd Overall Volta ao Distrito de Santarém
6th Giro del Veneto
10th Coppa Placci
2000
1st Giro del Mendrisiotto
9th Giro del Veneto
4th Route Adélie
2001
6th Tour du Lac Léman
8th Tour de Berne
10th Coppa Agostoni

=== Grand Tour general classification results timeline ===
Grand Tour	1989	1990	1991	1992	1993	1994	1995	1996	1997	1998	1999
Giro d'Italia	—	—	—	54	—	62	50	DNF	27	39	24
Tour de France	—	—	—	—	—	—	—	—	—	—	—
Vuelta a España	79	—	123	—	—	—	—	—	—	—	—

Legend
—	Did not compete
DNF	Did not finish
