= Michael Bär =

Swiss road cyclist

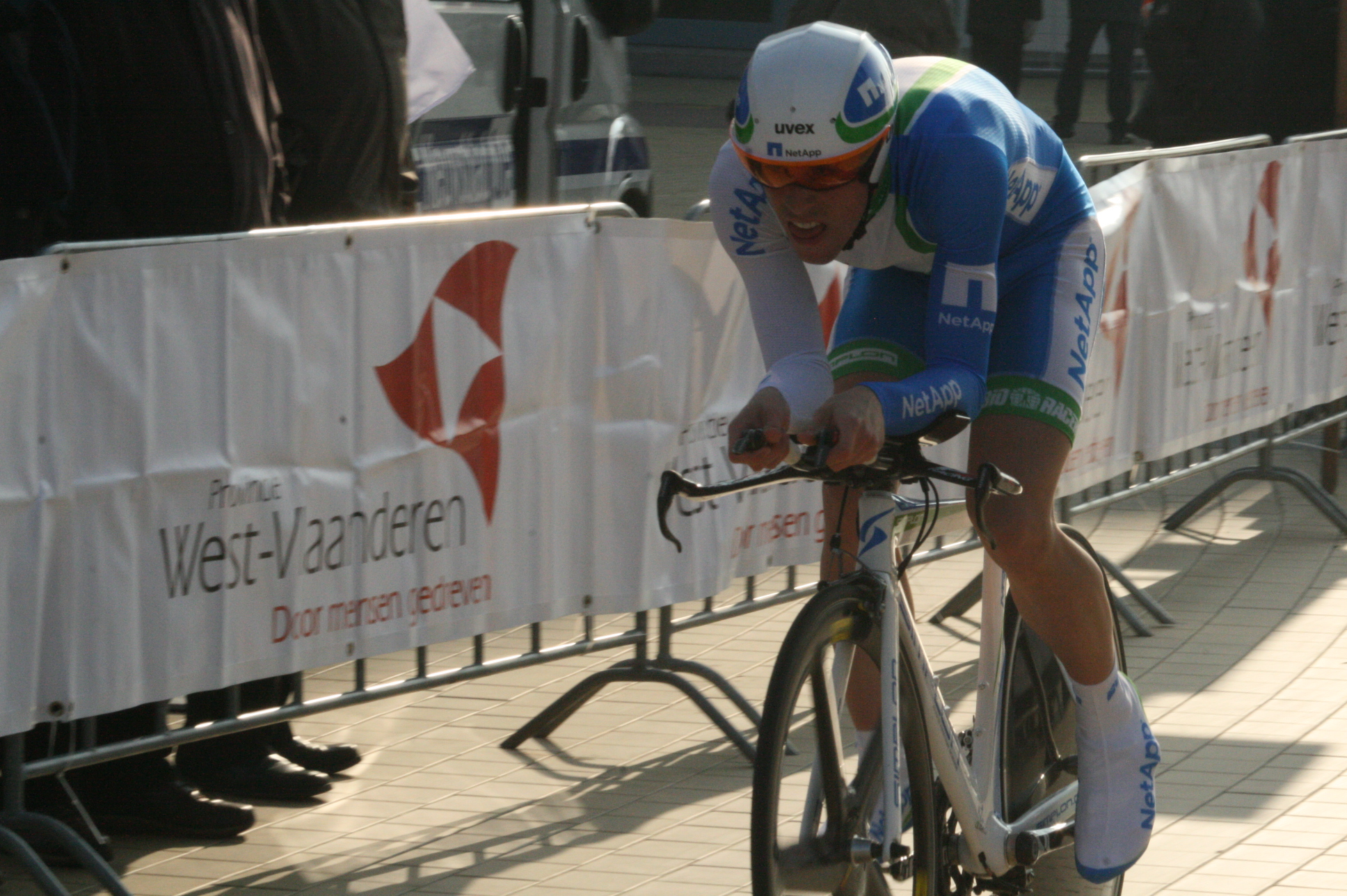
- Bär at the 2011 Driedaagse van West Vlaanderen

Personal information
- Born: 12 March 1988 (age 38) Zug, Switzerland
- Height: 1.8 m (5 ft 11 in)
- Weight: 66 kg (146 lb)

Cycling career
- Sport: Cycling
- Current team: Retired
- Discipline: Road
- Role: Rider

Professional teams
- 2007–2009: Hadimec
- 2010: Atlas Personal–BMC
- 2011: Team NetApp
- 2012: Atlas Personal–Jakroo

Michael Bär (born 12 March 1988) is a Swiss former professional road cyclist.

== Major results ==
2005
1st Paris–Roubaix Juniors
2nd Road race, National Junior Road Championships
7th Overall Grand Prix Rüebliland
2006
1st Road race, National Junior Road Championships
1st Stage 4 Grand Prix Rüebliland
1st Stage 2 Tour de Lorraine
2010
1st Road race, National Under-23 Road Championships
1st Stage 4 Thüringen-Rundfahrt
3rd Giro del Mendrisiotto
