= 1994 UCI Road World Championships – Women's time trial =

Women's Individual Time Trial
1994 UCI Road World Championships
- Rainbow jersey

Race details
- Dates: 25 August 1994 in (Italy) Catania (ITA)
- Stages: 1
- Distance: 30 km (19 mi)
- Winning time: 38' 22"

Medalists
	Gold	Karen Kurreck (USA)
	Silver	Anne Samplonius (CAN)
	Bronze	Jeannie Longo-Ciprelli (FRA)

The Women's Individual Time Trial at the 1994 World Cycling Championships was held on Thursday 25 August 1994, in Agrigento/Catania, Italy over 30 kilometres.

The women's individual time trial (ITT) was added to the world championships as a replacement for the team time trial.

== Final classification ==
Rank	Rider	Country	Time
1st place, gold medalist(s)	Karen Kurreck	United States	38' 22"
2nd place, silver medalist(s)	Anne Samplonius	Canada	+ 45"
3rd place, bronze medalist(s)	Jeannie Longo-Ciprelli	France	+ 1' 22"
4	Clara Hughes	Canada	+ 1' 28"
5	Maria Jongeling	Netherlands	+ 1' 40"
6	Rebecca Twigg	United States	+ 1' 44"
7	Vera Hohlfeld	Germany	+ 1' 56"
8	Marion Clignet	France	+ 2' 00"
9	Imelda Chiappa	Italy	+ 2' 00"
10	Jolanta Polikevičiūtė	Lithuania	+ 2' 10"
11	Tamara Polyakova	Ukraine	+ 2' 10"
12	Edita Pučinskaitė	Lithuania	+ 2' 10"
13	Lone Larson	Denmark	+ 2' 13"
14	Svetlana Bubnenkova	Russia	+ 2' 14"
15	Elena Tchalykh	Ukraine	+ 2' 44"
16	Tea Vikstedt-Nyman	Finland	+ 2' 51"
17	Marie Høljer	Sweden	+ 2' 52"
18	Valentina Polkhanova	Russia	+ 2' 56"
19	Zinaida Stahurskaya	Belarus	+ 2' 59"
20	Nuria Florencio	Spain	+ 3' 02"
21	Bogumiła Matusiak	Poland	+ 3' 07"
22	Susanne Ljungskog	Sweden	+ 3' 12"
23	Luzia Zberg	Switzerland	+ 3' 33"
24	Tracey Watson	Australia	+ 3' 38"
25	Heidi Van De Vijver	Belgium	+ 3' 45"
26	Cordula Gruber	Germany	+ 4' 06"
27	Patricia Santiago	Argentina	+ 4' 20"
28	Natasha den Ouden	Netherlands	+ 4' 21"
29	Samantha Rizzi	Italy	+ 4' 21"
30	Izasqun Bengoa-Pérez	Spain	+ 4' 23"
31	May-Britt Valand	Norway	+ 4' 29"
32	Lenka Ilavská	Slovakia	+ 4' 42"
33	Maria Heim	Switzerland	+ 5' 01"
34	Irina Safonova	Belarus	+ 5' 48"
35	Pavlina Daněčková	Czech Republic	+ 5' 54"
36	Casilda Riquelme	Argentina	+ 6' 10"
37	Bony Eshel	Israel	+ 6' 21"
