= Simon Pellaud =

Swiss bicycle racer (born 1992)

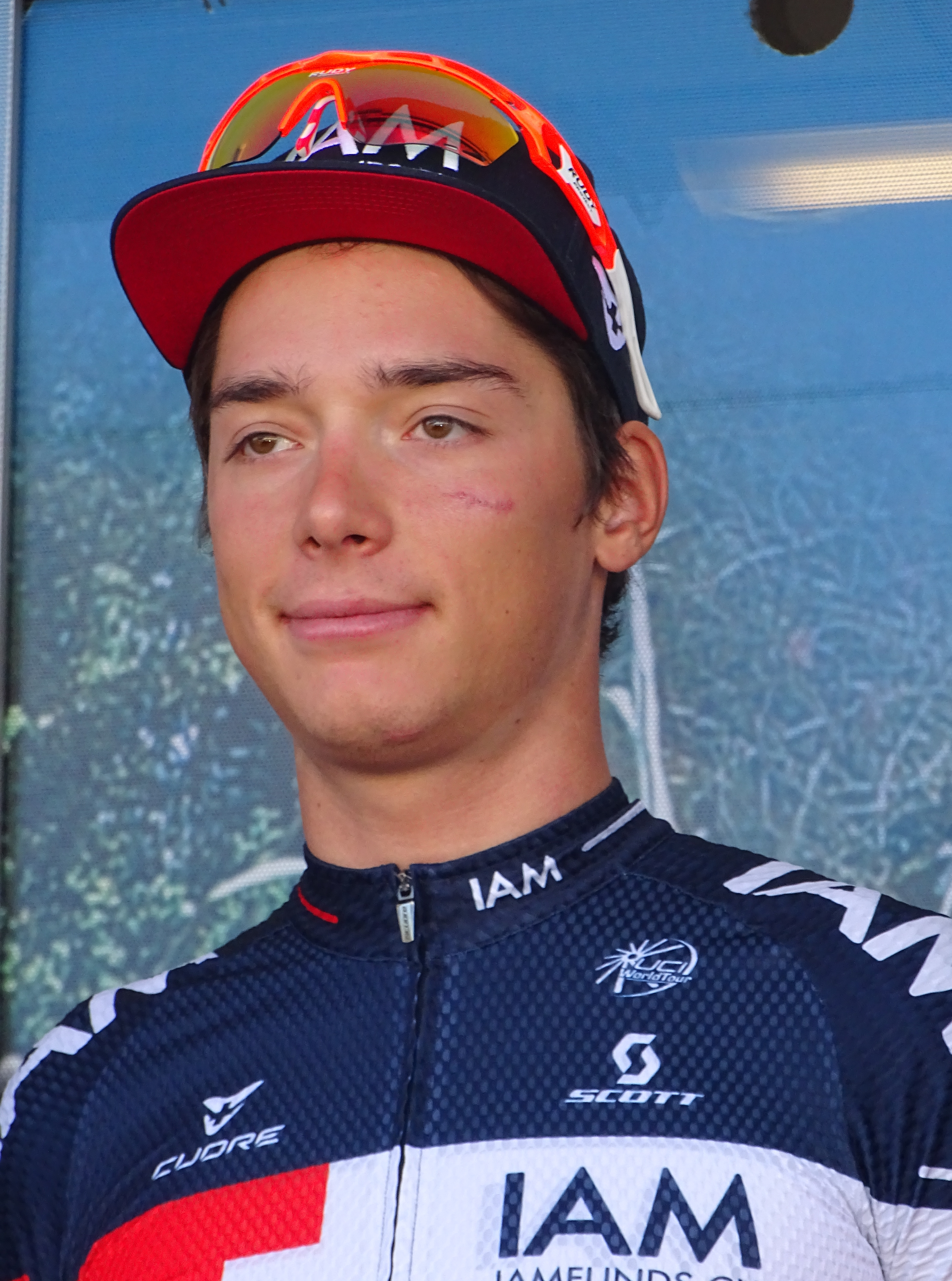

Personal information
- Full name: Simon Pellaud
- Born: 6 November 1992 (age 33) Locarno, Switzerland
- Height: 1.79 m (5 ft 10 in)
- Weight: 70 kg (154 lb)

Cycling career
- Sport: Cycling
- Current team: Li-Ning Star
- Disciplines: Road; Gravel
- Role: Rider

Amateur teams
- 2011: Atlas Personal (stagiaire)
- 2013: Maca–Loca Scott
- 2014: Roth–Felt

Professional teams
- 2012: Atlas Personal–Jakroo
- 2014: IAM Cycling (stagiaire)
- 2015–2016: IAM Cycling
- 2017–2018: Team Illuminate
- 2019: IAM–Excelsior
- 2020–2021: Androni Giocattoli–Sidermec
- 2022: Trek–Segafredo
- 2023–2024: Tudor Pro Cycling Team
- 2025–: Li-Ning Star

Simon Pellaud (born 6 November 1992) is a Swiss cyclist who currently rides for UCI Continental team Li-Ning Star. He was named in the start-list for the 2015 Vuelta a España. In October 2020, he was named in the start-list for the 2020 Giro d'Italia.

== Biography ==
Pellaud lives in Antioquia, Colombia.

== Major results ==
=== Road ===
2010
1st Tour de Berne Juniors
6th Overall Tour du Pays de Vaud
2011
7th Overall Grand Prix Chantal Biya
2013
1st Road race, National Under-23 Championships
3rd Paris–Chauny
2014
4th La Côte Picarde
2016
4th Road race, National Championships
Combativity award Stage 3 Vuelta a España
2017
10th Overall Tour of Rwanda

1st Stage 2

2018 (1 pro win)
1st Stage 9 Tour of Hainan
2nd Overall Tour of Almaty
4th Overall Tour of Romania
2019
1st Overall Tour de la Mirabelle
1st Mountains classification, Tour de Romandie
1st Flèche Ardennaise
2nd Road race, National Championships
3rd Overall Giro del Friuli-Venezia Giulia
5th Tour du Doubs
8th Overall Tour du Loir-et-Cher

1st Stage 1

2020
3rd Road race, National Championships
2021
1st Stage 8 Vuelta al Táchira
2nd Road race, National Championships
4th Gran Premio di Lugano
2023
1st Overall Tour de Bretagne

1st Mountains classification

1st Mountains classification, Tour de Langkawi
3rd Road race, National Championships
2024
2nd Road race, National Championships
2025 (2)
1st Tour of Binzhou
1st Stage 1 Tour of Thailand
8th Overall Tour of Huangshan

==== Grand Tour general classification results timeline ====
Grand Tour	2015	2016	2017	2018	2019	2020	2021
Giro d'Italia	—	—	—	—	—	71	69
Tour de France	—	—	—	—	—	—	—
Vuelta a España	119	105	—	—	—	—	—

Legend
—	Did not compete
DNF	Did not finish

=== Gravel ===
2024
3rd Bern
7th European Championships
2025
UCI World Series

1st Brazil

1st Overall Transcordilleras

1st Stages 2, 4, 5 & 7

1st Festivus of Gravel
2nd Unbound Gravel 200
