= Lukas Spengler =

Swiss bicycle racer

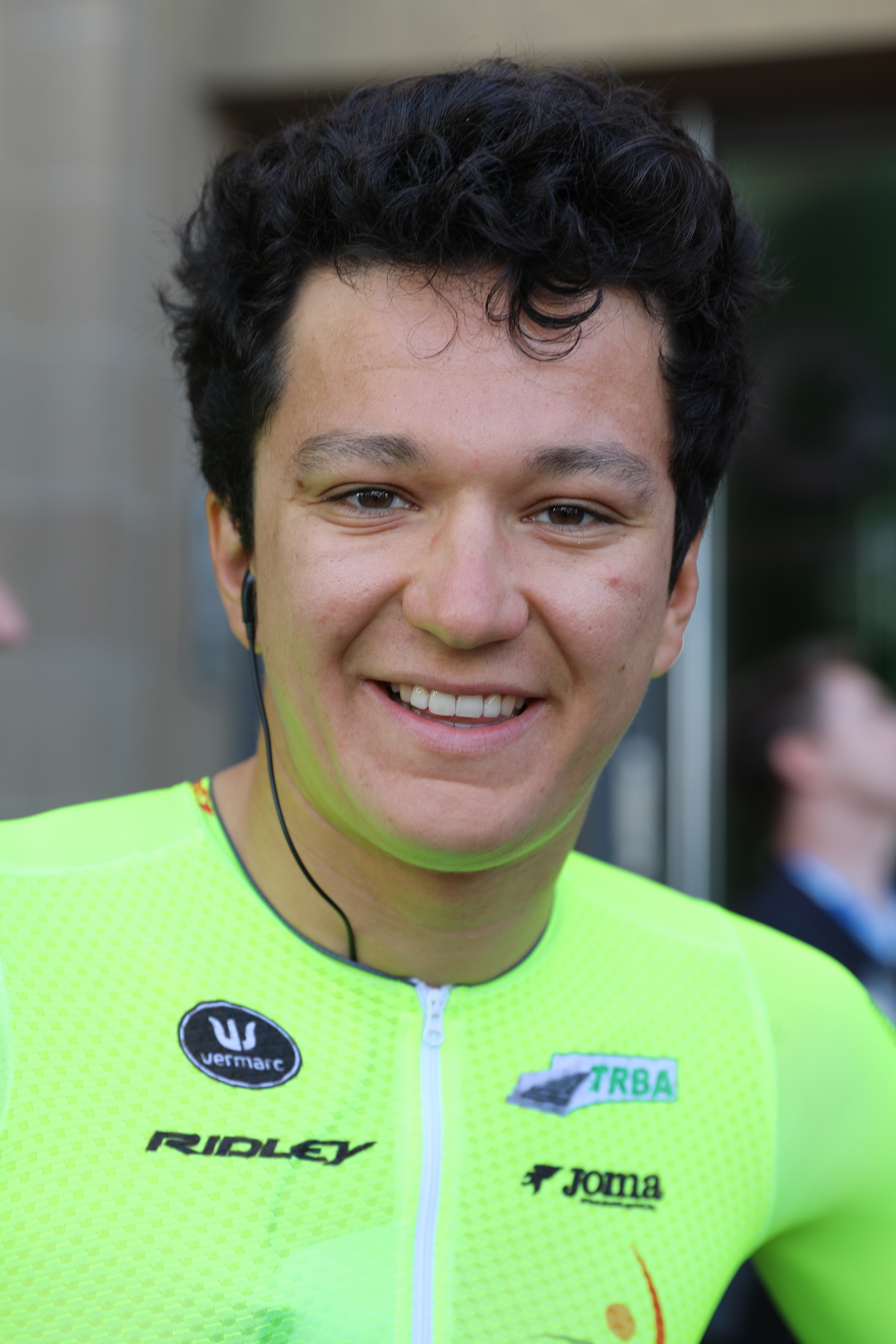
- Spengler in 2019

Personal information
- Full name: Lukas Spengler
- Born: 16 September 1994 (age 32) Schaffhausen, Switzerland
- Height: 1.88 m (6 ft 2 in)
- Weight: 78 kg (172 lb)

Cycling career
- Sport: Cycling
- Current team: Retired
- Discipline: Road
- Role: Rider

Amateur teams
- 2012: RRC Diessenhofen
- 2013: Atlas Personal–Jakroo (stagiaire)
- 2014–2016: BMC Development Team

Professional team
- 2017–2019: WB Veranclassic Aqua Protect

Lukas Spengler (born 16 September 1994) is a Swiss former professional cyclist, who rode professionally for the Wallonie Bruxelles team from 2017 to 2019.

== Major results ==
2011
2nd Road race, National Junior Road Championships
2012
3rd Time trial, National Junior Road Championships
2014
2nd Road race, National Under-23 Road Championships
3rd Triptyque Ardennais
3rd Züri-Metzgete
5th ZLM Tour
5th Gran Premio Palio del Recioto
7th Giro del Belvedere
2015
1st Paris–Roubaix Espoirs
3rd Road race, National Under-23 Road Championships
2016
1st Prologue (TTT) Tour de Berlin
2nd Time trial, National Under-23 Road Championships
2017
5th Tour de Berne
5th Schaal Sels
