= Ernst Fuchs =

Ernst Fuchs may refer to:

- Ernst Fuchs (artist) (1930–2015), Austrian artist
- Ernst Fuchs (cyclist) (1936–1994), Swiss cyclist
- Ernst Fuchs (doctor) (1851–1930), Austrian ophthalmologist
- Ernst Fuchs (theologian) (1903–1983) German New Testament scholar and student of Rudolf Bultmann
- Ernest Fooks (1906–1985) Australian architect
