= Stausee-Rundfahrt Klingnau =

Cycling competition

Race details
- Date: Late March
- Region: Aargau, Switzerland
- English name: Tour of Stausee Klingnau
- Local name(s): Stausee-Rundfahrt Klingnau (in German)
- Discipline: Road
- Competition: UCI Europe Tour
- Type: Single-day
- Organiser: VC Klingnau

History
- First edition: 1949
- Editions: 55 (as of 2005)
- First winner: Fritz Zbinden (SUI)
- Most wins: Gilbert Glaus (SUI) (4 wins)
- Most recent: Danilo Napolitano (ITA)

The Stausee Rundfahrt-Klingnau (English: Tour of Stausee Klingnau) is a road bicycle race held annually in Klingnau in the canton of Aargau in Switzerland. Since 2005, it has been organised as a 1.1 event on the UCI Europe Tour, although since 2006 it hasn't been held.

== Winners ==
Year	Country	Rider	Team
1949	Switzerland	Fritz Zbinden	
1950	Switzerland	Franz Lustenberger	
1951	Switzerland	Fritz Zbinden	
1952	Switzerland	Carlo Lafranchi	
1953	Italy	Remo Pianezzi	
1954	No race		
1955	Switzerland	Harry Müller	
1956	Switzerland	Roman Brunner	
1957	Switzerland	Hans Schleuniger	
1958	Switzerland	Erwin Jaisli	
1959	No race		
1960	Switzerland	Walter Signer	
1961	Switzerland	Werner Bernet	
1962	Switzerland	Gilbert Villars	
1963	Switzerland	Werner Weber	
1964	Switzerland	Auguste Girard	
1965	Switzerland	Hans Stadelmann	
1966	Switzerland	Leone Scurio	
1967	West Germany	Herbert Mayer	
1968	Switzerland	René Rutschmann	
1969	Switzerland	Roberto Puttini	
1970	Switzerland	Pietro Poloni	
1971	Switzerland	John Hugentobler	
1972	Switzerland	René Savary	
1973	Belgium	Yvan Ronsse	
1974	Switzerland	Pietro Ugolini	
1975	Switzerland	Roland Salm	
1976	Switzerland	Urs Berger	
1977	Switzerland	Fritz Jost	
1978	Netherlands	Gerrit Moehlmann	
1979	Switzerland	Gilbert Glaus	
1980	Switzerland	Marcel Summermatter	
1981	Switzerland	Gilbert Glaus	
1982	Switzerland	Erich Mächler	
1983	Switzerland	Benno Wiss	
1984	Switzerland	Benno Wiss	
1985	Switzerland	Remo Gugole	
1986	Switzerland	Thomas Wegmüller	
1987	Switzerland	Kurt Steinmann	
1988	Switzerland	Rolf Järmann	
1989	Switzerland	Gilbert Glaus	
1990	Switzerland	Roland Baltisser	
1991	Switzerland	Simone Pedrazzini	
1992	Switzerland	Gilbert Glaus	
1993	Switzerland	Roland Meier	
1994	Switzerland	Armin Meier	
1995	Switzerland	Philipp Buschor	
1996	Germany	Andreas Lebsanft	
1997	Switzerland	Niki Aebersold	
1998	Switzerland	Markus Zberg	
1999	Germany	Torsten Nitsche	
2000	Switzerland	Martin Elmiger	
2001	Latvia	Andris Naudužs	
2002	Italy	Massimo Strazzer	
2003	Slovenia	Uros Murn	
2004	Latvia	Andris Naudužs	
2005	Italy	Danilo Napolitano	
