= Lequatre =

Lequatre is a French surname. Notable people with the surname include:

- Geoffroy Lequatre (born 1981), French cyclist
- Marcel Lequatre (1882–1960), Swiss cyclist
