= Pierre Bourquenoud =

Swiss cyclist (born 1969)

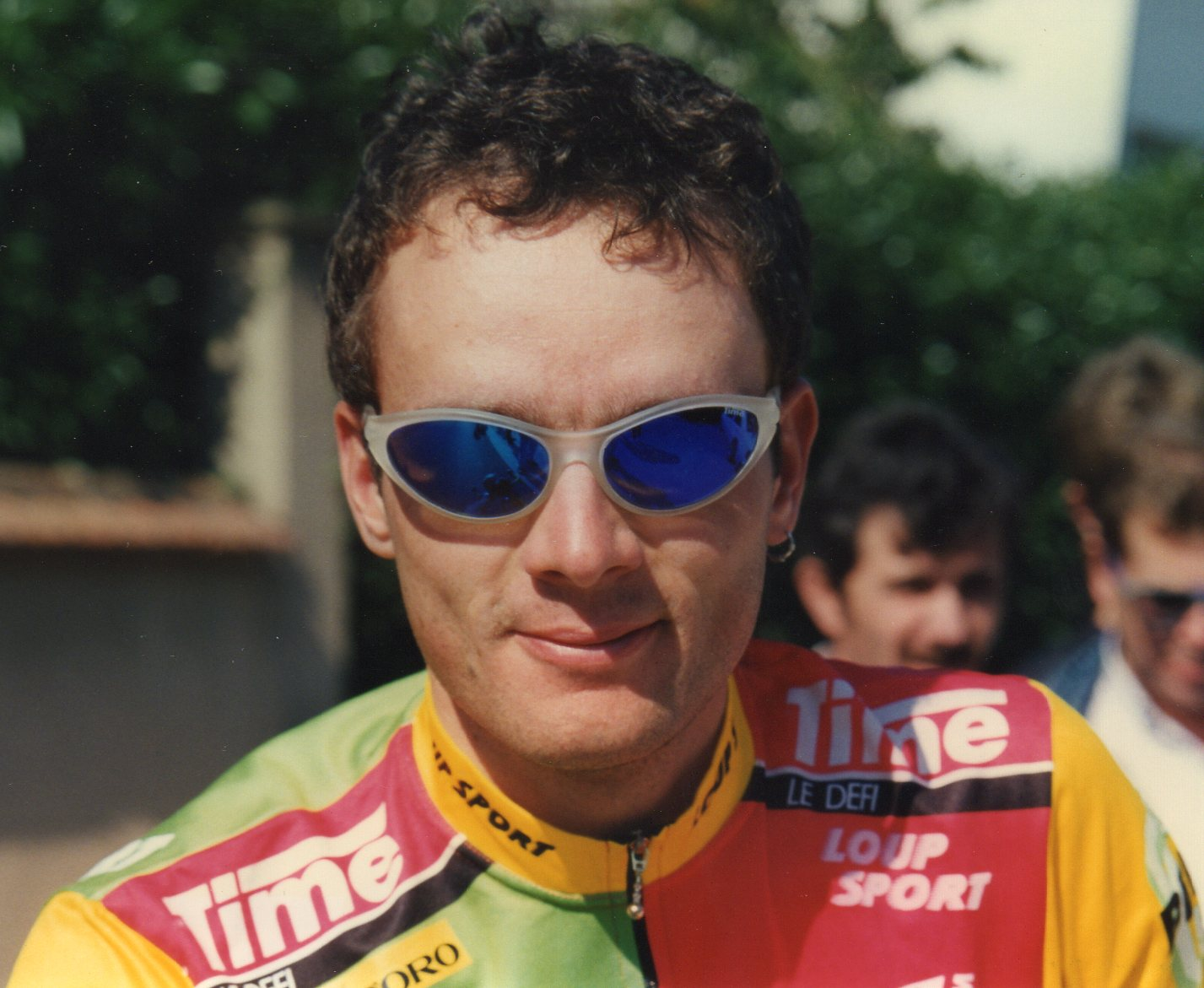

Personal information
- Born: 21 November 1969 (age 56) Vaulruz, Switzerland

Cycling career
- Sport: Cycling
- Current team: Retired
- Discipline: Road
- Role: Rider

Professional teams
- 1996–1999: PMU Romand–Bepsa
- 2000–2001: Phonak
- 2002–2003: Saint-Quentin–Oktos
- 2004: R.A.G.T. Semences–MG Rover

Pierre Bourquenoud (born 21 November 1969 in Vaulruz) is a Swiss former professional road cyclist. His sporting career began with VC Pedale Bulloise.

== Major results ==
1997
3rd Overall 3-Länder-Tour
1999
2nd Grand Prix Winterthur
2000
1st Grand Prix Winterthur
3rd Tour du Doubs
5th Tour de Berne
2001
2nd Road race, National Road Championships
2nd Grand Prix Winterthur
3rd Tour du Jura
2002
1st Stage 12 Vuelta Ciclista de Chile
2nd Tour du Doubs
2nd Tour de la Somme
3rd Road race, National Road Championships
5th Trophée des Grimpeurs
6th Tour du Lac Léman
2003
4th GP de Denain
7th Classique des Alpes
9th Overall Route du Sud
