= Albert Furrer =

Swiss cyclist

Personal information
- Full name: Jakob Albert Furrer
- Born: April 10, 1873 Zürich, Switzerland
- Died: October 2, 1916 (aged 43) Oconomowoc, Waukesha, Wisconsin, United States of America

Cycling career
- Sport: Cycling
- Role: Rider

Major wins
- 1898 Swiss Road Championship

Albert Furrer was a Swiss racing cyclist. He was the Swiss National Road Race champion in 1898.
