= Steve Bovay =

Swiss cyclist

Personal information
- Born: 25 November 1984 (age 41) Vevey, Switzerland

Cycling career
- Sport: Cycling
- Current team: Retired
- Discipline: Road
- Role: Rider
- Rider type: All-rounder

Professional team
- 2008–2009: BMC Racing Team

Steve Bovay (born 25 November 1984) is a Swiss former cyclist.

== Major results ==
2004
3rd Road race, National Under-23 Road Championships
2006
6th Overall GP Tell
2007
5th Tour du Jura
2009
9th Overall Tour de Beauce
