= Bruno Wolfer =

Swiss cyclist

Personal information
- Born: 10 September 1954 (age 72) Elgg, Switzerland

Cycling career
- Sport: Cycling
- Current team: Retired
- Discipline: Road
- Role: Rider

Professional teams
- 1976–1979: Zonca-Santini
- 1980–1981: Bianchi–Piaggio
- 1982: Royal-Wrangler-Oliver Tex
- 1983: Eorotex–Magniflex

Bruno Wolfer (born 10 September 1954 in Elgg) is a Swiss former cyclist.

== Major results ==
1976
2nd Overall Grand Prix Guillaume Tell
1977
1st Stage 9 Tour de Suisse
1st Tour du lac Léman
3rd Gran Premio di Lugano
1978
2nd Tour de Berne
10th Overall Tour de Romandie

1st Prologue

10th Overall Tirreno–Adriatico
1979
1st Stage 6 Giro d'Italia
2nd National Road Race Championships
3rd Tour du lac Léman
1980
3rd Coppa Agostoni
1981
1st Nizza–Alassio
2nd Giro del Piemonte
1982
2nd National Road Race Championships
1983
3rd National Road Race Championships
