= Caroline Baur =

Swiss cyclist

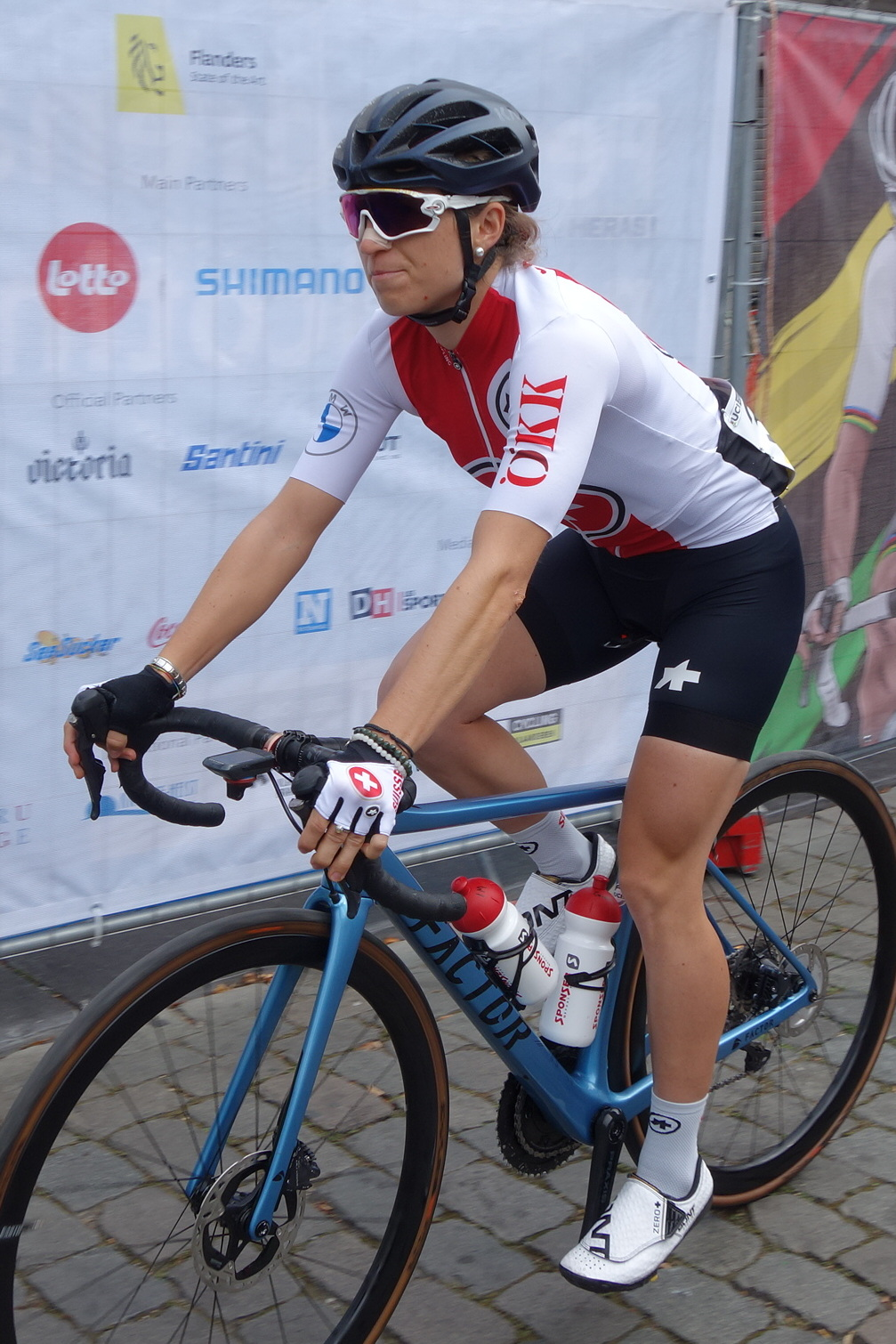

Personal information
- Born: 17 April 1994 (age 32) Rheinfelden (Baden), Germany

Cycling career
- Sport: Cycling
- Discipline: Road
- Role: Rider

Amateur teams
- 2011–2013: Bigla Cycling Team
- 2015: De Sprinters Malderen (guest)
- 2017: ISCorp p/b Progress Software (guest)
- 2018: ISCorp p/b Progress Software
- 2019–2020: Capital Wealth Advisors p/b Trek

Professional teams
- 2015: Bigla Pro Cycling Team
- 2021: InstaFund Racing
- 2022–2023: Roland Cogeas Edelweiss Squad

Major wins
- One-day races and Classics National Road Race Championships (2022)

Caroline Baur (born 17 April 1994) is a Swiss professional racing cyclist, who last rode for UCI Women's WorldTeam Israel Premier Tech Roland.
