= Anne Samplonius =

Canadian road cyclist

Personal information
- Born: February 11, 1968 (age 58) Grand Rapids, Michigan, United States
- Height: 160 cm (5 ft 3 in)
- Weight: 53 kg (117 lb)

Cycling career
- Sport: Cycling
- Discipline: Road cycling

Professional teams
- 1998: Quebec Air Transat
- 2000: Saturn Cycling Team
- 2001: Intersport
- 2003: TDS
- 2007: Team Expresscopy.com
- 2009: Team Lip Smacker
- 2011–2012: NOW and Novartis for MS

Anne Samplonius (born February 11, 1968) is a road cyclist from Canada. She was born in the United States, has lived most of her life in Canada, and is a citizen of both countries. Samplonius graduated from the University of Alberta with a bachelor's degree in Recreational Administration in 1992. She was a silver medallist in the time trial at the 1994 UCI Road World Championships, and was a double winner of the Canadian National Time Trial Championships. Samplonius also won the gold medal in the time trial at the 2007 Pan American Games. She represented her nation at the 2000, 2001, 2006, 2007, 2008 and 2010 UCI Road World Championships. She competed in 12 World Championships during her career, and retired from racing at the end of 2012. Following her retirement Samplonius joined Trek Factory Racing as their content manager in November 2013, after working as online digital editor for the RusVelo team in 2012. She also works as a cycling coach.

From at least 1992 to 2007, she lived in Brampton.

== Major results ==
1994
2nd UCI Road World Championships – Women's time trial
