= Charles Lugon =

Swiss cyclist

Cycling career
- Sport: Cycling
- Role: Rider

Charles Lugon was a Swiss racing cyclist. He was the Swiss National Road Race champion in 1900.
