= Rudolf Hauser =

Swiss cyclist

Personal information
- Born: 22 November 1937 (age 88) Goldach, Switzerland

Cycling career
- Sport: Cycling
- Discipline: Road
- Role: Rider

Professional teams
- 1963–1965: Cynar–Frejus
- 1966–1968: Tigra–Meltina

Rudolf Hauser (born 22 November 1937) is a Swiss former racing cyclist. He was the Swiss National Road Race champion in 1964. He also rode in the 1967 Tour de France.

== Major results ==
1963
1st Tour du Nord-Ouest
2nd Wartenberg Rundfahrt
1964
1st Road race, National Road Championships
