= Edith Schönenberger =

Swiss cyclist

Personal information
- Born: 20 January 1954 (age 72)

Cycling career
- Sport: Cycling
- Role: Rider

Edith Schönenberger (born 20 January 1954) is a Swiss former racing cyclist. She was the Swiss National Road Race champion in 1984, 1985, 1986, 1987 and 1989. She also competed in the women's road race at the 1988 Summer Olympics.
