= Roland Salm =

Swiss cyclist (born 1950)

Personal information
- Born: 21 February 1950 (age 76) Riniken, Switzerland

Cycling career
- Sport: Cycling
- Current team: Retired
- Discipline: Road
- Role: Rider

Professional teams
- 1974–1977: Zonca
- 1974–1975: Willner
- 1976: Möbel Märki
- 1978: Flandria – Velda
- 1978–1979: Jelmoli – Merosa
- 1980: Puch – Sem
- 1981: Sem – France Loire
- 1981: Merosa
- 1981: Frenzelit

Roland Salm (born 21 February 1950) is a former Swiss professional cyclist. He was the Swiss National Road Race champion in 1974, 1975, 1976 and 1977.

== Palmares ==
1969
Junior Road Champion
1972
1st Prologue Grand Prix Guillaume Tell (TTT)
1973
National points race champion
1st Giro del Lagio Maggiore

1st stages 1 and 2

3rd Stausee-Rundfahrt Klingnau
1974
National Road Race Champion
1st Tour de Berne
2nd Tour du Lac Léman
1975
National Road Race Champion
1st Giro del Veneto
1st Stausee-Rundfahrt Klingnau
1st Tour du Leimenthal
1st Tour de Berne
2nd GP Montelupo
3rd Sassari-Cagliari
1976
National Road Race Champion
2nd Tour Méditerranéen
3rd Tour de Berne
5th Tour de Romandie
1977
National Road Race Champion
1st Rund um die Rigi – Gersau
3rd Grand Prix of Aargau Canton
1980
1st stage 7 Tour de Suisse
1981
1st Rund um die Rigi – Gersau
