= Diana Rast =

Swiss cyclist

Personal information
- Born: 28 August 1970 (age 56)

Cycling career
- Sport: Cycling
- Role: Rider

Diana Rast (born 28 August 1970) is a Swiss former racing cyclist. She was the Swiss National Road Race champion in 2000. She also competed at the 1996 Summer Olympics.
