= Pirmin Lang =

Swiss cyclist (born 1984)

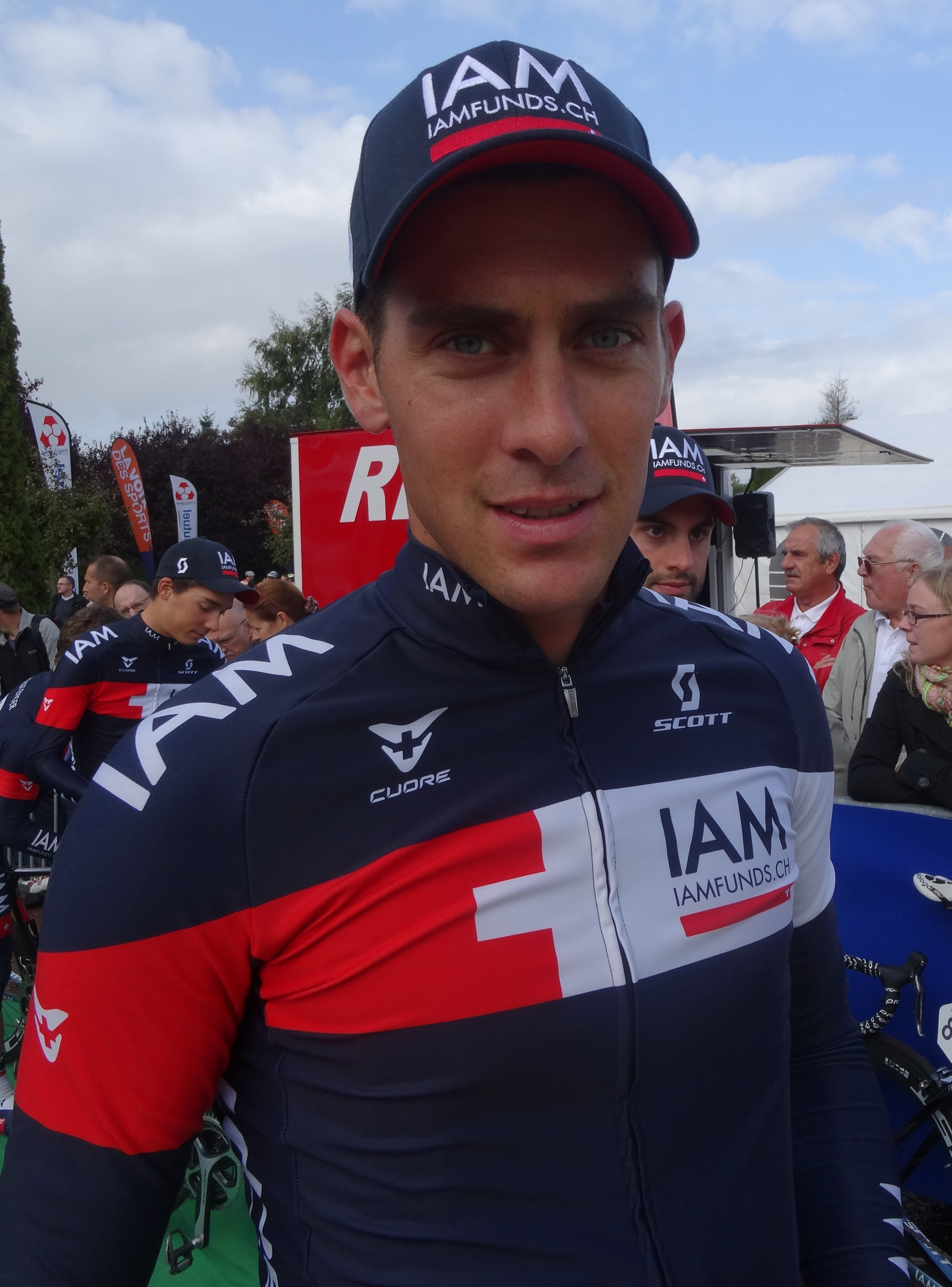
- Lang in 2014

Personal information
- Full name: Pirmin Lang
- Born: 25 November 1984 (age 41) Pfaffnau, Switzerland
- Height: 1.83 m (6 ft 0 in)
- Weight: 73 kg (161 lb)

Cycling career
- Sport: Cycling
- Discipline: Road
- Role: Rider (retired); Directeur sportif

Professional teams
- 2009: Atlas–Romer's Hausbäckerei
- 2010: Team Buergi Fidi BC
- 2011–2012: Atlas Personal
- 2013–2016: IAM Cycling
- 2017: Roth–Akros

Managerial team
- 2019–2020: Swiss Racing Academy

Pirmin Lang (born 25 November 1984) is a Swiss former racing cyclist. He rode in the 2014 Vuelta a España.

In February 2020, he publicly confessed to having used illegal performance enhancing drugs during his career as part of the "Aderlass" network and resigned from his role as Head of Sport at the Swiss Racing Academy team.

== Major results ==
2008
3rd Tour du Jura
2009
6th Tour du Jura
10th Ronde van Noord-Holland
2010
3rd Road race, National Road Championships
4th Overall Oberösterreich Rundfahrt
5th Overall Cinturón a Mallorca
2011
1st Antwerpse Havenpijl
3rd Grand Prix des Marbriers
5th Grand Prix de la Ville de Lillers
6th Time trial, National Road Championships
6th Overall Tour de Bretagne
9th GP du canton d'Argovie
2012
1st Stage 1 Boucles de la Mayenne
4th Road race, National Road Championships
4th Overall An Post Rás

1st Stage 2

2013
7th Val d'Ille Classic
2014
3rd Tour de Berne
2016
2nd Road race, National Road Championships
