= Mirjam Gysling =

Swiss cyclist (born 1987)

Personal information
- Born: 2 May 1987 (age 39)

Cycling career
- Sport: Cycling
- Role: Rider

Mirjam Gysling (born 2 May 1987) is a Swiss racing cyclist. She was the Swiss National Road Race champion in 2014.
