= Edouard Wicky =

Swiss cyclist

Cycling career
- Sport: Cycling
- Role: Rider

Edouard Wicky was a Swiss racing cyclist. He was the Swiss National Road Race champion in 1892 and 1893.
