= Ernst Dubach =

Swiss cyclist (1881–1982)

Personal information
- Born: 20 January 1881 Biel-Bienne, Switzerland
- Died: 14 January 1982 (aged 100) Biel-Bienne, Switzerland

Cycling career
- Sport: Cycling
- Role: Rider

Ernst Dubach (20 January 1881 – 14 January 1982) was a Swiss racing cyclist. He was the Swiss National Road Race champion in 1902.

== See also ==
- List of centenarians (sportspeople)
