= Stefania Carmine =

Swiss cyclist

Personal information
- Born: 13 December 1966 (age 59) Ponte Capriasca, Switzerland

Cycling career
- Sport: Cycling
- Role: Rider

Stefania Carmine (born 13 December 1966) is a Swiss former racing cyclist. She was the Swiss National Road Race champion in 1982.
