= Henri Favre =

Swiss cyclist

Cycling career
- Sport: Cycling
- Role: Rider

Henri Favre was a Swiss racing cyclist. He was the Swiss National Road Race champion in 1894 and 1895.
