= Sébastien Reichenbach =

Swiss cyclist

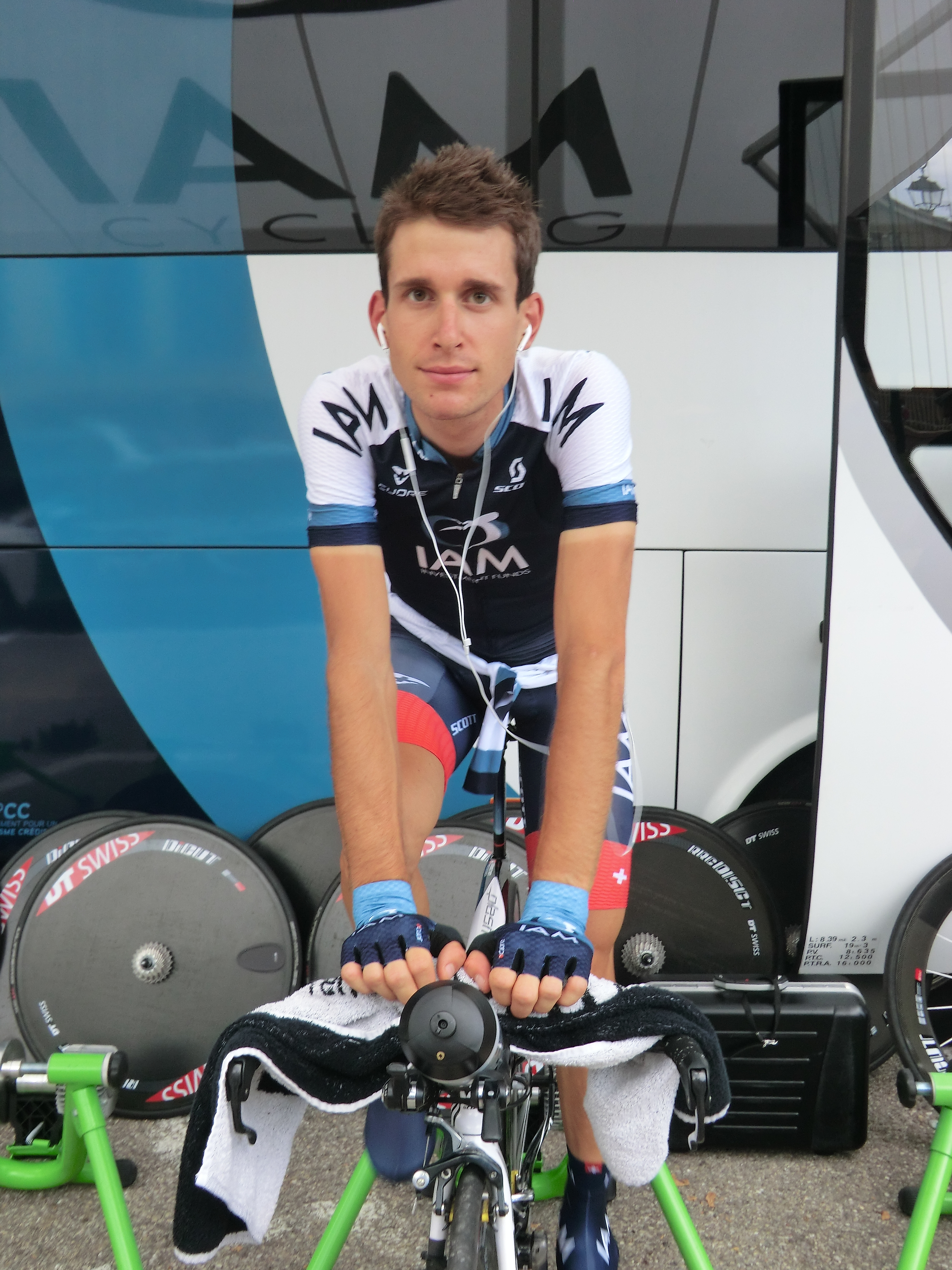
- Reichenbach at the 2013 Tour de l'Ain.

Personal information
- Born: 28 May 1989 (age 37) Martigny, Switzerland
- Height: 1.78 m (5 ft 10 in)
- Weight: 64 kg (141 lb; 10.1 st)

Cycling career
- Sport: Cycling
- Current team: Retired
- Discipline: Road
- Role: Rider
- Rider type: Climber; Domestique

Amateur team
- 2012: Maca-Loca-Scott

Professional teams
- 2010–2011: Atlas Personal–BMC
- 2013–2015: IAM Cycling
- 2016–2022: FDJ
- 2023–2024: Tudor Pro Cycling Team

Major wins
- One-day races and Classics National Road Race Championships (2019)

Sébastien Reichenbach (born 28 May 1989) is a Swiss former cyclist, who competed as a professional from 2010 to 2024. During his professional career, he competed for Atlas Personal (2010–2011), IAM Cycling (2013–2015), Groupama–FDJ (2016–2022) and Tudor Pro Cycling Team (2023–2024).

Since turning professional, Reichenbach has taken two career victories – the 2013 Trofeo Matteotti and the 2019 Swiss National Road Race Championships.

== Major results ==
2011
3rd Overall Grand Prix Chantal Biya
10th Overall Tour du Gévaudan Languedoc-Roussillon
2012
1st Züri-Metzgete amateurs
7th Overall Oberösterreich Rundfahrt
10th Piccolo Giro di Lombardia
2013
1st Trofeo Matteotti
2nd Tour de Berne
4th Overall Tour de l'Ain
8th Overall Tour of Britain
2014
9th Brabantse Pijl
2015
2nd Road race, National Road Championships
2016
4th Overall Tirreno–Adriatico
5th Road race, National Road Championships
6th Tour du Doubs
2017
7th Overall Vuelta a Andalucía
2018
4th Time trial, National Road Championships
4th Overall Route d'Occitanie
5th Milano–Torino
10th Giro dell'Emilia
2019
1st Road race, National Road Championships
8th Overall Tour du Limousin
2020
10th Overall Route d'Occitanie
2021
2nd Overall Tour Alsace
4th Overall Tour du Limousin
10th Overall Vuelta a Burgos
2022
2nd Road race, National Road Championships
6th Overall Tour de l'Ain
10th Mercan'Tour Classic
2023
6th Overall Tour de l'Ain
2024
6th Overall Tour of Antalya

=== Grand Tour general classification results timeline ===
Grand Tour	2014	2015	2016	2017	2018	2019	2020	2021	2022
Giro d'Italia	—	DNF	—	15	22	—	—	DNF	—
Tour de France	85	—	14	—	—	17	24	—	—
Vuelta a España	—	—	—	—	—	—	—	—	24

Legend
—	Did not compete
DNF	Did not finish
