= Jean Viarret =

Swiss cyclist

Cycling career
- Sport: Cycling
- Role: Rider

Jean Viarret was a Swiss racing cyclist. He was the Swiss National Road Race champion in 1896 and 1897.
