= Maria Heim =

Swiss cyclist

Personal information
- Born: 13 December 1966 (age 59)

Cycling career
- Sport: Cycling
- Role: Rider

Maria Heim (born 16 August 1970) is a Swiss former racing cyclist. She was the Swiss National Road Race champion in 1996.
