= Kastor Notter =

Swiss cyclist

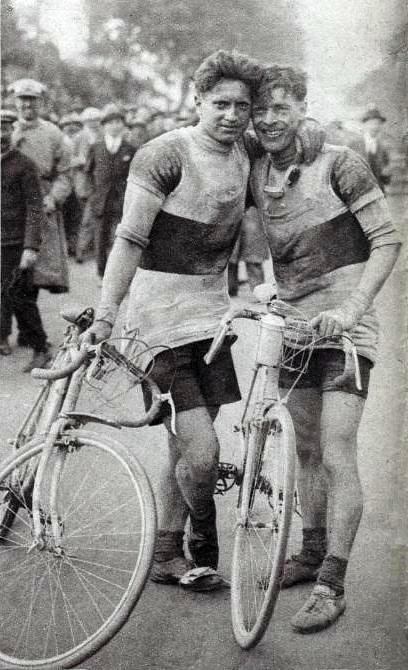

Personal information
- Born: 16 February 1903 Niederrohrdorf, Switzerland
- Died: 9 January 1950 (aged 46) Brunnen, Switzerland

Cycling career
- Sport: Cycling
- Role: Rider

Kastor Notter (16 February 1903 – 9 January 1950) was a Swiss racing cyclist. He was the Swiss National Road Race champion in 1924, 1925 and 1927. He finished in fifth place in the 1926 Paris–Roubaix.
