= Marcel Lequatre =

Swiss cyclist (1882–1960)

Personal information
- Full name: Marcel Lequatre
- Born: 29 September 1882 Yverdon, Switzerland
- Died: 14 November 1960 (aged 78) Genève, Switzerland

Cycling career
- Sport: Cycling
- Discipline: Road / Track
- Role: Rider

Major wins
- Romanshorn - Genève (1902, 1904, 1908); Bern - Genève (1908, 1909, 1910, 1918); Tour du Lac Léman (1906)

Marcel Lequatre (29 September 1882 – 14 November 1960) was a Swiss road racing cyclist.

== Career ==
Lequatre was a professional cyclist from 1902 to 1919. In 1904, he won the Swiss National Road racing title and both in 1906 and 1907 he was selected the Swiss National Motor-paced racing champion. He holds records winning the ancient Swiss classic races Romanshorn - Genève three times and Bern - Genève four times. In 1906, he also won the Tour du Lac Léman, one of the oldest cycling classics in the world, and in 1908 he ranked sixth in Milan - San Remo

Lequatre started the Tour de France three times: in 1903 in the first tour, as well as in 1907 and 1908. Each time, though, he abandoned the race after a few stages.
