= Henri Guillod =

Swiss cyclist

Personal information
- Born: 15 October 1901 Payerne, Switzerland
- Died: 22 March 1979 (aged 77) Lausanne, Switzerland

Cycling career
- Sport: Cycling
- Role: Rider

Henri Guillod (15 October 1901 – 22 March 1979) was a Swiss racing cyclist. He was the Swiss National Road Race champion in 1923.
