= Otto Wiedmer =

Swiss cyclist (1889–?)

Personal information
- Born: 1 November 1889 Geneva, Switzerland

Cycling career
- Sport: Cycling
- Role: Rider

Otto Wiedmer (born 1 November 1889, date of death unknown) was a Swiss racing cyclist. He was the Swiss National Road Race champion in 1913.
