= Marcel Perrière =

Swiss cyclist

Personal information
- Born: 22 November 1890 Geneva, Switzerland
- Died: 6 August 1966 (aged 75) Unterseen, Switzerland

Cycling career
- Sport: Cycling
- Role: Rider

Marcel Perrière (22 November 1890 – 6 August 1966) was a Swiss racing cyclist. He was the Swiss National Road Race champion in 1911. He also rode in the 1914 Tour de France.
