= Isabelle Michel =

Swiss cyclist

Cycling career
- Sport: Cycling
- Role: Rider

Isabelle Michel is a Swiss former racing cyclist. She was the Swiss National Road Race champion in 1988.
