= Sereina Trachsel =

Swiss cyclist

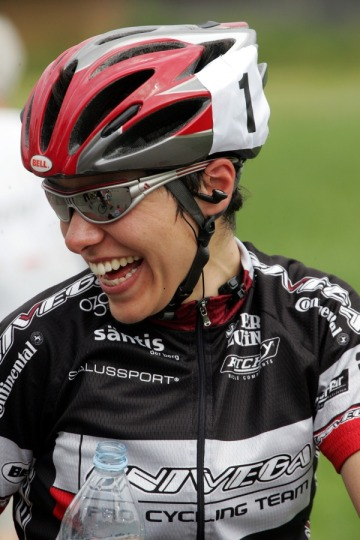
- Sereina Trachsel, 2005

Personal information
- Born: 9 February 1981 (age 45) Weiach, Switzerland

Cycling career
- Sport: Cycling
- Role: Rider

Sereina Trachsel (born 9 February 1981) is a Swiss former racing cyclist. She was the Swiss National Road Race champion in 2004, 2005 and 2007.
