= Marcel Aregger =

Swiss cyclist

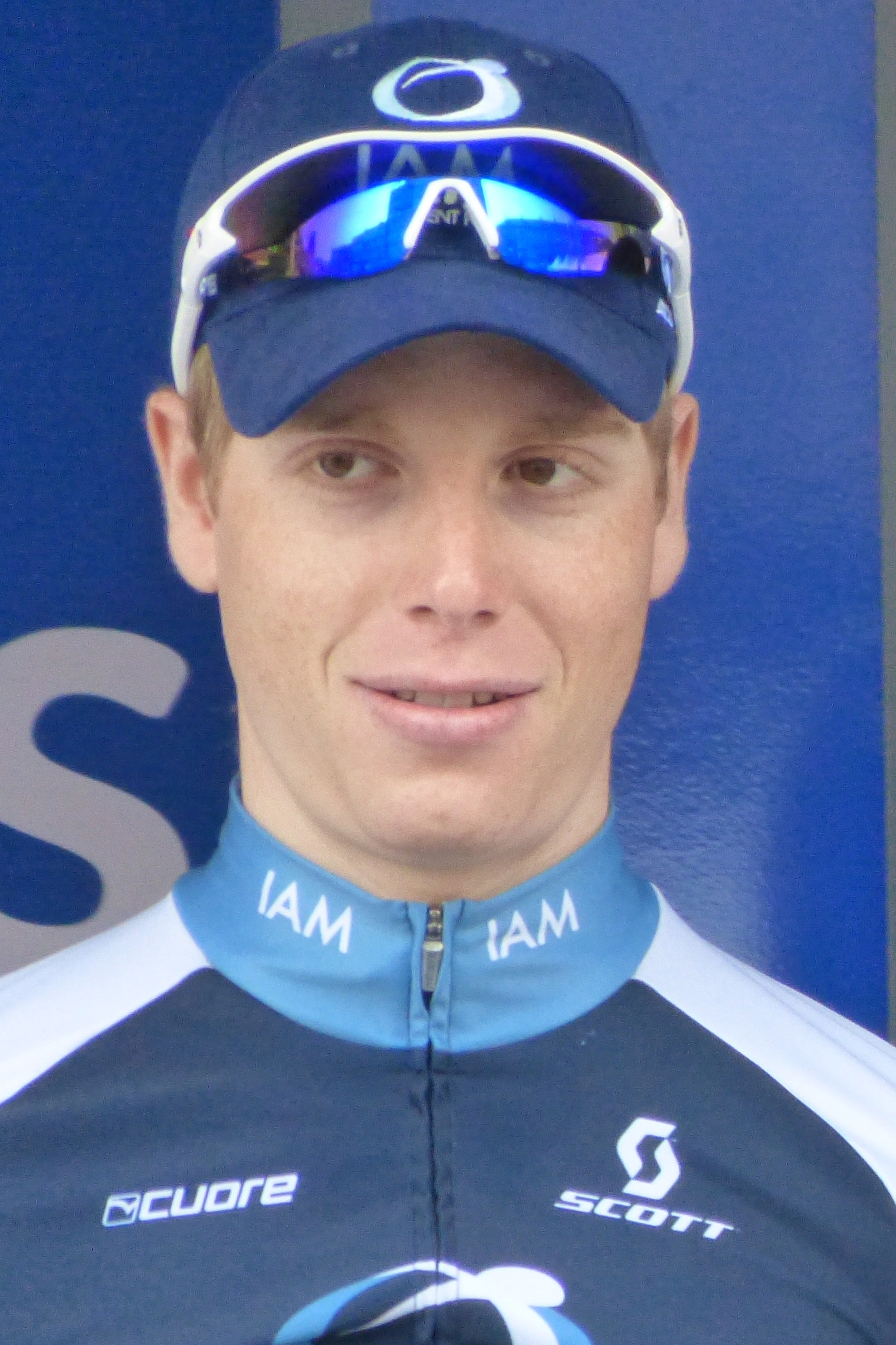
- Aregger in 2013

Personal information
- Full name: Marcel Aregger
- Born: 26 August 1990 (age 36) Unterägeri, Switzerland
- Height: 1.83 m (6 ft 0 in)
- Weight: 70 kg (154 lb)

Cycling career
- Sport: Cycling
- Current team: Retired
- Discipline: Road
- Role: Rider

Amateur team
- 2010–2011: Price–Custom Bikes

Professional teams
- 2012: Atlas Personal–Jakroo
- 2013–2016: IAM Cycling

Marcel Aregger (born 26 August 1990) is a Swiss former professional racing cyclist. He rode in the Vuelta a España in 2014, and 2015, finishing 117th and 106th respectively.

== Major results ==
2010
7th Eschborn–Frankfurt Under–23
2011
1st Road race, National Under-23 Road Championships
8th Sparkassen Giro Bochum
2012
9th Paris–Troyes
