= Henri Rheinwald =

Swiss cyclist

Personal information
- Born: 24 July 1884 Le Locle, Switzerland
- Died: 24 April 1968 (aged 83) Geneva, Switzerland

Cycling career
- Sport: Cycling
- Role: Rider

Henri Rheinwald (24 July 1884 – 24 April 1968) was a Swiss racing cyclist. He was the Swiss National Road Race champion in 1908, 1912 and 1919.
