= Armin Meier (cyclist) =

Swiss cyclist

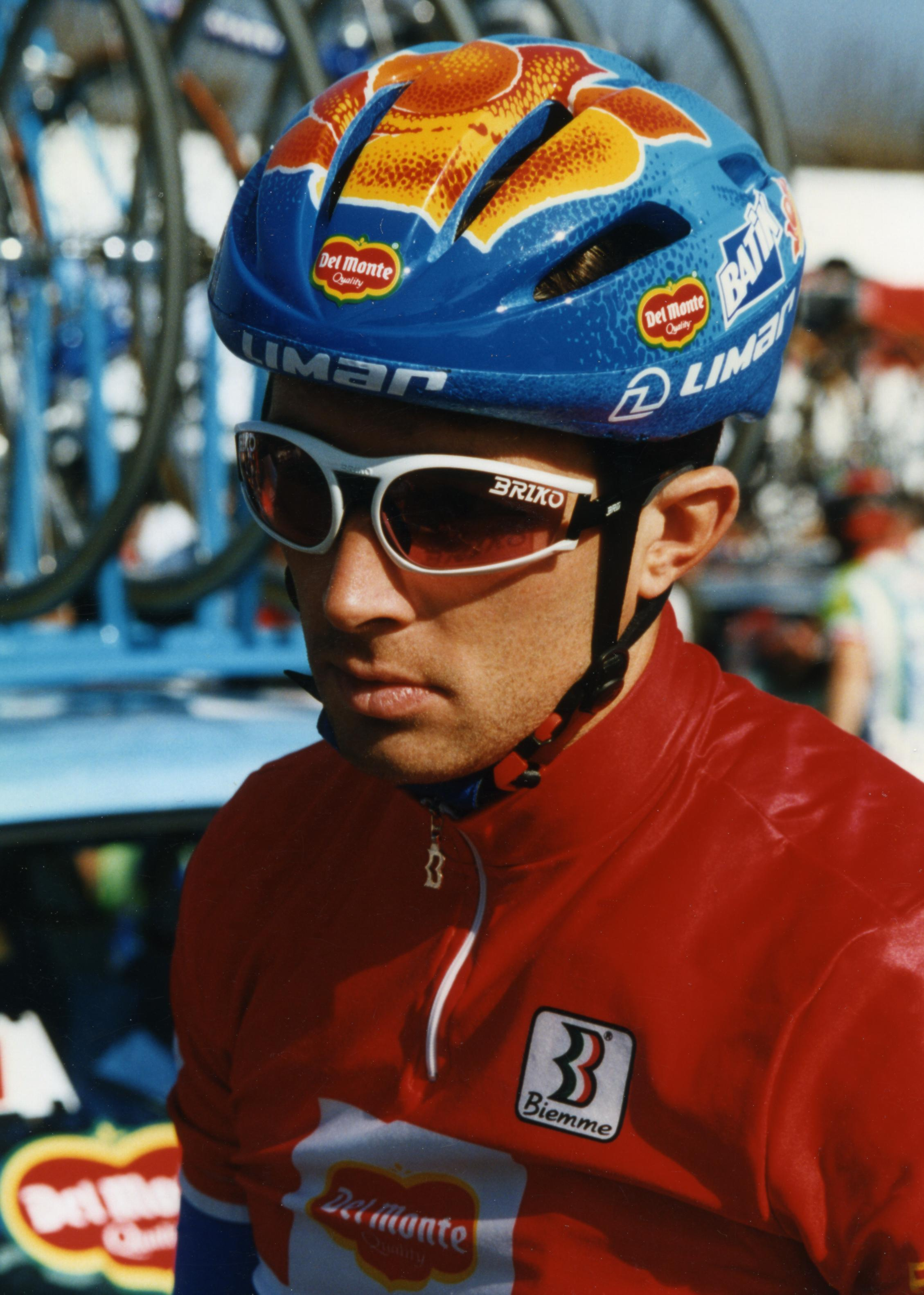

Personal information
- Born: 3 November 1969 (age 56) Rickenbach, Lucerne, Switzerland

Cycling career
- Sport: Cycling
- Current team: Retired
- Discipline: Road
- Role: Rider

Professional teams
- 1995: Cicli Ghia–Villiger
- 1996: PMU Romand–Bepsa
- 1997: Batik–Del Monte
- 1998: Festina–Lotus
- 1999–2001: Saeco–Cannondale

Armin Meier (born 3 November 1969) is a Swiss former cyclist. He was involved the Festina affair, and was part of the team that was disqualified from the 1998 Tour de France. Despite never testing positive for any drugs, he admitted to the use of EPO throughout his career. He was the Swiss National Road Race champion in 1996 and 1999. He also competed in the individual road race at the 1992 Summer Olympics.

== Major results ==
1989
1st Hegiberg-Rundfahrt
1992
2nd Road race, National Amateur Road Championships
1993
1st Tour du Canton de Genève
1994
1st Stausee-Rundfahrt Klingnau
1995
1st Prologue Tour de Normandie
1996
1st Road race, National Road Championships
1st Stage 3 Uniqa Classic
2nd Gran Premio di Lugano
7th Josef Voegeli Memorial
7th Overall Grand Prix Guillaume Tell
7th Overall Regio-Tour
9th Overall Tour de Suisse
10th Overall Tour de Normandie
1997
2nd Josef Voegeli Memorial
3rd Overall Grand Prix Guillaume Tell
6th GP de Fourmies
7th Overall Giro di Sardegna
1998
2nd Road race, National Road Championships
3rd Josef Voegeli Memorial
4th Overall Grand Prix Guillaume Tell
1999
1st Road race, National Road Championships
7th Overall Grand Prix du Midi Libre
2000
5th Josef Voegeli Memorial
2001
9th GP du canton d'Argovie

=== Grand Tour general classification results timeline ===
Grand Tour	1997	1998	1999	2000
Giro d'Italia	DNF	48	—	—
Tour de France	—	DSQ	31	DNF
Vuelta a España	—	—	DNF	104

Legend
DSQ	Disqualified
DNF	Did not finish
—	Did not compete
