= Alexandre Castellino =

Swiss cyclist

Personal information
- Born: 6 January 1881 Geneva, Switzerland

Cycling career
- Sport: Cycling
- Role: Rider

Alexandre Castellino (born 6 January 1881, date of death unknown) was a Swiss racing cyclist. He was the Swiss National Road Race champion in 1904.
