= Albert Blattmann =

Swiss cyclist (1904–1967)

Personal information
- Born: 8 September 1904 Zurich, Switzerland
- Died: 19 May 1967 (aged 62) Bern, Switzerland

Cycling career
- Sport: Cycling

Albert Blattmann (8 September 1904 – 19 May 1967) was a Swiss cyclist. He competed in two events at the 1924 Summer Olympics. He was also the Swiss National Road Race champion in 1928.
