= Daniel Schnider =

Swiss cyclist

Personal information
- Born: 20 November 1973 (age 52) Hasle, Lucerne, Switzerland

Cycling career
- Sport: Cycling
- Current team: Retired
- Discipline: Road
- Role: Rider

Professional teams
- 1996–1999: PMU Romand–Bepsa
- 2000–2001: Française des Jeux
- 2002–2006: Phonak

Daniel Schnider (born 20 November 1973) is a Swiss former professional road cyclist. He was the Swiss National Road Race champion in 2003.

== Major results ==
1996
3rd National Hill Climb Championships
1997
1st Melbourne to Warrnambool Classic
1998
2nd Overall Circuito Montañés
3rd Overall Tour du Vaucluse
6th Overall GP Tell
9th Japan Cup Cycle Road Race
10th Overall Tour de Normandie
1999
2nd Road race, National Road Championships
2nd Wartenberg Rundfahrt
3rd National Hill Climb Championships
2000
1st Overall À travers Lausanne

1st Stage 2a

1st National Hill Climb Championships
2001
2nd Overall Circuit de Lorraine

1st Stage 6

1st Six Days of Zurich (with Scott McGrory and Matthew Gilmore)
3rd Road race, National Road Championships
3rd GP Winterthur
4th GP du canton d'Argovie
7th Gran Premio di Lugano
10th Overall Tour de Suisse
2003
1st Road race, National Road Championships
3rd Overall Sachsen Tour
3rd Schynberg Rundfahrt
9th Overall Tour du Poitou Charentes
2004
8th Tour de Berne
2005
6th Overall Tour de Wallonie

=== Grand Tour general classification results timeline ===
| Grand Tour | 2000 | 2001 | 2002 | 2003 | 2004 | 2005 |
|---|---|---|---|---|---|---|
| Giro d'Italia | 91 | — | — | — | 44 | 76 |
| Tour de France | — | 66 | — | — | — | — |
| Vuelta a España | — | — | 68 | — | — | — |

Legend
| DSQ | Disqualified |
| DNF | Did not finish |
