= Marcel Strauss =

Swiss cyclist

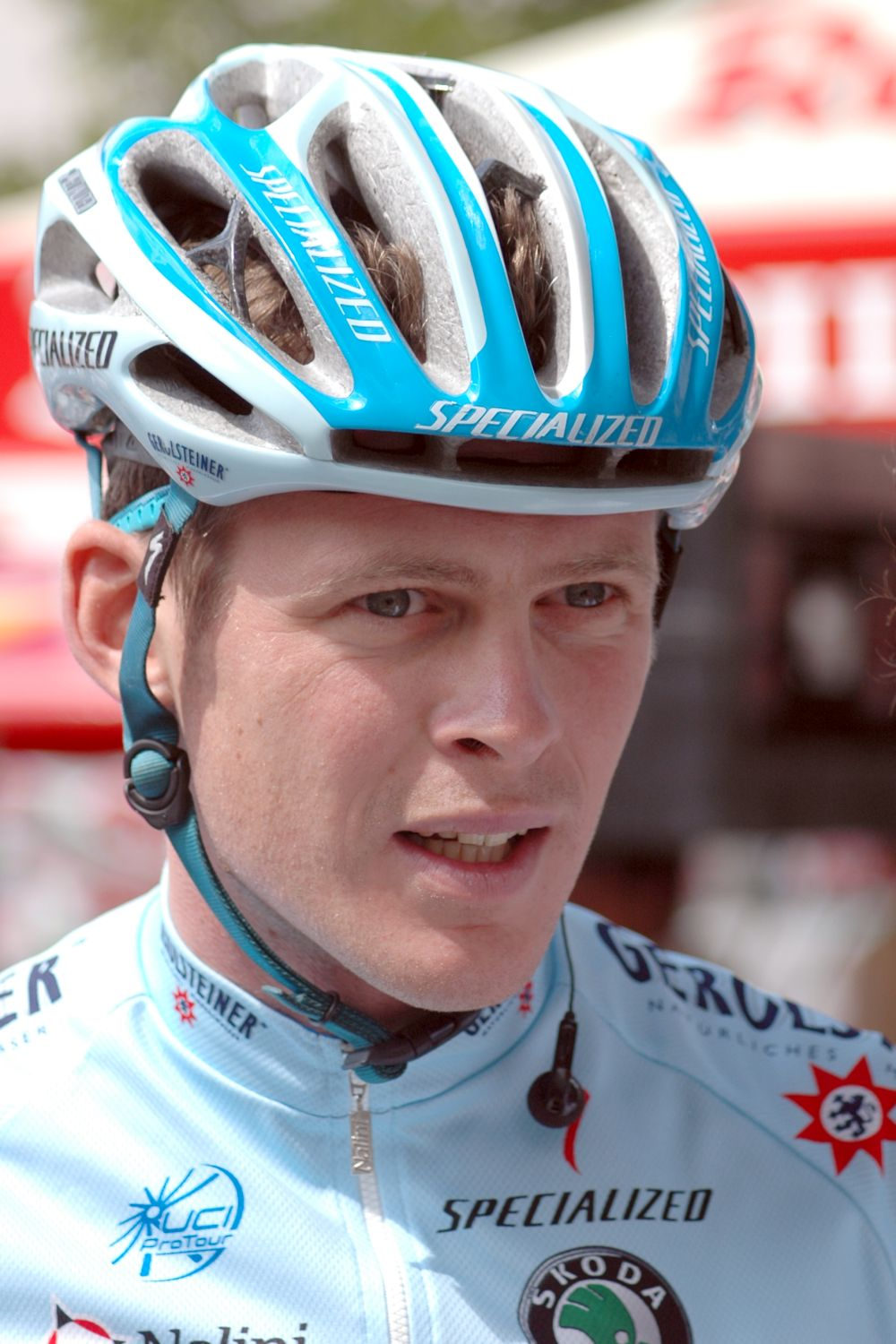

Personal information
- Full name: Marcel Strauss
- Born: 25 August 1976 (age 50) Feuerthalen, Switzerland
- Height: 1.80 m (5 ft 11 in)
- Weight: 69 kg (152 lb)

Cycling career
- Sport: Cycling
- Current team: Retired
- Discipline: Road
- Role: Rider

Professional teams
- 1999–2000: Post Swiss
- 2001–2008: Gerolsteiner

Marcel Strauss (born 25 August 1976 in Feuerthalen) is a Swiss former professional road bicycle racer, last riding for UCI ProTeam Gerolsteiner. He retired in 2008, when that team folded.

== Palmares ==
- 2nd, National Road Race Championship (2000–2006)
  - 3rd (2005)
- Ster Elektrotoer - 1 stage (2002)
- Giro della Svizzera Meridionale - Overall (2000)
- 2nd, National U19 Road Race Championship (1993–1994)
