= Ernst Fuchs (cyclist) =

Swiss cyclist (1936–1994)

Personal information
- Born: 27 December 1936 Altenrhein, Switzerland
- Died: 15 September 1994 (aged 57)

Cycling career
- Sport: Cycling
- Role: Rider

Ernst Fuchs (27 December 1936 – 15 September 1994) was a Swiss racing cyclist. He was the Swiss National Road Race champion in 1961.
