= Andreas Dietziker =

Swiss cyclist

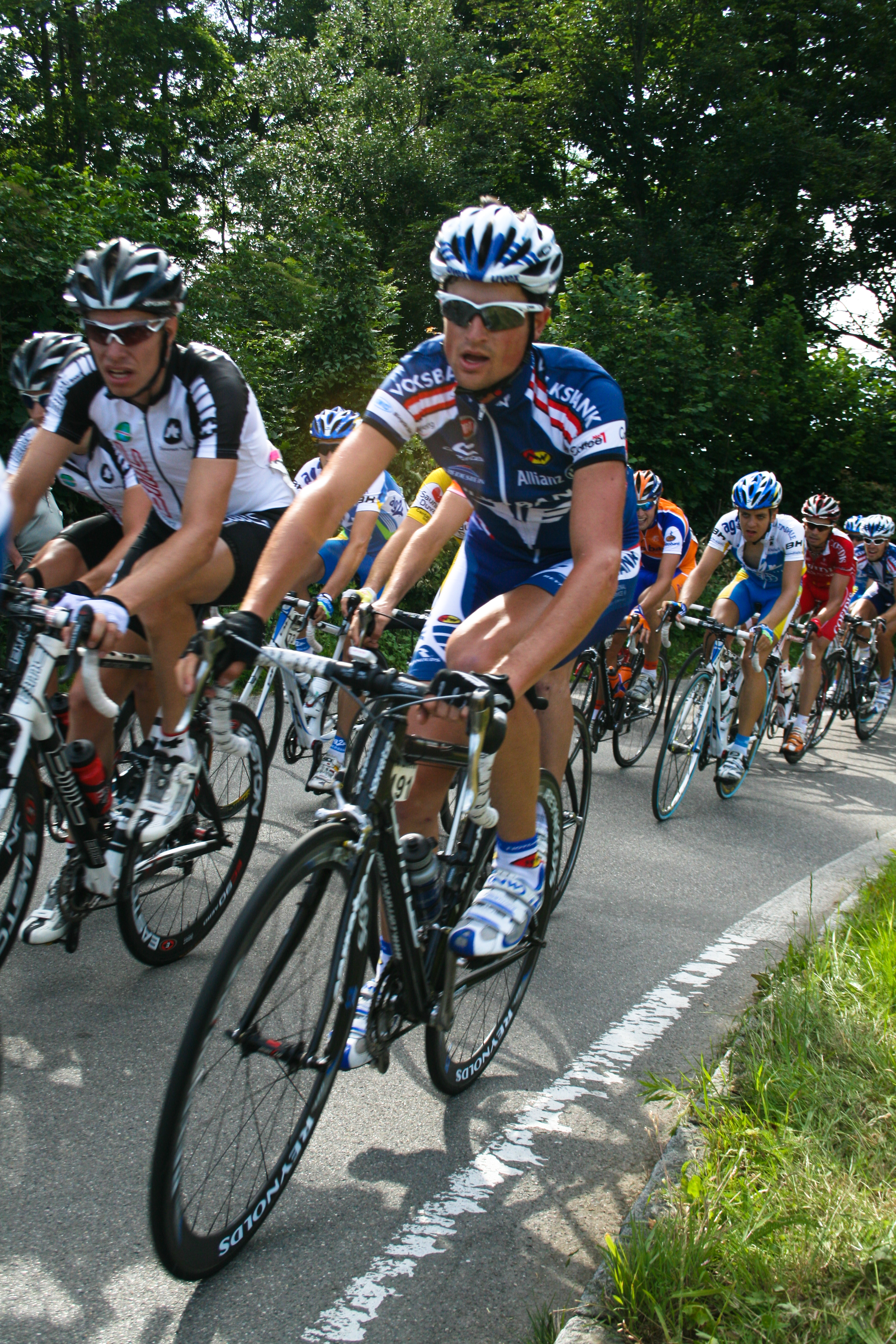
- Dietziker at the 2008 Tour de Suisse

Personal information
- Full name: Andreas Dietziker
- Born: 15 October 1982 (age 44) Goldingen, Switzerland

Cycling career
- Sport: Cycling
- Current team: Retired
- Discipline: Road
- Role: Rider

Professional teams
- 2005: Ed' System ZVVZ
- 2006–2007: Team LPR
- 2008–2010: Team Volksbank
- 2011–2012: Team NetApp

Andreas Dietziker (born 15 October 1982) is a Swiss former cyclist. He rode in the 2012 Giro d'Italia.

== Major results ==
2003
1st Overall Tour de Berlin

1st Stage 2

2004
1st Time trial, National Under-23 Road Championships
2nd Giro del Canavese
2007
1st Giro del Mendrisiotto
1st Stage 5 Rheinland-Pfalz Rundfahrt
2008
2nd Bayern-Rundfahrt
3rd Time trial, National Road Championships
2010
1st Giro del Mendrisiotto
2012
1st Stage 2b (TTT) Settimana internazionale di Coppi e Bartali
