= Ernst Näf =

Swiss cyclist

Ernest Näf
Personal information
- Born: 2 May 1920 Stafa, Switzerland

Cycling career
- Sport: Cycling
- Role: Rider

Ernest Näf (born 2 May 1920) was a Swiss racing cyclist. He was the Swiss National Road Race champion in 1944.
