= Daniel Huwyler =

Swiss cyclist

Personal information
- Born: 1 February 1963 (age 63) Sulz, Aargau, Switzerland

Cycling career
- Sport: Cycling

Daniel Huwyler (born 1 February 1963) is a Swiss former cyclist. He competed in the team pursuit event at the 1984 Summer Olympics.
