= Iwan Schmid =

Swiss cyclist

Personal information
- Born: 15 November 1947 Oberbuchsiten, Switzerland
- Died: 19 May 2009 (aged 61) Wangen bei Olten, Switzerland

Cycling career
- Sport: Cycling

Iwan Schmid (15 November 1947 – 13 May 2009) was a Swiss cyclist. He competed in the individual road race at the 1972 Summer Olympics.
