= Barbara Ganz =

Swiss cyclist

Personal information
- Born: 28 July 1964 (age 62) Schlatt, Switzerland

Cycling career
- Sport: Cycling
- Role: Rider

Barbara Ganz (born 28 July 1964) is a Swiss former racing cyclist. She was the Swiss National Road Race champion in 1993. She also competed in the women's road race at the 1988 Summer Olympics.
