= Evelyne Müller =

Swiss cyclist

Personal information
- Born: 29 December 1962 (age 63)

Cycling career
- Sport: Cycling
- Role: Rider

Evelyne Müller (born 29 December 1962) is a Swiss former racing cyclist. She was the Swiss National Road Race champion in 1983.
