= Roland Schär =

Swiss cyclist

Personal information
- Born: 1 July 1950 (age 76) Muhlefeld, Switzerland

Cycling career
- Sport: Cycling

Roland Schär (born 1 July 1950) is a former Swiss cyclist. He competed in the team time trial at the 1972 Summer Olympics.
