= Gilbert Glaus =

Swiss cyclist

Personal information
- Full name: Gilbert Glaus
- Born: 3 December 1955 (age 70) Thun, Canton of Bern, Switzerland

Cycling career
- Sport: Cycling
- Current team: Retired
- Discipline: Road
- Role: Rider
- Rider type: Sprinter

Professional teams
- 1982–1985: Cilo – Aufina
- 1986: Peugeot – Shell – Velo Talbot
- 1987: Vétements Z–Peugeot
- 1988–1989: Pegasus
- 1989: Bleiker – Mondia
- 1990–1992: Pegasus
Medal record
Men's road bicycle racing
Representing Switzerland
World Championships
Gold medal – first place	1978 Nürburg	Amateur's Road Race
Bronze medal – third place	1981 Prague	Amateur's Road Race

Gilbert Glaus (born 3 December 1955) is a retired Swiss professional road bicycle racer. In 1978, Glaus became amateur world champion, and he became a professional cyclist in 1982. In 1983, Glaus won a stage in the 1983 Tour de France, but in the 1984 Tour de France he was the Lanterne rouge (the last finishing cyclist). He was the Swiss National Road Race champion in 1982. He also competed in the individual road race and team time trial events at the 1980 Summer Olympics.

== Major results ==
1977
Giro del Mendrisiotto
GP Tell
1978
World Amateur Road Race Championship
1979
Stausee-Rundfahrt Klingnau
1980
Giro del Mendrisiotto
1981
Giro del Mendrisiotto
Stausee-Rundfahrt Klingnau
1982
Switzerland National Road Race Championship
Montauroux
1983
GP de Cannes
Hegiberg-Rundfahrt
Tour de France:

Winner stage 22

1985
Aarwangen
Meyrin
1986
GP de Cannes
Bordeaux–Paris
1987
Antibes
Meyrin
Trofeo Laigueglia
1989
Stausee-Rundfahrt Klingnau
1992
Stausee-Rundfahrt Klingnau
