= Hans Martin (cyclist) =

Swiss cyclist

Personal information
- Born: 29 April 1913
- Died: 30 May 2005 (aged 92)

Cycling career
- Sport: Cycling
- Discipline: Road
- Role: Rider

Hans Martin (29 April 1913 – 30 May 2005) was a Swiss racing cyclist. He rode in the 1936 Tour de France.
