= Luzia Zberg =

Swiss racing cyclist

Personal information
- Full name: Luzia Zberg
- Born: 18 January 1970 (age 56) Altdorf, Uri, Switzerland
- Height: 1.61 m (5 ft 3 1/2 in)
- Weight: 49 kg (108 lb)

Cycling career
- Sport: Cycling
- Current team: retired

Major wins
- (Switzerland) National Road Race Champion (1991, 1992, 1993, 1994) (Switzerland) National Time Trial Champion (1994, 1995)

Luzia Zberg (born 18 January 1970 in Altdorf, Uri) is a retired racing cyclist from Switzerland. She represented her native country at the 1992 Summer Olympics in Barcelona, Spain, where she finished in 8th place in the women's individual road race. Her biggest achievements are winning four national titles in the women's road race (1991, 1992, 1993, and 1994), as well as two in the women's individual time trial (1994 and 1995).
