= Yvonne Schnorf =

Swiss cyclist (born 1965)

Yvonne Schnorf-Wabel
Personal information
- Born: 28 July 1965 (age 61) Männedorf, Switzerland

Cycling career
- Sport: Cycling
- Discipline: Road cycling

Professional team
- 1991: GS Edco-Lehmann-Atzmännig

Yvonne Schnorf-Wabel (born 28 July 1965) is a road cyclist from Switzerland. She represented her nation at the 1996 Summer Olympics and 2000 Summer Olympics.
