= Fritz Zbinden =

Swiss cyclist

Personal information
- Full name: Fritz Zbinden
- Born: 28 July 1922 Saint-Sulpice, Vaud, Switzerland
- Died: 15 June 1983 (aged 60) Basel, Switzerland

Cycling career
- Sport: Cycling
- Role: Rider

Fritz Zbinden (28 July 1922 – 15 June 1983) was a Swiss racing cyclist. He finished in last place in the 1950 Tour de France.
