= Remo Pianezzi =

Swiss cyclist

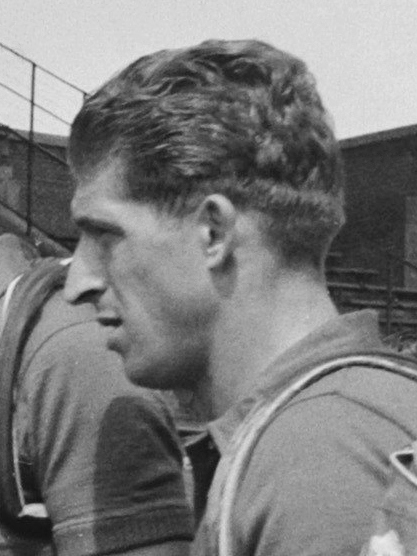
- Remo Pianezzi in 1954

Personal information
- Born: 27 February 1927
- Died: 8 January 2015 (aged 87)

Cycling career
- Sport: Cycling
- Role: Rider

Remo Pianezzi (27 February 1927 – 8 January 2015) was a Swiss professional racing cyclist. He rode in three editions of the Tour de France.
