= Atlas Personal–Jakroo =

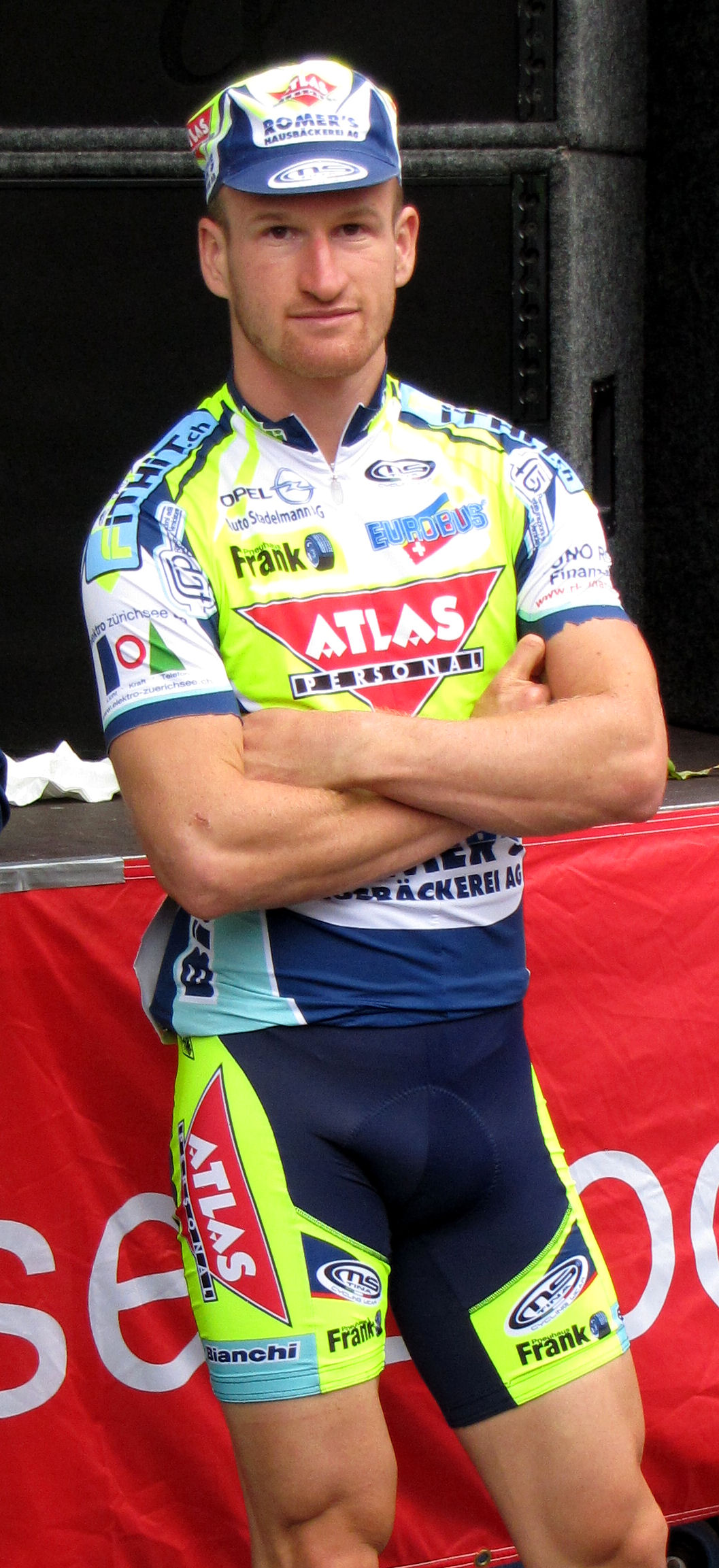
- Maxime Beney

Team information
- UCI code: ARH
- Registered: Switzerland
- Founded: 2007
- Disbanded: 2013
- Discipline: Road
- Status: UCI Continental
- Bicycles: Fondriest

Key personnel
- General manager: Ueli Schumacher
- Team managers: Roland Gloor, Peter Bernet, Gustav Mosimann

Team name history
- 2007–2009 2010 2011 2012–2013: Atlas–Romer's Hausbäckerei; Atlas Personal–BMC; Atlas Personal; Atlas Personal–Jakroo

Atlas Personal–Jakroo was a Swiss UCI Continental cycling team that was founded in 2007 and disbanded in 2013.

The team was based in Germany for the 2007 season, but moved to Switzerland in 2008.
