= Switzerland at the 1992 Summer Olympics =

- IOC code: SUI
- NOC: Swiss Olympic Association

in Barcelona
- Competitors: 102 (73 men, 29 women) in 17 sports
- Flag bearer: Daniel Giubellini
- Medals Ranked 37th: Gold 1 Silver 0 Bronze 0 Total 1

Summer Olympics appearances (overview)
- 1896; 1900; 1904; 1908; 1912; 1920; 1924; 1928; 1932; 1936; 1948; 1952; 1956; 1960; 1964; 1968; 1972; 1976; 1980; 1984; 1988; 1992; 1996; 2000; 2004; 2008; 2012; 2016; 2020; 2024

Other related appearances
- 1906 Intercalated Games

Switzerland competed at the 1992 Summer Olympics in Barcelona, Spain. 102 competitors, 73 men and 29 women, took part in 80 events in 17 sports.

== Medalists ==
Medal	Name	Sport	Event	Date
Gold	Marc Rosset	Tennis	Men's singles	8 August

== Competitors ==
The following is the list of number of competitors in the Games.

Sport	Men	Women	Total
Athletics	8	7	15
Badminton	0	2	2
Canoeing	5	1	6
Cycling	10	3	13
Diving	0	2	2
Equestrian	4	3	7
Fencing	3	0	3
Gymnastics	6	0	6
Judo	4	1	5
Modern pentathlon	1	–	1
Rowing	9	0	9
Sailing	9	1	10
Shooting	6	2	8
Swimming	2	2	4
Synchronized swimming	–	3	3
Tennis	2	2	4
Wrestling	4	–	4
Total	73	29	102

== Athletics ==
Men's Marathon

- Daniel Boltz — 2:25.50 (→ 55th place)

Men's 50 km Walk

- Pascal Charriere — 4:08:32 (→ 20th place)
- Aldo Bertoldi — did not finish (→ no ranking)

Men's Discus Throw

- Christian Erb

- Qualification — 55.16 m (→ did not advance)

Men's Shot Put

- Werner Günthör

- Qualification — 20.50 m
- Final — 20.91 m (→ 4th place)

Women's Marathon

- Franziska Moser

- Qualification — did not finish (→ no ranking)

Women's High Jump

- Sieglind Cadush

- Qualification — 1.86 m (→ did not advance)

== Cycling ==
Thirteen cyclists, ten men and three women, represented Switzerland in 1992.

Men's road race

- Urs Güller
- Roland Meier
- Armin Meier

Men's team time trial

- Thomas Boutellier
- Roland Meier
- Beat Meister
- Theodor Rinderknecht

Men's sprint

- Rolf Furrer

Men's 1 km time trial

- Rocco Travella

Men's individual pursuit

- Viktor Kunz

Men's points race

- Andreas Aeschbach

Women's road race

- Luzia Zberg — 2:05:03 (→ 8th place)
- Petra Walczewski — 2:05:03 (→ 22nd place)
- Barbara Heeb — 2:09:42 (→ 43rd place)

== Diving ==
Women's 3m Springboard

- Catherine Aviolat

- Preliminary Round — 239.49 points (→ did not advance, 27th place)

Women's 10m Platform

- Yvonne Kostenberger

- Preliminary Round — 264.81 points (→ did not advance, 22nd place)

== Fencing ==
Three male fencers represented Switzerland in 1992.

Men's épée

- Olivier Jacquet
- André Kuhn
- Daniel Lang

== Modern pentathlon ==
One male pentathlete represented Switzerland in 1992.

Individual

- Peter Steinmann

== Swimming ==
Men's 50m Freestyle

- Dano Halsall
  1. Heat – 23.15
  2. B-Final – 23.18 (→ 16th place)
- Stéphane Volery
  1. Heat – 23.47 (→ did not advance, 25th place)

Men's 100m Freestyle

- Stéphane Volery
  1. Heat – 51.05 (→ did not advance, 23rd place)

Women's 50m Freestyle

- Eva Gysling
  1. Heat – 27.21 (→ did not advance, 33rd place)

Women's 100m Backstroke

- Eva Gysling
  1. Heat – 1:04.50 (→ did not advance, 21st place)
- Nathalie Wunderlich
  1. Heat – 1:05.75 (→ did not advance, 32nd place)

Women's 200m Backstroke

- Nathalie Wunderlich
  1. Heat – 2:16.07
  2. B-Final – 2:19.70 (→ 16th place)

Women's 200m Individual Medley

- Nathalie Wunderlich
  1. Heat – 2:23.18 (→ did not advance, 29th place)

== Synchronized swimming ==
Three synchronized swimmers represented Switzerland in 1992.

Women's solo

- Claudia Peczinka
- Caroline Imoberdorf
- Rahel Hobi

Women's duet

- Claudia Peczinka
- Caroline Imoberdorf

== Tennis ==
Men

Athlete	Event	Round of 64	Round of 32	Round of 16	Quarterfinals	Semifinals	Medal Match	
Athlete	Event	Opposition Score	Opposition Score	Opposition Score	Opposition Score	Opposition Score	Opposition Score	Rank
Marc Rosset	Singles	K Alami (MAR); W 6–2, 4–6, 2–1 r.	W Ferreira (RSA); W 6–4, 6–0, 6–2	J Courier (USA); W 6–4, 6–2, 6–1	E Sánchez (ESP); W 6–4, 7–6(2), 3–6, 7–6(9)	G Ivanišević (CRO); W 6–3, 7–5, 6–2	J Arrese (ESP); W 7–6, 6–4, 3–6, 4–6, 8–6	Gold medal
Jakob Hlasek	Singles	F Maciel (MEX); W 6–3, 6–4, 4–6, 6–2	A Sznajder (CAN); W 4–6, 6–4, 6–3, 7–6(1)	G Ivanišević (CRO); L 6–3, 0–6, 6–4, 6–7(1), 7–9	did not advance			
Jakob Hlasek; Marc Rosset	Doubles		Q Meng (CHN); J Xia (CHN); W 7–5, 6–1, 6–2	O Casey (IRL); E Collins (IRL); W 7–6(4), 6–3, 6–4	J Frana (ARG); C Miniussi (ARG); L 6–2, 6–7(3), 6–3, 2–6, 2–6	did not advance		

Women

Athlete	Event	Round of 64	Round of 32	Round of 16	Quarterfinals	Semifinals	Medal Match	
Athlete	Event	Opposition Score	Opposition Score	Opposition Score	Opposition Score	Opposition Score	Opposition Score	Rank
Emanuela Zardo	Singles	M Maleeva (BUL); L 2–6, 4–6	did not advance					
Manuela Maleeva-Fragniere	Singles	A Vieira (BRA); W 6–2, 6–3	R Reggi-Concato (ITA); W 4–6, 4–6	A Gavaldón (MEX); W 6–0, 6–3	M J Fernandez (USA); L 7–5, 1–6, 0–6	did not advance		
Manuela Maleeva-Fragniere; Emanuela Zardo	Doubles		D Randriantefy (MAD); N Randriantefy (MAD); W 6–2, 6–2	C Martínez (ESP); A Sánchez Vicario (ESP); L 0–6, 1–6	did not advance			
