= Cycling at the 1992 Summer Olympics – Men's team time trial =

Men's team time trial at the Games of the XXV Olympiad
- Venue: Circuit de Catalunya and roads
- Date: 26 July
- Competitors: 124 from 31 nations

Medalists
1st place, gold medalist(s)		Bernd Dittert; Christian Meyer; Uwe Peschel; Michael Rich; Germany
2nd place, silver medalist(s)		Flavio Anastasia; Luca Colombo; Gianfranco Contri; Andrea Peron; Italy
3rd place, bronze medalist(s)		Hervé Boussard; Didier Faivre-Pierret; Philippe Gaumont, Jean-Louis Harel; France

The men's team time trial event was part of the road cycling programme at the 1992 Summer Olympics. The time for the team was stopped after the third person on the team crossed the finish line. This event was discontinued after this Olympics. The race was contested over 102.8 km (63.9 mi)

== Results ==
Place	Cyclists	Team	Time
1st place, gold medalist(s)	Bernd Dittert; Christian Meyer; Uwe Peschel; Michael Rich	Germany	2:01:39
2nd place, silver medalist(s)	Flavio Anastasia; Luca Colombo; Gianfranco Contri; Andrea Peron	Italy	2:02:39
3rd place, bronze medalist(s)	Hervé Boussard; Didier Faivre-Pierret; Philippe Gaumont, Jean-Louis Harel	France	2:05:25
4	Igor Dzyuba; Oleh Halkin; Igor Pastukhovich; Igor Patenko	Unified Team	2:05:34
5	Miguel Fernández; Álvaro González de Galdeano; Eleuterio Mancebo; David Plaza	Spain	2:06:11
6	Grzegorz Piwowarski; Andrzej Sypytkowski; Dariusz Baranowski; Marek Leśniewski	Poland	2:06:34
7	Thomas Boutellier; Roland Meier; Beat Meister; Theodor Rinderknecht	Switzerland	2:06:35
8	Jaroslav Bílek; Miroslav Lipták; Pavel Padrnos; František Trkal	Czechoslovakia	2:06:44
9	John den Braber; Pelle Kil; Bart Voskamp; Jaap ten Kortenaar	Netherlands	2:07:49
10	Brian Fowler; Paul Leitch; Graeme Miller; Chris Nicholson	New Zealand	2:08:10
11	Stig Kristiansen; Roar Skaane; Bjørn Stenersen; Karsten Stenersen	Norway	2:08:25
12	Robert Crowe; Darren Lawson; Robert McLachlan; Grant Rice	Australia	2:09:12
13	Colin Davidson; Chris Koberstein; Todd McNutt; Yvan Waddell	Canada	2:10:33
14	Gary Dighton; Stephen Farrell; Matt Illingworth; Peter Longbottom	Great Britain	2:12:14
15	Li Wenkai; Wang Shusen; Zhu Zhengjun; Tang Xuezhong	China	2:12:38
16	George Hincapie; Nathan Sheafor; Scott Mercier; John Stenner	United States	2:13:35
17	Mark Kane; Kevin Kimmage; Robert Power; Paul Slane	Ireland	2:14:32
18	Mićo Brković; Aleksandar Milenković; Mikoš Rnjaković; Dušan Popeskov	Independent Olympic Participants	2:14:37
19	Zundui Naran; Dashnyamyn Tömör-Ochir; Jamsran Ulzii-Orshikh; Dashjamtsyn Mönkhbat	Mongolia	2:16:52
20	Hernandes Quadri; Fernando Louro; Euripides Ferreira; Márcio May	Brazil	2:22:00
21	Nima Ebrahim; Hussain Eslami; Khosrow Ghamari; Hossein Mahmoudi	Iran	2:24:44
22	Mamdooh Al-Doseri; Saber Mohamed Hasan; Jameel Kadhem; Jamal Ahmed Al-Doseri	Bahrain	2:26:00
23	Ali Al-Abed; Mansoor Bu Osaiba; Khamis Harib; Khalifa Bin Omair	United Arab Emirates	2:27:41
24	Alfred Ebanks; Don Campbell; Craig Merren; Stefan Baraud	Cayman Islands	2:33:30
25	Wil Yamamoto; Jazy Garcia; Manuel García; Martin Santos	Guam	2:34:41
26	Medhadi Al-Dosari; Saleh Al-Qobaissi; Mohamed Al-Takroni	Saudi Arabia	2:35:30
27	Orlando Chavarria; Douglas Lamb; Michael Lewis; Ernest Meighan	Belize	2:42:38
28	Biruk Abebe; Hailu Fana; Asmelash Geyesus; Danial Fesshaye	Ethiopia	2:45:43
29	Rufin Molomadan; Vincent Gomgadja; Obed Ngaite; Christ Yarafa	Central African Republic	2:49:28
-	Michael Andersson; Björn Johansson; Jan Karlsson; Johan Fagrell	Sweden	DNF
-	Mobance Amisi; Selenge Kimoto; Niampala Mongay; Ndjibu N'Golomingi	Zaire	DNS

== Notes ==
DNF – did not finish
DNS – did not start
