= Cycling at the 1992 Summer Olympics – Men's individual road race =

Men's road race at the Games of the XXV Olympiad
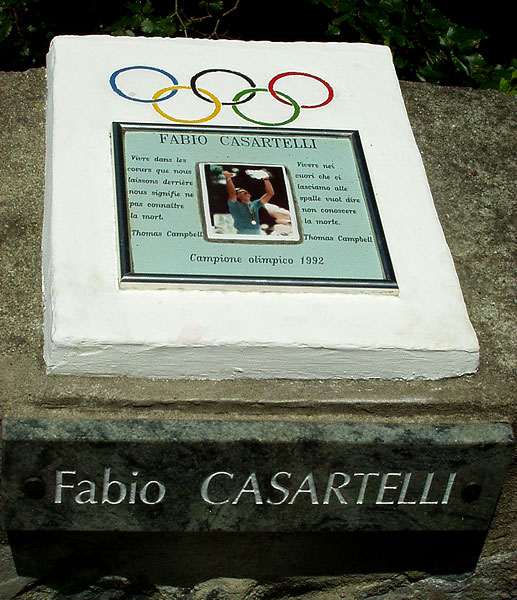
- A plaque on Col de Portet d'Aspet where Fabio Casartelli died
- Venue: Sant Sadurní d'Anoia, Barcelona
- Date: 2 August
- Competitors: 154 from 61 nations
- Winning time: 4:35:21

Medalists
1st place, gold medalist(s)		Fabio Casartelli; Italy
2nd place, silver medalist(s)		Erik Dekker; Netherlands
3rd place, bronze medalist(s)		Dainis Ozols; Latvia

The men's individual road race was an event at the 1992 Summer Olympics in Barcelona, Spain. There were 154 participants from 61 nations, with 84 cyclists completing the race. The maximum number of cyclists per nation was three. The event was won by Fabio Casartelli of Italy, the nation's first victory in the men's individual road race since 1968 and fourth overall (two more than any other nation). Erik Dekker's silver was the first medal for the Netherlands in the event since 1972. Dainis Ozols gave Latvia its first medal in the event in the country's first independent appearance since 1936.

== Background ==
The race was the 14th event, after the interruption between 1896 and the summer of 1936. It replaced the individual time trial event that had been held from 1912 to 1932 (and which would be reintroduced alongside the road race in 1996). A young triathlete from the United States named Lance Armstrong was among the favorites, along with Erik Dekker of the Netherlands.

Antigua and Barbuda, Aruba, Bahrain, Benin, the Central African Republic, Estonia, Guam, Lithuania, Rwanda, Slovenia, and the Virgin Islands each made their debut in the men's individual road race; some former Soviet republics competed as the Unified Team and some Yugoslav cyclists competed as Independent Olympic Participants. Great Britain made its 14th appearance in the event, the only nation to have competed in each appearance to date.

== Competition format and course ==
The mass-start race was on a 194.4 kilometre course over the Sant Sadurni Cycling Circuit.

== Schedule ==
All times are Central European Summer Time (UTC+2)

Date	Time	Round
Sunday, 2 August 1992	8:30	Final

== Results ==
During the penultimate lap, Casartelli, Dekker, and Ozols managed to break away from the lead pack; they maintained separation and finished in the medals with Casartelli winning the final sprint.

Rank	Cyclist	Nation	Time
1st place, gold medalist(s)	Fabio Casartelli	Italy	4:35:21
2nd place, silver medalist(s)	Erik Dekker	Netherlands	4:35:22
3rd place, bronze medalist(s)	Dainis Ozols	Latvia	4:35:24
4	Erik Zabel	Germany	4:35:56
5	Lauri Aus	Estonia	s.t.
6	Andrzej Sypytkowski	Poland	s.t.
7	Sylvain Bolay	France	s.t.
8	Arvis Piziks	Latvia	s.t.
9	Raido Kodanipork	Estonia	s.t.
10	Grant Rice	Australia	s.t.
11	Lars Michaelsen	Denmark	s.t.
12	Michel Lafis	Sweden	s.t.
13	Urs Güller	Switzerland	s.t.
14	Lance Armstrong	United States	s.t.
15	Ángel Edo	Spain	s.t.
16	Darren Smith	Australia	s.t.
17	Richard Groenendaal	Netherlands	s.t.
18	Christian Andersen	Denmark	s.t.
19	Roland Meier	Switzerland	s.t.
20	Davide Rebellin	Italy	s.t.
21	Tomokazu Fujino	Japan	s.t.
22	Jacek Mickiewicz	Poland	s.t.
23	Saulius Šarkauskas	Lithuania	s.t.
24	Kiko García	Spain	s.t.
25	František Trkal	Czechoslovakia	s.t.
26	Gianni Vignaduzzi	Canada	s.t.
27	Miloslav Kejval	Czechoslovakia	s.t.
28	Wanderley Magalhães Azevedo	Brazil	s.t.
29	Peter Luttenberger	Austria	s.t.
30	Steffen Wesemann	Germany	s.t.
31	Xavier Pérez	Andorra	s.t.
32	Kevin Kimmage	Ireland	s.t.
33	Svyatoslav Ryabushenko	Unified Team	s.t.
34	Claus Michael Møller	Denmark	s.t.
35	Conor Henry	Ireland	s.t.
36	Simeon Hempsall	Great Britain	s.t.
37	Timm Peddie	United States	s.t.
38	Bjørn Stenersen	Norway	s.t.
39	Tang Xuezhong	China	s.t.
40	Carlos Maya	Venezuela	s.t.
41	Nathael Sagard	Canada	s.t.
42	Aleksandar Milenković	Independent Olympic Participants	s.t.
43	Juan Carlos Rosero	Ecuador	s.t.
44	Zhu Zhengjun	China	s.t.
45	Lars Kristian Johnsen	Norway	s.t.
46	Hussein Monsalve	Venezuela	s.t.
47	Petro Koshelenko	Unified Team	s.t.
48	Pascal Hervé	France	s.t.
49	José Robles	Colombia	s.t.
50	Federico Moreira	Uruguay	s.t.
51	Graeme Miller	New Zealand	s.t.
52	Héctor Palacio	Colombia	s.t.
53	Arnolds Ūdris	Latvia	s.t.
54	Andreas Langl	Austria	s.t.
55	Zbigniew Piątek	Poland	s.t.
56	Georg Totschnig	Austria	s.t.
57	Karsten Stenersen	Norway	s.t.
58	Csaba Steig	Hungary	s.t.
59	Brian Fowler	New Zealand	s.t.
60	David Cook	Great Britain	s.t.
61	Matthew Stephens	Great Britain	s.t.
62	Jacques Landry	Canada	s.t.
63	Valter Bonča	Slovenia	s.t.
64	Wang Shusen	China	s.t.
65	Paul Slane	Ireland	s.t.
66	Aleksey Bochkov	Unified Team	s.t.
67	Michael Andersson	Sweden	s.t.
68	Christian Meyer	Germany	s.t.
69	Pavel Padrnos	Czechoslovakia	s.t.
70	Armin Meier	Switzerland	s.t.
71	Mirco Gualdi	Italy	s.t.
72	Rob Compas	Netherlands	4:36:33
73	Tom Bamford	New Zealand	4:36:41
74	Sergio Tesitore	Uruguay	4:36:52
75	Bob Mionske	United States	4:42:31
76	Libardo Niño	Colombia	4:44:05
77	Glenn Magnusson	Sweden	4:44:32
78	Radiša Čubrić	Independent Olympic Participants	4:45:14
79	Jamsran Ulzii-Orshikh	Mongolia	s.t.
80	Károly Eisenkrammer	Hungary	4:52:07
81	Scott Richardson	South Africa	4:58:25
82	Emili Pérez	Andorra	s.t.
83	Dashjamtsyn Mönkhbat	Mongolia	5:02:11
84	Kozo Fujita	Japan	s.t.
—	Juan González	Andorra	DNF
—	Neil Lloyd	Antigua and Barbuda	DNF
—	Robert Marsh	Antigua and Barbuda	DNF
—	Robert Peters	Antigua and Barbuda	DNF
—	Lucien Dirksz	Aruba	DNF
—	Gerard van Vliet	Aruba	DNF
—	Patrick Jonker	Australia	DNF
—	Jamal Ahmed Al-Doseri	Bahrain	DNF
—	Jameel Kadhem	Bahrain	DNF
—	Saber Mohamed Hasan	Bahrain	DNF
—	Erwin Thijs	Belgium	DNF
—	Michel Vanhaecke	Belgium	DNF
—	Wim Omloop	Belgium	DNF
—	Michael Lewis	Belize	DNF
—	Douglas Lamb	Belize	DNF
—	Ernest Meighan	Belize	DNF
—	Cossi Houegban	Benin	DNF
—	Fernand Gandaho	Benin	DNF
—	Hernandes Quadri	Brazil	DNF
—	Tonny Azevedo	Brazil	DNF
—	Stefan Baraud	Cayman Islands	DNF
—	Michele Smith	Cayman Islands	DNF
—	Dennis Brooks	Cayman Islands	DNF
—	Christ Yarafa	Central African Republic	DNF
—	Obed Ngaite	Central African Republic	DNF
—	Vincent Gomgadja	Central African Republic	DNF
—	Miguel Droguett	Chile	DNF
—	Weng Yu-yi	Chinese Taipei	DNF
—	Ndjibu N'Golomingi	Zaire	DNF
—	Mobange Amisi	Zaire	DNF
—	Selenge Kimoto	Zaire	DNF
—	Biruk Abebe	Ethiopia	DNF
—	Asmelash Geyesus	Ethiopia	DNF
—	Tekle Hailemikael	Ethiopia	DNF
—	Emmanuel Magnien	France	DNF
—	Thomas Ward	Great Britain	DNF
—	Manuel García	Guam	DNF
—	Martin Santos	Guam	DNF
—	Aubrey Richmond	Guyana	DNF
—	Mikoš Rnjaković	Independent Olympic Participants	DNF
—	Hussain Eslami	Iran	DNF
—	Khosrow Ghamari	Iran	DNF
—	Hossein Mahmoudi	Iran	DNF
—	Arthur Tenn	Jamaica	DNF
—	Michael McKay	Jamaica	DNF
—	Mitsuteru Tanaka	Japan	DNF
—	Armen Arslanian	Lebanon	DNF
—	Vatche Zadourian	Lebanon	DNF
—	Murugayan Kumaresan	Malaysia	DNF
—	Dashnyamyn Tömör-Ochir	Mongolia	DNF
—	Norberto Oconer	Philippines	DNF
—	Domingo Villanueva	Philippines	DNF
—	Faustin Mparabanyi	Rwanda	DNF
—	Emmanuel Nkurunziza	Rwanda	DNF
—	Alphonse Nshimiyiama	Rwanda	DNF
—	Guido Frisoni	San Marino	DNF
—	Medhadi Al-Dosari	Saudi Arabia	DNF
—	Saleh Al-Qobaissi	Saudi Arabia	DNF
—	Mohamed Al-Takroni	Saudi Arabia	DNF
—	Eleuterio Mancebo	Spain	DNF
—	Malcolm Lange	South Africa	DNF
—	Wayne Burgess	South Africa	DNF
—	Realdo Jessurun	Suriname	DNF
—	Koku Ahiaku	Togo	DNF
—	Komi Moreira	Togo	DNF
—	Khalifa Bin Omair	United Arab Emirates	DNF
—	Ali Al-Abed	United Arab Emirates	DNF
—	Mansoor Bu Osaiba	United Arab Emirates	DNF
—	Robinson Merchán	Venezuela	DNF
—	Chesen Frey	Virgin Islands	DNF
