= Dziuba =

Dziuba or Dzyuba (Polish: Dziuba; Belarusian and Ukrainian: Дзюба) is a surname of Polish, Belarusian and Ukrainian origins. It may refer to:

- Artyom Dzyuba (born 1988), Russian footballer
- Brygida Dziuba (born 1939), Polish gymnast
- Igor Dzyuba (born 1972), Soviet cyclist
- Igor Dziuba (born 1983), Ukrainian speed skater
- Irina Dzyuba (born 1980), Russian gymnast
- Ivan Dziuba (1931–2022), Ukrainian writer
- Maria Dziuba (born 1945), Polish politician
- Marcin Dziuba (born 1983), Polish chess player
- Marek Dziuba (born 1955), Polish footballer
- Roman Dzyuba (born 1979), Ukrainian Paralympic athlete
- Viktor Dzyuba (born 1977), Russian politician
- Vadim Dzyuba (born 1992), Russian stage and film actor, poet, and activist
