= Mongolia at the 1992 Summer Olympics =

- IOC code: MGL
- NOC: Mongolian National Olympic Committee

in Barcelona
- Competitors: 33 (27 men, 6 women) in 8 sports
- Flag bearer: Badmaanyambuugiin Bat-Erdene
- Medals Ranked 52nd: Gold 0 Silver 0 Bronze 2 Total 2

Summer Olympics appearances (overview)
- 1964; 1968; 1972; 1976; 1980; 1984; 1988; 1992; 1996; 2000; 2004; 2008; 2012; 2016; 2020; 2024

Mongolia competed at the 1992 Summer Olympics in Barcelona, Spain. 33 competitors, 27 men and 6 women, took part in 31 events in 8 sports.

== Medalists ==
Medal	Name	Sport	Event	Date
Bronze	Munkhbayar Dorjsuren	Shooting	Women's 25 metre pistol	27 July
Bronze	Namjilyn Bayarsaikhan	Boxing	Lightweight	6 August

== Competitors ==
The following is the list of number of competitors in the Games.

Sport	Men	Women	Total
Archery	0	1	1
Athletics	1	0	1
Boxing	6	–	6
Cycling	4	0	4
Judo	7	3	10
Shooting	0	2	2
Weightlifting	2	–	2
Wrestling	7	–	7
Total	27	6	33

== Archery ==
In the fifth time they competed in archery at the Olympics, Mongolia entered only one woman. She lost in the first round of elimination.

Women's Individual Competition:

- Jargal Otgon – Round of 32, 17th place (0–1)

== Athletics ==
Men's Marathon

- Pyambuugiin Tuul – 4:00.44 (→ 87th place)

== Boxing ==
Men's Light Flyweight (– 48 kg)

- Erdenentsogt Tsogtjargal

- First Round – Defeated Fernando Retayud (COL), 8:2
- Second Round – Lost to Rogelio Marcelo (CUB), 2:14

== Cycling ==
Four male cyclists represented Mongolia in 1992.

Men's road race

- Jamsran Ulzii-Orshikh - 79th place
- Dashjamtsyn Mönkhbat - 83rd place
- Dashnyamyn Tömör-Ochir - DNF

Men's team time trial

- Zundui Naran
- Dashnyamyn Tömör-Ochir — 19th place
- Jamsran Ulzii-Orshikh
- Dashjamtsyn Mönkhbat
