= Bahrain at the 1992 Summer Olympics =

- IOC code: BRN
- NOC: Bahrain Olympic Committee

in Barcelona
- Competitors: 10 men in 2 sports
- Flag bearer: Khalid Rabeeah
- Medals: Gold 0 Silver 0 Bronze 0 Total 0

Summer Olympics appearances (overview)
- 1984; 1988; 1992; 1996; 2000; 2004; 2008; 2012; 2016; 2020; 2024; 2028

Bahrain competed at the 1992 Summer Olympics in Barcelona, Spain. Ten competitors, all men, took part in ten events in two sports.

== Competitors ==
The following is the list of number of competitors in the Games.

Sport	Men	Women	Total
Athletics	6	0	6
Cycling	4	0	4
Total	10	0	10

== Athletics ==
Track and road events

Athlete	Event	Heats		Quarterfinal		Semifinal		Final	
Athlete	Event	Result	Rank	Result	Rank	Result	Rank	Result	Rank
Khalid Ibrahim Jouma	Men's 100 m	10.80	48	Did not advance					
Khalid Ibrahim Jouma	Men's 200 m	21.55	45	Did not advance					
Abdullah Al-Dosari	Men's 5000 m	14:23.07	43	—N/a				Did not advance	
Abdullah Al-Dosari	Men's 10,000 m	DNF		—N/a				Did not advance	
Saad Mubarak Ali	Men's marathon	—N/a						2:39:19	79
Khaled Abdullah Hassan	Men's 110 m hurdles	15.41	39	Did not advance					

Field events

Athlete	Event	Qualification		Final	
Athlete	Event	Distance	Position	Distance	Position
Rashid Riyadh Al-Ameeri	Men's hammer throw	56.08	26	Did not advance	
Youssef Ali Nesaif Boukhamas	Men's javelin throw	55.24	31	Did not advance	

== Cycling ==
Four cyclists represented Bahrain in 1992.

=== Road ===
Athlete	Event	Time	Rank
Jamal Ahmed Al-Doseri	Men's road race	DNF	
Saber Mohamed Hasan	Men's road race	DNF	
Jameel Kadhem	Men's road race	DNF	
Jamal Ahmed Al-Doseri; Mamdooh Al-Doseri; Saber Mohamed Hasan; Jameel Kadhem	Men's team time trial	2:26:00	22
