= Colin Davidson =

Colin Davidson may refer to:

- Colin Davidson (Australian Army officer) (1902–1979), land surveyor and Australian Army officer awarded the US Medal of Freedom
- Colin Davidson (cyclist) (born 1969), Canadian cyclist
- Colin Davidson (artist) (born 1968), Irish visual artist
