= Swiss National Time Trial Championships =

National road cycling championship in Switzerland

The champion's jersey

The Swiss National Time Trial Championship is a road bicycle race that takes place inside the Swiss National Cycling Championship, and decides the best cyclist in this type of race. The first winner was Viktor Kunz in 1993. Fabian Cancellara made the remarkable achievement of 10 wins between 2002 and 2014. The women's record is held by Karin Thürig with 7 wins.

== Multiple winners ==
=== Men ===
| Wins | Name | Years |
|---|---|---|
| 10 | Fabian Cancellara | 2002, 2004, 2005, 2006, 2007, 2008, 2012, 2013, 2014, 2016 |
| 6 | Stefan Küng | 2017, 2018, 2019, 2020, 2021, 2024 |
| 2 | Rubens Bertogliati | 2009, 2010 |

=== Women ===
| Wins | Name | Years |
|---|---|---|
| 7 | Karin Thürig | 2002, 2004, 2005, 2006, 2007, 2008, 2009 |
| 4 | Marlen Reusser | 2017, 2019, 2020, 2021 |
| 2 | Priska Doppmann | 2004, 2008 |
| 2 | Pascale Schnider | 2010, 2011 |
| 2 | Patricia Schwager | 2012, 2013 |
| 2 | Doris Schweizer | 2015, 2016 |

== Men ==
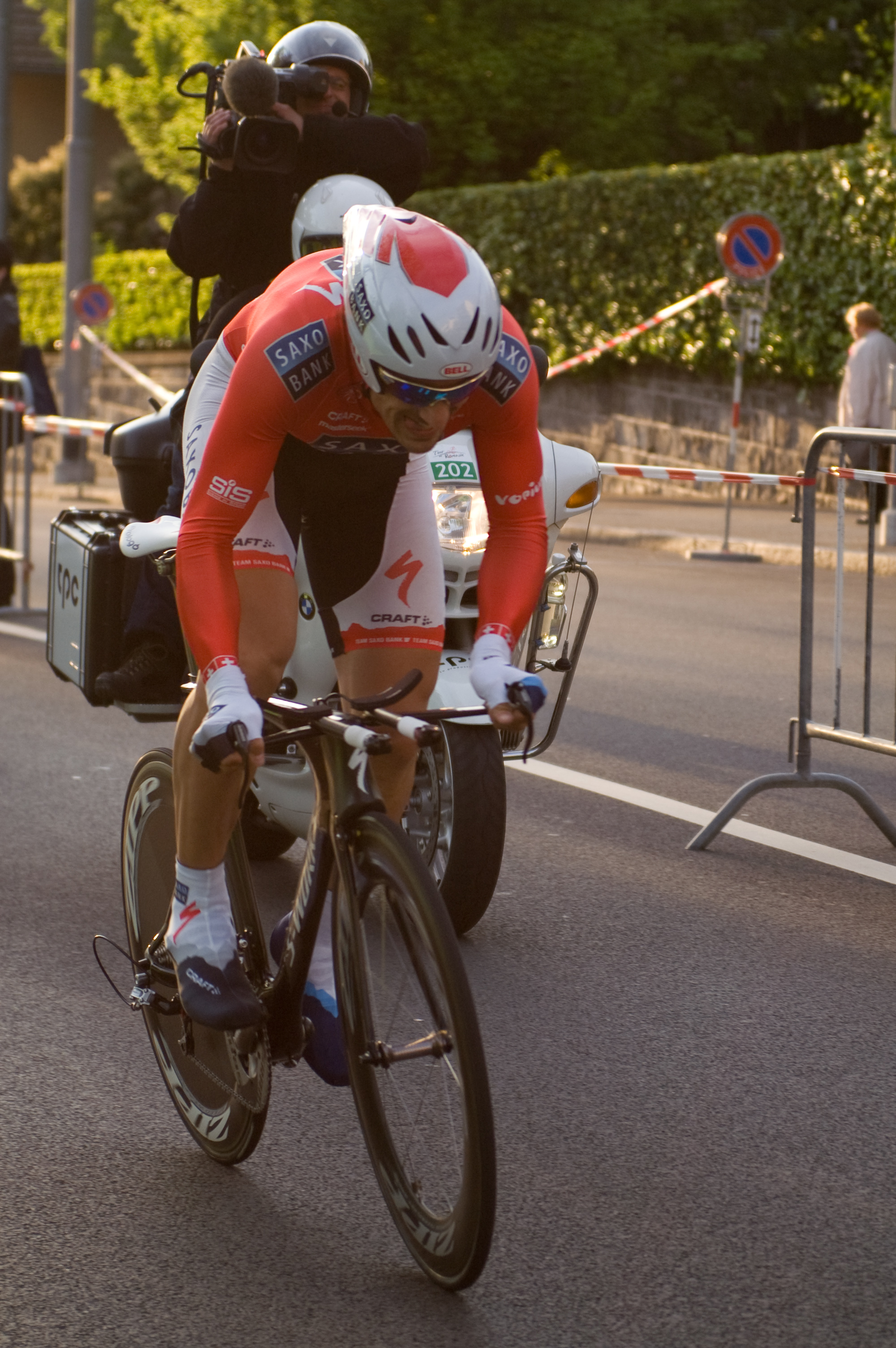
Fabian Cancellara

=== Elite ===
| Year | Gold | Silver | Bronze |
| 1993 | Viktor Kunz | Roland Meier | Albert Hürlimann |
| 1994 | Roman Jeker | Beat Zberg | Andreas Aeschbach |
| 1995 | Roland Meier | Philip Buschor | Beat Meister |
| 1996–1997 | not held | | |
| 1998 | Beat Zberg | Bruno Boscardin | Roland Meier |
| 1999 | not held | | |
| 2000 | Patrick Calcagni | Bruno Boscardin | Jean Nuttli |
| 2001 | Jean Nuttli | Fabian Cancellara | Rubens Bertogliati |
| 2002 | Fabian Cancellara | Jean Nuttli | Rubens Bertogliati |
| 2003 | not held | | |
| 2004 | Fabian Cancellara | Fabian Jeker | Jean Nuttli |
| 2005 | Fabian Cancellara | Martin Elmiger | Fabian Jeker |
| 2006 | Fabian Cancellara | Simon Schärer | Simon Zahner |
| 2007 | Fabian Cancellara | Simon Zahner | David Vitoria |
| 2008 | Fabian Cancellara | Rubens Bertogliati | Andreas Dietziker |
| 2009 | Rubens Bertogliati | Mathias Frank | Joël Frey |
| 2010 | Rubens Bertogliati | Alexander Äschbach | Martin Elmiger |
| 2011 | Martin Kohler | Marcel Wyss | Mathias Frank |
| 2012 | Fabian Cancellara | Thomas Frei | Martin Elmiger |
| 2013 | Fabian Cancellara | Martin Elmiger | Reto Hollenstein |
| 2014 | Fabian Cancellara | Stefan Küng | Silvan Dillier |
| 2015 | Silvan Dillier | Reto Hollenstein | Steve Morabito |
| 2016 | Fabian Cancellara | Reto Hollenstein | Simon Pellaud |
| 2017 | Stefan Küng | Silvan Dillier | Théry Schir |
| 2018 | Stefan Küng | Silvan Dillier | Tom Bohli |
| 2019 | Stefan Küng | Marc Hirschi | Reto Hollenstein |
| 2020 | Stefan Küng | Silvan Dillier | Stefan Bissegger |
| 2021 | Stefan Küng | Marc Hirschi | Théry Schir |
| 2022 | Joel Suter | Mauro Schmid | Tom Bohli |
| 2023 | Stefan Bissegger | Yannis Voisard | Noah Bögli |
| 2024 | Stefan Küng | Stefan Bissegger | Jan Christen |

=== U23 ===
| Year | Gold | Silver | Bronze |
| 1998 | Milovan Stanic | Sandro Güttinger | Reto Lauper |
| 1999 | not held | | |
| 2000 | Fabian Cancellara | Sandro Güttinger | Franco Marvulli |
| 2001– 2003 | not held | | |
| 2004 | Andreas Dietziker | Simon Zahner | Patrick Gassmann |
| 2005 | Michael Schär | Simon Zahner | Simon Schärer |
| 2006 | Michael Schär | Thomas Frei | Robert Odink |
| 2007 | Mathias Frank | Marcel Wyss | Nicolas Schnyder |
| 2008 | Marcel Wyss | Nicolas Schnyder | Dominique Stark |
| 2009 | Nicolas Schnyder | Sepp Freiburghaus | Daniel Henggeler |
| 2010 | Silvan Dillier | Michael Hofstetter | Lorenzo Rossi |
| 2011 | Silvan Dillier | Lorenzo Rossi | Grégory Hugentobler |
| 2012 | Silvan Dillier | Patrick Schelling | Gabriel Chavanne |
| 2013 | Stefan Küng | Théry Schir | Gabriel Chavanne |
| 2014 | Théry Schir | Tom Bohli | Fabian Lienhard |
| 2015 | Théry Schir | Tom Bohli | Frank Pasche |
| 2016 | Martin Schäppi | Lukas Spengler | Patrick Müller |
| 2017 | Marc Hirschi | Justin Paroz | Reto Müller |
| 2018 | Stefan Bissegger | Gino Mäder | Martin Schäppi |
| 2019 | Stefan Bissegger | Damian Lüscher | Mauro Schmid |
| 2020 | Alexandre Balmer | Joel Suter | Robin Froidevaux |
| 2021 | Valère Thiébaud | Alex Vogel | Lars Heiniger |
| 2022 | Fabian Weiss | Nils Brun | Fabio Christen |

== Women ==
=== Elite ===
| Year | Gold | Silver | Bronze |
| 1998 | Karin Möbes | | |
| 1999 | not held | | |
| 2000 | Nicole Brändli | Priska Doppmann | Marcia Eicher-Vouets |
| 2001 | Priska Doppmann | Karin Thürig | Nicole Brändli |
| 2002 | Karin Thürig | Nicole Brändli | Priska Doppmann |
| 2003 | Priska Doppmann | Annette Beutler | Diana Rast |
| 2004 | Karin Thürig | Priska Doppmann | Nicole Brändli |
| 2005 | Karin Thürig | Priska Doppmann | Pascale Schnider |
| 2006 | Karin Thürig | Pascale Schnider | Franziska Röthlin |
| 2007 | Karin Thürig | Priska Doppmann | Pascale Schnider |
| 2008 | Karin Thürig | Sereina Trachsel | Priska Doppmann |
| 2009 | Karin Thürig | Patricia Schwager | Pascale Schnider |
| 2010 | Pascale Schnider | Patricia Schwager | Marielle Saner-Guinchard |
| 2011 | Pascale Schnider | Patricia Schwager | Caroline Steffen |
| 2012 | Patricia Schwager | Jutta Stienen | Andrea Wölfer |
| 2013 | Patricia Schwager | Doris Schweizer | Jutta Stienen |
| 2014 | Linda Indergand | Doris Schweizer | Nicole Hanselmann |
| 2015 | Doris Schweizer | Ramona Forchini | Marcia Eicher-Vouets |
| 2016 | Doris Schweizer | Nicole Hanselmann | Jutta Stienen |
| 2017 | Marlen Reusser | Marcia Eicher-Vouets | Nicole Hanselmann |
| 2018 | Nicole Hanselmann | Nicola Spirig | Marcia Eicher-Vouets |
| 2019 | Marlen Reusser | Marcia Eicher-Vouets | Elise Chabbey |
| 2020 | Marlen Reusser | Elise Chabbey | Kathrin Stirnemann |
| 2021 | Marlen Reusser | Melanie Maurer | Fabienne Buri |
| 2022 | Elena Hartmann | Melanie Maurer | Michelle Stark |
