= Lars Johnsen =

Lars Johnsen can refer to:

- Lars Gunnar Johnsen (born 1991), Norwegian footballer
- Lars Kristian Johnsen (born 1970), Norwegian cyclist
