= Bolay (disambiguation) =

Bolay may refer to:

- Sylvain Bolay (born 1963), French cyclist
- Veronica Bolay (1941–2010), German-Irish artist
- Bolay, a synonym for Pu'er tea
- Bolay, a single from Uzair Jaswal
