= Tennis at the 1992 Summer Olympics – Women's singles =

Tennis at the Olympics

Women's singles
- Tennis at the 1992 Summer Olympics

Final
- Champion: Jennifer Capriati (USA)
- Runner-up: Steffi Graf (GER)
- Score: 3–6, 6–3, 6–4

Events
Singles	men	women
Doubles	men	women
← 1988 ·	Summer Olympics	· 1996 →

Women's singles tennis at the Games of the XXV Olympiad
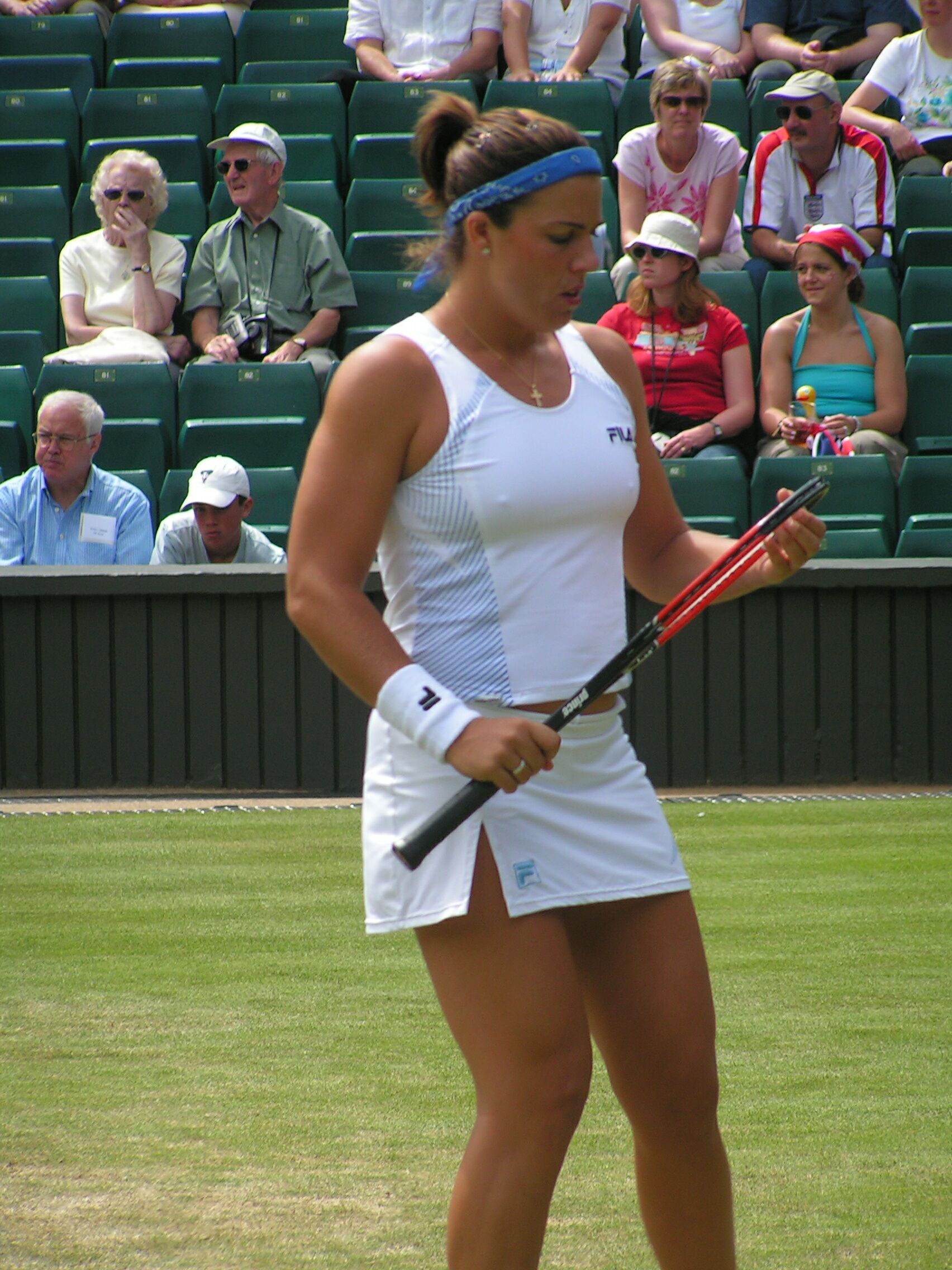
- Gold medalist Jennifer Capriati (2004)
- Venue: Tennis de la Vall d'Hebron
- Dates: 28 July–7 August 1992
- Competitors: 64 from 30 nations

Medalists
1st place, gold medalist(s)		Jennifer Capriati; United States
2nd place, silver medalist(s)		Steffi Graf; Germany
3rd place, bronze medalist(s)		Mary Joe Fernández; United States
3rd place, bronze medalist(s)		Arantxa Sánchez Vicario; Spain

The United States' Jennifer Capriati defeated the defending gold medalist, Germany's Steffi Graf, in the final, 3–6, 6–3, 6–4 to win the gold medal in Women's Singles tennis at the 1992 Summer Olympics. It was the first victory for the United States in the event since 1924, and the first medal in the event for united Germany (rather than West Germany) since 1912. The United States' Mary Joe Fernández and Spain's Arantxa Sánchez Vicario won the bronze medals. It was Spain's first medal in the women's singles.

The tournament was held from 28 July to 7 August at the Tennis de la Vall d'Hebron in Barcelona, Spain. There were 64 competitors from 30 nations, with each nation having up to 3 players.

== Background ==
This was the seventh appearance of the women's singles tennis. A women's event was held only once during the first three Games (only men's tennis was played in 1896 and 1904), but has been held at every Olympics for which there was a tennis tournament since 1908. Tennis was not a medal sport from 1928 to 1984, though there were demonstration events in 1968 and 1984.

Germany's Steffi Graf was the defending Olympic champion (who had achieved the Golden version of the Grand Slam in 1988) and the #1 seed again in 1992. Two of her top competitors, Martina Navratilova of the United States and Monica Seles of Yugoslavia, were ineligible because they had not played in the Billie Jean King Cup. The #2 seed was home crowd favorite Arantxa Sánchez Vicario. The United States had the #3 seed and #4 seed in young phenom Jennifer Capriati and Mary Joe Fernández.

Chile, the People's Republic of China, Latvia, Madagascar, Poland, Romania, South Africa, and Switzerland each made their debut in the event; some former Soviet republics competed as the Unified Team. France and Great Britain each made their sixth appearance, tied for most among nations to that point.

== Competition format ==
The competition was a single-elimination tournament. Unlike previous Olympic tournaments, no bronze medal match was held. All matches were best-of-three sets. The 12-point tie-breaker was used in any set, except the third, that reached 6–6.

== Schedule ==
All times are Central European Summer Time (UTC+2)

Date	Time	Round
Tuesday, 28 July 1992; Wednesday, 29 July 1992		Round of 64
Thursday, 30 July 1992; Friday, 31 July 1992		Round of 32
Saturday, 1 August 1992		Round of 16
Monday, 3 August 1992		Quarterfinals
Wednesday, 5 August 1992	11:00	Semifinals
Friday, 7 August 1992	14:00	Final

== Seeds ==
1. Steffi Graf (GER) (final, silver medalist)
2. Arantxa Sánchez Vicario (ESP) (semifinals, bronze medalist)
3. Jennifer Capriati (USA) (champion, gold medalist)
4. Mary Joe Fernández (USA) (semifinals, bronze medalist)
5. Conchita Martínez (ESP) (quarterfinals)
6. Manuela Maleeva-Fragniere (SUI) (quarterfinals)
7. Anke Huber (GER) (quarterfinals)
8. Katerina Maleeva (BUL) (second round)
9. Jana Novotná (TCH) (first round)
10. Nathalie Tauziat (FRA) (second round)
11. Helena Suková (TCH) (second round)
12. Zina Garrison-Jackson (USA) (first round)
13. Mary Pierce (FRA) (second round)
14. Kimiko Date (JPN) (second round)
15. Julie Halard (FRA) (second round)
16. Sabine Appelmans (BEL) (quarterfinals)

== Draw ==
Key

- Q = Qualifier
- WC = Wild card
- LL = Lucky loser
- Alt = Alternate
- ITF = ITF entry
- PR = Protected ranking
- SR = Special ranking
- SE = Special exempt
- JE = Junior exempt
- JR = Junior Accelerator Programme entrant
- CO = College Accelerator Programme entrant
- NG = Next Gen Accelerator Program entrant
- w/o = Walkover
- r = Retired
- d = Defaulted

=== Finals ===
Quarterfinals
1	Steffi Graf (GER)	6	6
16	Sabine Appelmans (BEL)	1	0
4	Mary Joe Fernández (USA)	5	6	6
6	Manuela Maleeva-Fragniere (SUI)	7	1	0
7	Anke Huber (GER)	3	6^{1}
3	Jennifer Capriati (USA)	6	7
5	Conchita Martínez (ESP)	4	4
2	Arantxa Sánchez Vicario (ESP)	6	6

Semifinals
1	Steffi Graf (GER)	6	6
4	Mary Joe Fernández (USA)	4	2
3	Jennifer Capriati (USA)	6	3	6
2	Arantxa Sánchez Vicario (ESP)	3	6	1

Final
1	Steffi Graf (GER)	6	3	4
3	Jennifer Capriati (USA)	3	6	6

=== Top half ===
==== Section 1 ====
First round
1	S Graf (GER)	6	6
LL	L Novelo (MEX)	1	1
B Schultz (NED)	7	6^{4}	6
Q	F Li (CHN)	5	7	4
E Zardo (SUI)	2	4
Mag Maleeva (BUL)	6	6
Q	R Simpson-Alter (CAN)	5	1
14	K Date (JPN)	7	6
16	S Appelmans (BEL)	6	6
R McQuillan (AUS)	3	3
N Provis (AUS)	6	6
WC	K Piccolini (ITA)	1	0
Alt	P Ritter (AUT)	1	6^{4}
Q	E Maniokova (EUN)	6	7
L Savchenko (LAT)	6^{3}	2
8	K Maleeva (BUL)	7	6

Second round
1	S Graf (GER)	6	6
B Schultz (NED)	1	0
Mag Maleeva (BUL)	6	6
14	K Date (JPN)	2	4
16	S Appelmans (BEL)	6	6
N Provis (AUS)	2	1
Q	E Maniokova (EUN)	7	4	6
8	K Maleeva (BUL)	6^{5}	6	0

Third round
1	S Graf (GER)	6	6
Mag Maleeva (BUL)	3	4
16	S Appelmans (BEL)	6	6
Q	E Maniokova (EUN)	1	3

Quarterfinals
1	S Graf (GER)	6	6
16	S Appelmans (BEL)	1	0

==== Section 2 ====
First round
4	M J Fernández (USA)	6	6
Q	L-L Chen (CHN)	2	3
P Hy (CAN)	6	6
Q	D Randriantefy (MAD)	2	1
Alt	S Gomer (GBR)	6	3	1
Alt	S Smith (GBR)	2	6	6
N Zvereva (EUN)	6	6
9	J Novotná (TCH)	1	0
11	H Suková (TCH)	6	6
Q	N Randriantefy (MAD)	0	1
Q	A Gavaldón (MEX)	6	6
C Lindqvist (SWE)	4	3
WC	J Byrne (AUS)	4	6^{2}
R Reggi-Concato (ITA)	6	7
Q	A Vieira (BRA)	2	3
6	Man Maleeva-Fragniere (SUI)	6	6

Second round
4	M J Fernández (USA)	6	1	12
P Hy (CAN)	2	6	10
Alt	S Smith (GBR)	1	2
N Zvereva (EUN)	6	6
11	H Suková (TCH)	6	4	3^{r}
Q	A Gavaldón (MEX)	4	6	5
R Reggi-Concato (ITA)	2	4
6	Man Maleeva-Fragniere (SUI)	6	6

Third round
4	M J Fernández (USA)	7	6
N Zvereva (EUN)	6^{9}	1
Q	A Gavaldón (MEX)	0	3
6	Man Maleeva-Fragniere (SUI)	6	6

Quarterfinals
4	M J Fernández (USA)	5	6	6
6	Man Maleeva-Fragniere (SUI)	7	1	0

=== Bottom half ===
==== Section 3 ====
First round
7	A Huber (GER)	6	4	6
N Sawamatsu (JPN)	0	6	2
M Javer (GBR)	7	4	3
B Paulus (AUT)	6^{9}	6	6
Q	I-S Kim (KOR)	4	4
Q	N Muns-Jagerman (NED)	6	6
Q	K Nowak (POL)	4	6^{1}
15	J Halard (FRA)	6	7
13/WC	M Pierce (FRA)	7	7
L Meskhi (EUN)	6^{5}	5
WC	M Paz (ARG)	1	4
Y Basuki (INA)	6	6
Alt	P Tarabini (ARG)	6	6
M de Swardt (RSA)	4	2
WC	E Reinach (RSA)	1	0
3	J Capriati (USA)	6	6

Second round
7	A Huber (GER)	6	6
B Paulus (AUT)	4	1
Q	N Muns-Jagerman (NED)	7	7
15	J Halard (FRA)	6^{3}	6^{5}
13/WC	M Pierce (FRA)	6	3	8
Y Basuki (INA)	0	6	10
Alt	P Tarabini (ARG)	4	1
3	J Capriati (USA)	6	6

Third round
7	A Huber (GER)	7	7
Q	N Muns-Jagerman (NED)	5	6^{3}
Y Basuki (INA)	3	4
3	J Capriati (USA)	6	6

Quarterfinals
7	A Huber (GER)	3	6^{1}
3	J Capriati (USA)	6	7

==== Section 4 ====
First round
5	C Martínez (ESP)	4	6	6
J Wiesner (AUT)	6	1	2
Q	P Sepúlveda (CHI)	2	3
S Cecchini (ITA)	6	6
LL	C Papadáki (GRE)	6	1	2
LL	A Blumberga (LAT)	4	6	6
A Coetzer (RSA)	7	6
12/WC	Z Garrison-Jackson (USA)	5	1
10	N Tauziat (FRA)	6	6
WC	R Zrubáková (TCH)	3	2
F Labat (ARG)	3	3
WC	B Rittner (GER)	6	6
Q	E Pampoulova (BUL)	6^{4}	6^{6}
Q	M Endo (JPN)	7	7
Q	I Spîrlea (ROM)	1	3
2	A Sánchez Vicario (ESP)	6	6

Second round
5	C Martínez (ESP)	6	6
S Cecchini (ITA)	4	3
LL	A Blumberga (LAT)	2	4
A Coetzer (RSA)	6	6
10	N Tauziat (FRA)	3	2
WC	B Rittner (GER)	6	6
Q	M Endo (JPN)	0	1
2	A Sánchez Vicario (ESP)	6	6

Third round
5	C Martínez (ESP)	6	6
A Coetzer (RSA)	4	3
WC	B Rittner (GER)	6	3	1
2	A Sánchez Vicario (ESP)	4	6	6

Quarterfinals
5	C Martínez (ESP)	4	4
2	A Sánchez Vicario (ESP)	6	6
