= Tennis at the 1992 Summer Olympics – Men's singles =

Men's singles
- Tennis at the 1992 Summer Olympics

Final
- Champion: (Switzerland) Marc Rosset
- Runner-up: (Spain) Jordi Arrese
- Score: 7−6^{2}, 6−4, 3−6, 4−6, 8−6

Events
Singles	men	women
Doubles	men	women
- Summer Olympics

Men's singles tennis at the Games of the XXV Olympiad
- Tennis pictogram
- Venue: Tennis de la Vall d'Hebron, Barcelona
- Dates: 28 July–8 August 1992
- Competitors: 64 from 35 nations

Medalists
1st place, gold medalist(s)		Marc Rosset; Switzerland
2nd place, silver medalist(s)		Jordi Arrese; Spain
3rd place, bronze medalist(s)		Goran Ivanišević; Croatia
3rd place, bronze medalist(s)		Andrei Cherkasov; Unified Team

Switzerland's Marc Rosset defeated Spain's Jordi Arrese in the final, 7–6^{(7–2)}, 6–4, 3–6, 4–6, 8–6 to win the gold medal in Men's Singles tennis at the 1992 Summer Olympics. Croatia's Goran Ivanišević and the Unified Team's Andrei Cherkasov won the bronze medals. All four nations won medals in men's singles for the first time.

The tournament was held at the Tennis de la Vall d'Hebron in Barcelona, Spain. There were 64 players from 35 nations. Nations had been limited to three players each since tennis returned to the Olympic program in 1988.

Miloslav Mečíř of Czechoslovakia was the reigning gold medalist from 1988, but he retired from the sport in 1990.

== Background ==
This was the ninth (medal) appearance of the men's singles tennis event. The event has been held at every Summer Olympics where tennis has been on the program: from 1896 to 1924 and then from 1988 to the current program. Demonstration events were held in 1968 and 1984.

The number one seed was Jim Courier of the United States. Stefan Edberg of Sweden was the number two seed, while American Pete Sampras was third. Stefan Edberg and Carl-Uwe Steeb of Germany were the only two quarterfinalists from 1988 that returned.

The Bahamas, Croatia, Indonesia, Morocco, Peru, and Puerto Rico each made their debut in the event. Some former Soviet republics competed as the Unified Team. One Yugoslav player competed as an Independent Olympic Participant. France made its eighth appearance, most among all nations, having missed only the 1904 event.

== Competition format ==
The competition was a single-elimination tournament. No bronze medal match was held. All matches were best-of-five sets. The 12-point tie-breaker was used in any set, except the fifth, that reached 6–6.

== Schedule ==
All times are Central European Summer Time (UTC+2)

Date	Time	Round
Tuesday, 28 July 1992; Wednesday, 29 July 1992		Round of 64
Thursday, 30 July 1992; Friday, 31 July 1992		Round of 32
Saturday, 1 August 1992; Sunday, 2 August 1992		Round of 16
Monday, 3 August 1992; Tuesday, 4 August 1992		Quarterfinals
Thursday, 6 August 1992	11:00	Semifinals
Saturday, 8 August 1992	14:00	Final

== Seeds ==
1. Jim Courier (USA) (third round)
2. Stefan Edberg (SWE) (first round)
3. Pete Sampras (USA) (third round)
4. Goran Ivanišević (CRO) (semifinals, bronze medalist)
5. Boris Becker (GER) (third round)
6. Michael Chang (USA) (second round)
7. Guy Forget (FRA) (second round)
8. Michael Stich (GER) (second round)
9. Wayne Ferreira (RSA) (second round)
10. Thomas Muster (AUT) (first round)
11. Sergi Bruguera (ESP) (second round)
12. Emilio Sánchez (ESP) (quarterfinals)
13. Andrei Cherkasov (EUN) (semifinals, bronze medalist)
14. Amos Mansdorf (ISR) (withdrew)
15. Jakob Hlasek (SUI) (third round)
16. Jordi Arrese (ESP) (final, silver medalist)

== Draw ==
Key

- Q = Qualifier
- WC = Wild card
- LL = Lucky loser
- Alt = Alternate
- ITF = ITF entry
- PR = Protected ranking
- SR = Special ranking
- SE = Special exempt
- JE = Junior exempt
- JR = Junior Accelerator Programme entrant
- CO = College Accelerator Programme entrant
- NG = Next Gen Accelerator Program entrant
- w/o = Walkover
- r = Retired
- d = Defaulted

=== Finals ===
Quarterfinals
Marc Rosset (SUI)	6	7^{7}	3	7^{11}
12	Emilio Sánchez (ESP)	4	6^{2}	6	6^{9}
4	Goran Ivanišević (CRO)	6^{5}	6^{1}	6	6	8
Fabrice Santoro (FRA)	7^{7}	7^{7}	4	4	6
Jaime Oncins (BRA)	1	4	7^{7}	6	2
13	Andrei Cherkasov (EUN)	6	6	6^{3}	4	6
Alt	Leonardo Lavalle (MEX)	1	6^{6}	1
16/WC	Jordi Arrese (ESP)	6	7^{8}	6

Semifinals
Marc Rosset (SUI)	6	7	6
4	Goran Ivanišević (CRO)	3	5	2
13	Andrei Cherkasov (EUN)	4	6^{4}	6	3
16/WC	Jordi Arrese (ESP)	6	7^{7}	3	6

Final
Marc Rosset (SUI)	7^{7}	6	3	4	8
16/WC	Jordi Arrese (ESP)	6^{2}	4	6	6	6

=== Top half ===
==== Section 1 ====
First round
1	J Courier (USA)	6	4	6	6
WC	R Krishnan (IND)	2	6	1	4
Q	M Vajda (TCH)	6^{7}	1	0
Q	G Bloom (ISR)	7^{9}	6	6
Q	K Alami (MAR)	2	6	1	r
M Rosset (SUI)	6	4	2
C van Rensburg (RSA)	5	2	6	4
9	W Ferreira (RSA)	7	6	2	6
12	E Sánchez (ESP)	6	7^{7}	6
T Woodbridge (AUS)	1	6^{1}	2
O Camporese (ITA)	6	6	6
Q	J Ríos (PUR)	2	2	0
Alt	M Larsson (SWE)	6	6	6
H Skoff (AUT)	2	3	3
C Caratti (ITA)	3	4	2
7	G Forget (FRA)	6	6	6

Second round
1	J Courier (USA)	6	6	6
Q	G Bloom (ISR)	2	0	0
M Rosset (SUI)	6	6	6
9	W Ferreira (RSA)	4	0	2
12	E Sánchez (ESP)	6	6	6
O Camporese (ITA)	4	2	1
Alt	M Larsson (SWE)	6	6	6
7	G Forget (FRA)	3	3	1

Third round
1	J Courier (USA)	4	2	1
M Rosset (SUI)	6	6	6
12	E Sánchez (ESP)	6	7^{7}	6^{5}	6
Alt	M Larsson (SWE)	4	6^{3}	7^{7}	4

Quarterfinals
M Rosset (SUI)	6	7^{7}	3	7^{11}
12	E Sánchez (ESP)	4	6^{2}	6	6^{9}

==== Section 2 ====
First round
4	G Ivanišević (CRO)	6	6	6^{5}	4	6
LL	B Mota (POR)	2	2	7^{7}	6	3
P Haarhuis (NED)	4	6	6	6
Alt	L Mattar (BRA)	6	3	2	2
Q	A Sznajder (CAN)	6	6	7
Q	B Wijaya (INA)	2	4	5
Q	F Maciel (MEX)	3	4	6	2
16	J Hlasek (SUI)	6	6	4	6
Alt	J Frana (ARG)	6	6	6^{3}	6^{3}	6
Alt	P Arraya (PER)	2	0	7^{7}	7^{7}	2
Alt	C Miniussi (ARG)	1	6^{3}	4
F Santoro (FRA)	6	7^{7}	6
LL	Y El Aynaoui (MAR)	6	6	7
LL	C Wilkinson (GBR)	4	1	5
LL	C Ruud (NOR)	6	6^{2}	7	6^{2}	3
5	B Becker (GER)	3	7^{7}	5	7^{7}	6

Second round
4	G Ivanišević (CRO)	6^{4}	6	1	6	6
P Haarhuis (NED)	7^{7}	2	6	3	2
Q	A Sznajder (CAN)	6	4	3	6^{1}
16	J Hlasek (SUI)	4	6	6	7^{7}
Alt	J Frana (ARG)	6	2	1	1
F Santoro (FRA)	4	6	6	6
LL	Y El Aynaoui (MAR)	4	7	4	0
5	B Becker (GER)	6	5	6	6

Third round
4	G Ivanišević (CRO)	3	6	4	7^{7}	9
16	J Hlasek (SUI)	6	0	6	6^{1}	7
F Santoro (FRA)	6	3	6	6
5	B Becker (GER)	1	6	1	3

Quarterfinals
4	G Ivanišević (CRO)	6^{5}	6^{1}	6	6	8
F Santoro (FRA)	7^{7}	7^{7}	4	4	6

=== Bottom half ===
==== Section 3 ====
First round
6/WC	M Chang (USA)	6	6	3	6
A Mancini (ARG)	1	4	6	0
J Oncins (BRA)	7^{7}	4	6	4	6
Q	S Muškatirović (IOP)	6^{3}	6	1	6	1
Q	S Noszály (HUN)	2	3	6	2
Alt	M Koevermans (NED)	6	6	2	6
LL	A Castle (GBR)	1	2	3
11	S Bruguera (ESP)	6	6	6
13	A Cherkasov (EUN)	6	6	3	6
Q	R Smith (BAH)	1	0	6	1
Q	K Carlsen (DEN)	4	6	3	5
G Prpić (CRO)	6	4	6	7
Q	L Paes (IND)	6	6^{4}	0	0
J Yzaga (PER)	1	7^{7}	6	6
W Masur (AUS)	1	6^{4}	4
3	P Sampras (USA)	6	7^{7}	6

Second round
6/WC	M Chang (USA)	2	6	3	3
J Oncins (BRA)	6	3	6	6
Alt	M Koevermans (NED)	1	6	6	6
11	S Bruguera (ESP)	6	3	3	2
13	A Cherkasov (EUN)	6	6^{6}	6	6
G Prpić (CRO)	4	7^{8}	4	3
J Yzaga (PER)	3	0	6	1
3	P Sampras (USA)	6	6	3	6

Third round
J Oncins (BRA)	7^{7}	6	7^{7}
Alt	M Koevermans (NED)	6^{1}	0	6^{2}
13	A Cherkasov (EUN)	6^{7}	1	7	6	6
3	P Sampras (USA)	7^{9}	6	5	0	3

Quarterfinals
J Oncins (BRA)	1	4	7^{7}	6	2
13	A Cherkasov (EUN)	6	6	6^{3}	4	6

==== Section 4 ====
First round
8	M Stich (GER)	6	3	6	3	6
Q	R Fromberg (AUS)	3	6	1	6	3
Q	A Pavel (ROM)	5	2	2
WC	C-U Steeb (GER)	7	6	6
Alt	L Lavalle (MEX)	6	6	6
J Siemerink (NED)	4	4	2
WC	H Leconte (FRA)	7^{7}	7^{11}	6
10	T Muster (AUT)	6^{5}	6^{9}	4
16/WC	J Arrese (ESP)	6	6	6
Q	E-J Chang (KOR)	4	2	2
M Gustafsson (SWE)	7^{7}	6	6
LL	O Casey (IRL)	6^{3}	1	4
WC	R Furlan (ITA)	6	6	3	6
S Matsuoka (JPN)	4	3	6	4
WC	A Chesnokov (EUN)	6	6	6
2	S Edberg (SWE)	0	4	4

Second round
8	M Stich (GER)	4	2	6	3
WC	C-U Steeb (GER)	6	6	4	6
Alt	L Lavalle (MEX)	6	3	4	6	10
WC	H Leconte (FRA)	4	6	6	3	8
16/WC	J Arrese (ESP)	6	4	6	3	9
M Gustafsson (SWE)	2	6	1	6	7
WC	R Furlan (ITA)	7^{7}	6	6
WC	A Chesnokov (EUN)	6^{3}	4	4

3rd round
WC	C-U Steeb (GER)	4	6	3	2
Alt	L Lavalle (MEX)	6	3	6	6
16/WC	J Arrese (ESP)	6	6	6
WC	R Furlan (ITA)	4	3	2

Quarterfinals
Alt	L Lavalle (MEX)	1	6^{6}	1
16/WC	J Arrese (ESP)	6	7^{8}	6
