= Guller =

Guller or Güller is a surname. Notable people with the surname include:

- Serhat Güller (born 1968), Turkish footballer and manager
- Urs Güller (born 1967), Swiss cyclist
- Youra Guller (1895–1980), French classical pianist

== See also ==
- Fuller (surname)
