= Thomas Bamford (disambiguation) =

Thomas Bamford may refer to:

- Tom Bamford (1887-1944), English footballer
- Tommy Bamford (1905-1967), Welsh footballer
- Tom Bamford (cyclist) (born 1963), New Zealand cyclist
