= Miguel Fernández =

Miguel Fernández may refer to:

- Miguel Fernández (cyclist) (born 1969), Spanish Olympic cyclist
- Miguel Fernández (footballer) (born 2000), Spanish football left-winger
- Miguel Fernández (golfer) (born 1962), Argentine golfer
- Miguel Fernández Martín (born 1950), Spanish writer in Castilian and Esperanto; see Esperanto literature
- Miguel Fernández Roig (1894–1948), Cuban trade unionist

== See also ==
- Miguel Ángel Fernández (disambiguation)
