= Vuelta a la Argentina =

Cycling race

Race details
- Region: Argentina
- English name: Tour of Argentina
- Discipline: Road
- Type: Stage race

History
- First edition: 1952
- Editions: 6
- Final edition: 2000
- First winner: Rik Van Steenbergen (BEL)
- Most wins: No repeat winners
- Final winner: David Kenig (ARG)

The Vuelta a la Argentina was a multi-day road cycling race held in Argentina. Only six editions were held: in 1952, 1990, 1991, 1992, 1999 and 2000.

== Winners ==
Year	Country	Rider	Team
1952	Belgium	Rik Van Steenbergen	
1990	Uruguay	Sergio Tesitore	España-La Paz
1991	Argentina	Omar Contreras	-
1992	Italy	Angelo Canzonieri	Sevillano Italia
1999	Sweden	Martin Rittsel	Chicky World
2000	Argentina	David Kenig	
