= Stephen Farrell =

Stephen Farrell may refer to:

- Stephen Farrell (journalist) (born 1962), Irish-British journalist
- Stephen Farrell (track and field) (1863–1933), American track athlete and coach
- Stephen Farrell (footballer) (born 1973), footballer for Stoke City
- Stephen Farrell (cyclist) (born 1965), British cyclist
- Steven Farrell (born 1980), Australian cricket player
