= Rinderknecht =

Rinderknecht is a German language occupational surname, meaning "cattle farmhand" (cowboy), and common in Switzerland.

- Andrés Rinderknecht (born 1977), Uruguayan paleontologist who described Josephoartigasia and other species
- Dominique Rinderknecht (born 1989), Swiss model, TV host and beauty pageant titleholder
- Frank M. Rinderknecht (born 1955), Swiss concept car designer, founder and CEO of Rinspeed
- Jonathan Rinderknecht, suspected arsonist
- Nico Ingo Rinderknecht (born 1997), German footballer
- Roger Rinderknecht (born 1981), Swiss racing cyclist
- Theodor Rinderknecht (born 1958), Swiss cyclist

== See also ==
- Susanna Orelli-Rinderknecht (1845–1939), Swiss temperance activist
- Arthur Rinderknech (born 1995), French tennis player
