= Pelle Kil =

Dutch cyclist

Personal information
- Full name: Pelle Tobias Kil
- Born: 26 May 1971 Amsterdam, Netherlands
- Height: 185 cm (6 ft 1 in)
- Weight: 77 kg (170 lb)

Cycling career
- Sport: Cycling
- Discipline: Road cycling

Pelle Tobias Kil (born 26 May 1971) is a cyclist from the Netherlands. He competed in the men's team time trial at the 1992 Summer Olympics, finishing 9th. He finished third in the Dutch National Time Trial Championships in 1993.

== See also ==
- List of Dutch Olympic cyclists
- List of people from Amsterdam
