= Petro Koshelenko =

Russian cyclist

Personal information
- Born: 22 February 1970 (age 56)

Cycling career
- Sport: Cycling

Petro Koshelenko (born 22 February 1970) is a Russian former cyclist. He competed in the individual road race at the 1992 Summer Olympics for the Unified Team.
