= Igor Pastukhovich =

Soviet cyclist

Personal information
- Born: 14 November 1966 (age 59)

Cycling career
- Sport: Cycling

Igor Pastukhovich (born 14 November 1966) is a Soviet former cyclist. He competed in the team time trial at the 1992 Summer Olympics for the Unified Team.
