= Euripides Ferreira =

Brazilian cyclist (born 1966)

Personal information
- Born: 31 July 1966 (age 60)

Cycling career
- Sport: Cycling

Euripides Ferreira (born 31 July 1966) is a Brazilian former cyclist. He competed in the team time trial at the 1992 Summer Olympics.
