= Grzegorz Piwowarski =

Polish sportsperson

Personal information
- Born: 4 December 1971 (age 54) Golub-Dobrzyń, Poland

Cycling career
- Sport: Cycling

Grzegorz Piwowarski (born 4 December 1971) is a Polish former cyclist. He competed in the team time trial at the 1992 Summer Olympics.
