= Darren Smith (cyclist) =

Australian cyclist

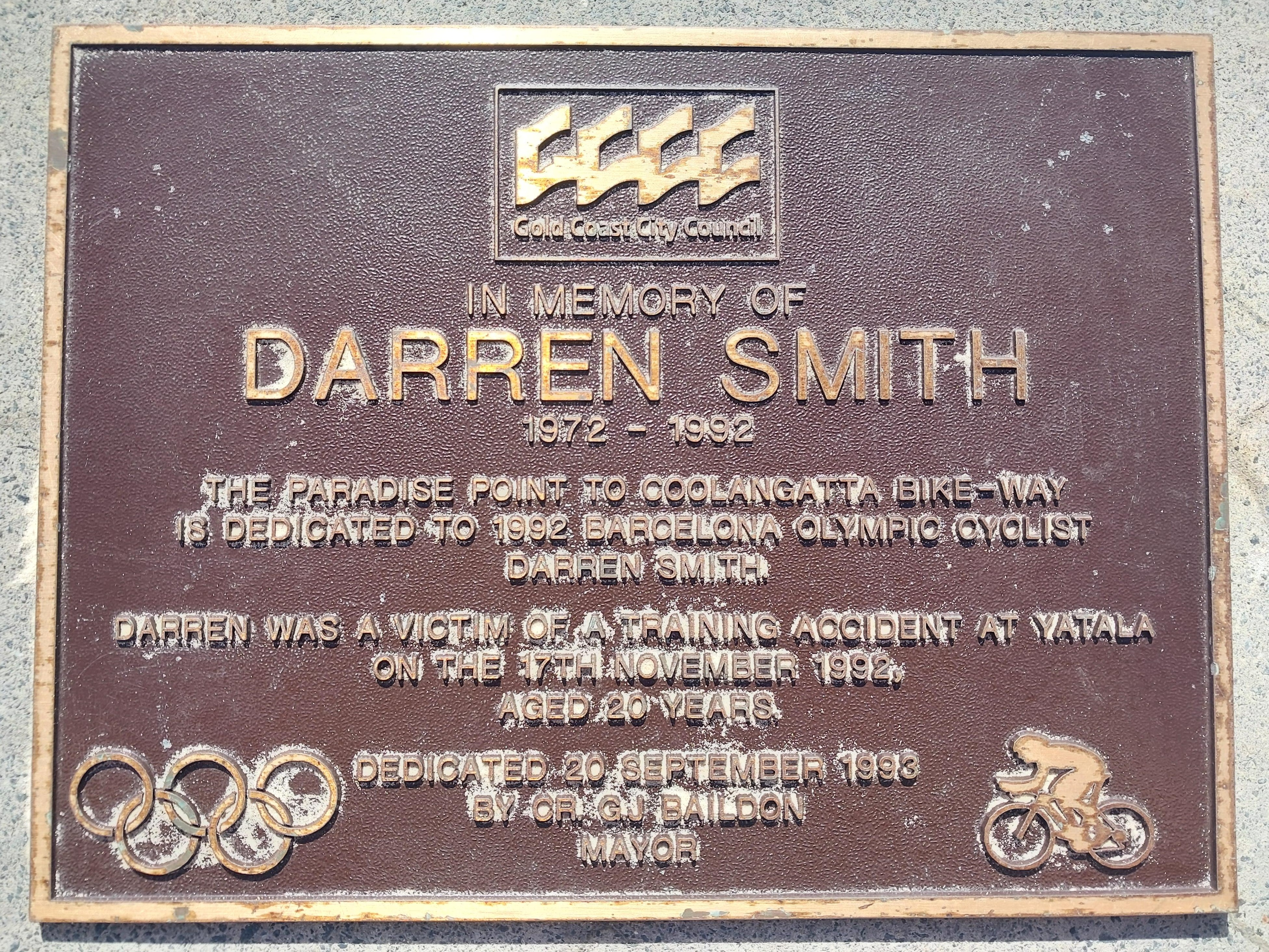
- Commemorative plaque to Darren Smith in Gold Coast, Australia

Personal information
- Born: 21 September 1972
- Died: 17 November 1992 (aged 20) Yatala, Queensland, Australia

Cycling career
- Sport: Cycling

Darren Smith (21 September 1972 – 17 November 1992) was an Australian cyclist. He competed in the individual road race at the 1992 Summer Olympics. He was killed in a road accident just months after the Olympics.

== Major results ==
1992
2nd Overall Bizkaiko Bira
3rd Overall Tour of Sweden
