= Johan Fagrell =

Swedish cyclist

Personal information
- Born: 16 June 1967 (age 59) Motala, Sweden

Cycling career
- Sport: Cycling

Johan Fagrell (born 16 June 1967) is a Swedish former cyclist. He competed in the team time trial at the 1992 Summer Olympics.
