= Conor Henry =

Irish cyclist

Personal information
- Born: 30 July 1970 (age 56)

Cycling career
- Sport: Cycling

Conor Henry (born 30 July 1970) is an Irish former cyclist. He competed in the individual road race at the 1992 Summer Olympics. In the same year, he also won the Milk Race.
