= Nicolas Schnyder =

Swiss cyclist

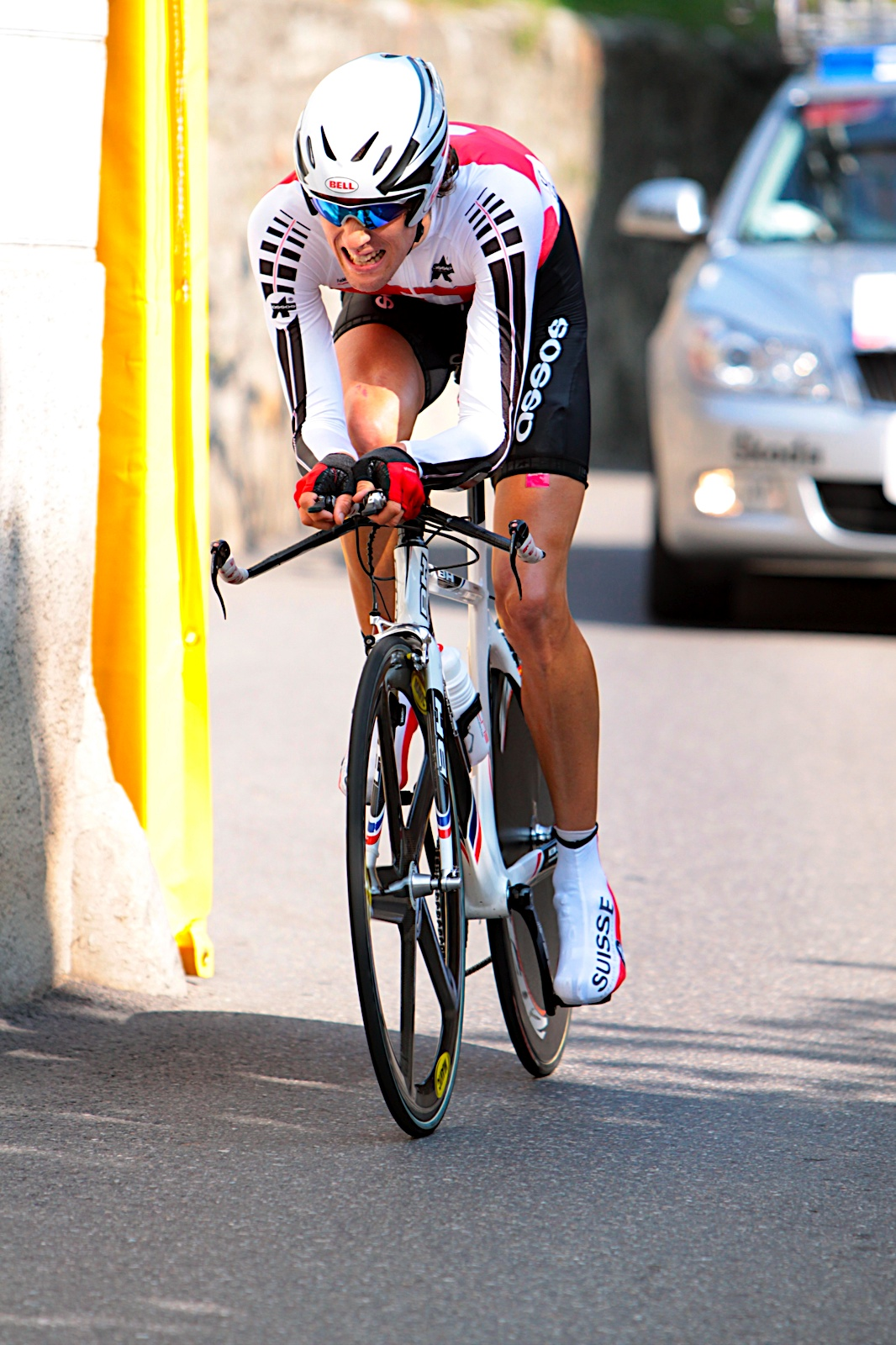
- Schnyder at the 2009 UCI Road World Championships

Personal information
- Born: 9 June 1987 (age 39) Canton of Geneva, Switzerland

Cycling career
- Sport: Cycling
- Current team: Retired
- Discipline: Road
- Role: Rider

Amateur teams
- 2007: Mega-Bike
- 2008–2009: Chambéry CF

Professional teams
- 2006: Hadimec
- 2010–2011: Price–Custom Bikes

Nicolas Schnyder (born 9 June 1987) is a Swiss former professional road cyclist.

== Major results ==
2005
1st Time trial, National Junior Road Championships
2nd Overall Tour du Pays de Vaud
2007
3rd Time trial, National Under-23 Road Championships
2008
2nd Time trial, National Under-23 Road Championships
2009
1st Time trial, National Under-23 Road Championships
8th Overall Tour de l'Avenir
9th Overall Ronde de l'Isard
10th Overall Grand Prix Tell
2010
1st Overall Tour des Pays de Savoie

1st Stage 1

National Road Championships

4th Time trial
5th Road race

5th Giro del Veneto
7th Overall Cinturón a Mallorca
2011
2nd Giro del Mendrisiotto
