= Miloslav Kejval =

Czech cyclist

Personal information
- Born: 11 July 1973 (age 53) Vilémov, Czechoslovakia

Cycling career
- Sport: Cycling

Miloslav Kejval (born 11 July 1973) is a Czech former cyclist. He competed in the individual road race at the 1992 Summer Olympics.
