= Andreas Langl =

Austrian cyclist

Personal information
- Born: 15 October 1966 (age 60) Braunau am Inn, Austria

Cycling career
- Sport: Cycling

Andreas Langl (born 15 October 1966) is an Austrian former cyclist. He competed in the individual road race at the 1992 Summer Olympics.
