= Nicole Hanselmann =

Swiss cyclist

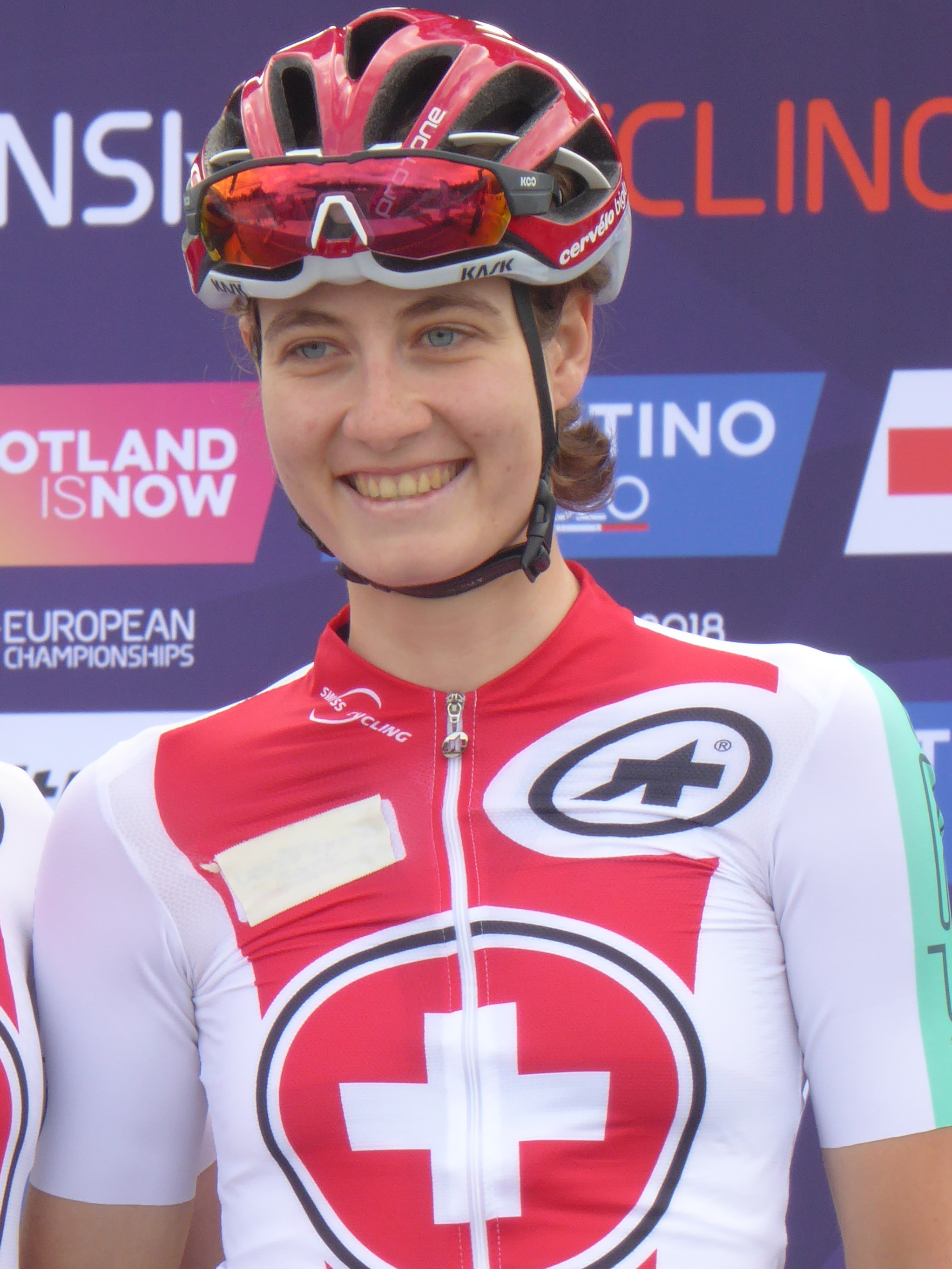
- Hanselmann at the 2018 European Road Cycling Championships.

Personal information
- Full name: Nicole Hanselmann
- Born: 6 May 1991 (age 35) Uster, Zürich, Switzerland
- Height: 169 cm (5 ft 7 in)
- Weight: 55 kg (121 lb)

Cycling career
- Sport: Cycling
- Disciplines: Road; Mountain biking
- Role: Rider
- Rider type: All-rounder

Amateur teams
- 2009–2011: bike-import.CH
- 2012–2013: Bigla Cycling Team

Professional teams
- 2014–2019: Bigla Cycling Team
- 2020: Doltcini–Van Eyck Sport
- 2021: Burgos Alimenta Women Cycling Sport

Nicole Hanselmann (born 6 May 1991) is a Swiss racing cyclist, who rode for UCI Women's Continental Team Burgos Alimenta Women Cycling Sport. She rode at the 2014 UCI Road World Championships.

== Major results ==
2011
5th Time trial, National Road Championships
2012
6th Heydar Aliyev Anniversary Time Trial
2013
5th Road race, National Road Championships
2014
3rd Time trial, National Road Championship
10th Overall Tour de Bretagne Féminin
2016
National Junior Road Championships

2nd Road race
2nd Time trial

2nd Crescent Women World Cup Vargarda
8th Overall Ladies Tour of Norway

1st Stage 1

2017
National Road Championships

1st Road race
3rd Time trial

2nd Crescent Vårgårda TTT
2018
National Road Championships

1st Time trial
3rd Road race

2019
4th Time trial, National Road Championships
