= Aleksey Bochkov =

Russian cyclist

Personal information
- Born: 21 January 1970
- Died: 12 April 2015 (aged 45) Kubinka, Russia

Cycling career
- Sport: Cycling

Aleksey Bochkov (21 January 1970 – 12 April 2015) was a Russian cyclist. He competed in the individual road race at the 1992 Summer Olympics for the Unified Team.
