= Orlando Chavarria =

Belizean cyclist

Personal information
- Born: 31 July 1971 (age 55)

Cycling career
- Sport: Cycling

Orlando Fernando Chavarria (born 31 July 1971) is a Belizean former cyclist. He competed in the team time trial at the 1992 Summer Olympics.
