= Bernd Dittert =

East German cyclist (born 1961)

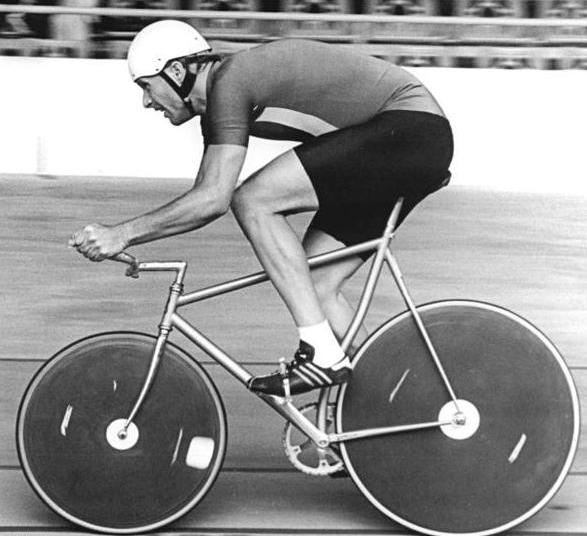
- Dittert in 1988

Personal information
- Born: 6 February 1961 (age 65) Genthin, East Germany

Cycling career
- Sport: Cycling
- Disciplines: Road and track
- Role: Rider
- Rider type: Endurance
Medal record
Representing East Germany
Men's track cycling
Olympic Games
Bronze medal – third place	1988 Seoul	Individual pursuit
Representing Germany
Men's road bicycle racing
Olympic Games
Gold medal – first place	1992 Barcelona	Team time trial

Bernd Dittert (born 6 February 1961) is a retired racing cyclist from East Germany who won the bronze medal for his native country in the men's 4,000m individual pursuit at the 1988 Summer Olympics in Seoul, South Korea. Four years later he won the gold medal in the men's team time trial (road), alongside Michael Rich, Christian Meyer and Uwe Peschel.
