= John Stenner =

American cyclist

Personal information
- Born: September 15, 1964
- Died: May 16, 1994 (aged 29) Mead, Colorado, United States

Cycling career
- Sport: Cycling

John Stenner (September 15, 1964 – May 16, 1994) was an American cyclist. He competed in the team time trial at the 1992 Summer Olympics, and won the United States National Time Trial Championships in the same year. Two years later, Stenner was killed in a road accident when the sun blocked his view of oncoming traffic.
