= Wil Yamamoto =

Guamanian cyclist

Personal information
- Born: 11 January 1974 (age 52)

Cycling career
- Sport: Cycling

Wil Yamamoto (born 11 January 1974) is a former cyclist from Guam. He competed in the team time trial at the 1992 Summer Olympics.
