= Tonny Azevedo =

Brazilian cyclist (born 1969)

Personal information
- Born: 9 August 1969 (age 57)

Cycling career
- Sport: Cycling

Tonny Azevedo (born 9 August 1969) is a Brazilian former cyclist. He competed in the individual road race at the 1992 Summer Olympics.
