= Vatche Zadourian =

Lebanese cyclist (born 1974)

Personal information
- Born: 17 July 1974 (age 52)

Cycling career
- Sport: Cycling

Vatche Zadourian (born 17 July 1974) is a Lebanese former cyclist. He competed in the individual road race at the 1992 Summer Olympics. He did not finish the race.

He was appointed member of the Akhoyans Network for Education and Culture.

In 2017, he was elected member of the Asian Cycling Federation. In 2025, he was appointed technical director of the Asian Cycling Federation.
