= Nathael Sagard =

Canadian cyclist

Personal information
- Born: 17 December 1967 (age 58) Quebec City, Quebec, Canada

Cycling career
- Sport: Cycling
- Discipline: Road cycling

Nathael Sagard (born 17 December 1967) is a Canadian former cyclist. He competed in the individual road race at the 1992 Summer Olympics.
