= Roar Skaane =

Norwegian cyclist

Personal information
- Born: 9 April 1970 (age 56) Horten, Norway

Cycling career
- Sport: Cycling

Roar Skaane (born 9 April 1970) is a Norwegian former cyclist. He competed in the team time trial at the 1992 Summer Olympics.
