= Didier Faivre-Pierret =

French cyclist

Personal information
- Born: 20 April 1965 (age 61) Pontarlier, France

Cycling career
- Sport: Cycling
Medal record
Men's cycling
Representing France
Olympic Games
Bronze medal – third place	1992 Barcelona	Team Time Trial

Didier Faivre-Pierret (French: [didje fɛvʁ pjɛʁɛ]; born 20 April 1965) is a French cyclist. He won the bronze Medal in Team Time Trial in the 1992 Summer Olympics.
