= Svyatoslav Ryabushenko =

Russian cyclist

Personal information
- Born: 3 April 1968 (age 58)

Cycling career
- Sport: Cycling

Svyatoslav Ryabushenko (born 3 April 1968) is a Russian former cyclist. He competed in the individual road race at the 1992 Summer Olympics for the Unified Team.
