= Todd McNutt =

Canadian cyclist

Personal information
- Born: 26 November 1964 (age 61) Calgary, Alberta, Canada

Cycling career
- Sport: Cycling

Todd McNutt (born 26 November 1964) is a Canadian former cyclist. He competed in the team time trial at the 1992 Summer Olympics.
