= Tennis at the 1992 Summer Olympics =

- Date: 28 July–8 August 1992
- Edition: 11
- Surface: Clay (red)
- Location: Tennis de la Vall d'Hebron, Barcelona

Champions

Men's singles
- Marc Rosset (SUI)

Women's singles
- Jennifer Capriati (USA)

Men's doubles
- Boris Becker / Michael Stich (GER)

Women's doubles
- Gigi Fernández / Mary Joe Fernández (USA)
- Summer Olympics

These are the final results for the tennis competition at the 1992 Summer Olympics in Barcelona, Spain.

American teenager Jennifer Capriati defeated German (and defending champion) Steffi Graf in the women's singles final to win the gold medal. Marc Rosset became the first Swiss Olympic tennis gold medallist.

The matches were played on outdoor clay courts at the Tennis de la Vall d'Hebron.

== Medal summary ==
=== Events ===
| Event | Gold | Silver | Bronze |
|---|---|---|---|
| Men's singles | Marc Rosset; Switzerland | Jordi Arrese; Spain | Goran Ivanišević; Croatia |
| Men's singles | Marc Rosset; Switzerland | Jordi Arrese; Spain | Andrei Cherkasov; Unified Team (Russia) |
| Men's doubles | Germany; Boris Becker; Michael Stich | South Africa; Wayne Ferreira; Piet Norval | Croatia; Goran Ivanišević; Goran Prpić |
| Men's doubles | Germany; Boris Becker; Michael Stich | South Africa; Wayne Ferreira; Piet Norval | Argentina; Javier Frana; Christian Miniussi |
| Women's singles | Jennifer Capriati; United States | Steffi Graf; Germany | Mary Joe Fernández; United States |
| Women's singles | Jennifer Capriati; United States | Steffi Graf; Germany | Arantxa Sánchez Vicario; Spain |
| Women's doubles | United States; Gigi Fernández; Mary Joe Fernández | Spain; Conchita Martínez; Arantxa Sánchez Vicario | Unified Team; Leila Meskhi; Natasha Zvereva |
| Women's doubles | United States; Gigi Fernández; Mary Joe Fernández | Spain; Conchita Martínez; Arantxa Sánchez Vicario | Australia; Nicole Bradtke; Rachel McQuillan |

=== Medal table ===
| Rank | Nation | Gold | Silver | Bronze | Total |
|---|---|---|---|---|---|
| 1 | United States | 2 | 0 | 1 | 3 |
| 2 | Germany | 1 | 1 | 0 | 2 |
| 3 | Switzerland | 1 | 0 | 0 | 1 |
| 4 | Spain | 0 | 2 | 1 | 3 |
| 5 | South Africa | 0 | 1 | 0 | 1 |
| 6 | Croatia | 0 | 0 | 2 | 2 |
| 6 | Unified Team | 0 | 0 | 2 | 2 |
| 8 | Argentina | 0 | 0 | 1 | 1 |
| 8 | Australia | 0 | 0 | 1 | 1 |
| Totals (9 entries) | | 4 | 4 | 8 | 16 |

== Participating nations ==
- Argentina (6)
- Australia (7)
- Austria (5)
- Bahamas (2)
- Belgium (1)
- Brazil (4)
- Bulgaria (3)
- Canada (5)
- Chile (1)
- China (5)
- Croatia (2)
- Czechoslovakia (5)
- Denmark (2)
- France (7)
- Germany (6)
- Great Britain (6)
- Greece (4)
- Hungary (1)
- Independent Olympic Participants (1)
- India (2)
- Indonesia (5)
- Ireland (2)
- Israel (1)
- Italy (8)
- Japan (5)
- Latvia (2)
- Madagascar (2)
- Mexico (4)
- Morocco (2)
- Netherlands (5)
- Norway (2)
- Paraguay (2)
- Peru (2)
- Poland (3)
- Portugal (2)
- Puerto Rico (2)
- Romania (5)
- San Marino (2)
- Slovenia (4)
- South Africa (6)
- South Korea (4)
- Spain (6)
- Sweden (6)
- Switzerland (4)
- Thailand (2)
- Unified Team (5)
- United States (7)
- Zimbabwe (2)
