= Marco Polo Cycling–Donckers Koffie =

Cycling team

Marco Polo Cycling-Donckers Koffie
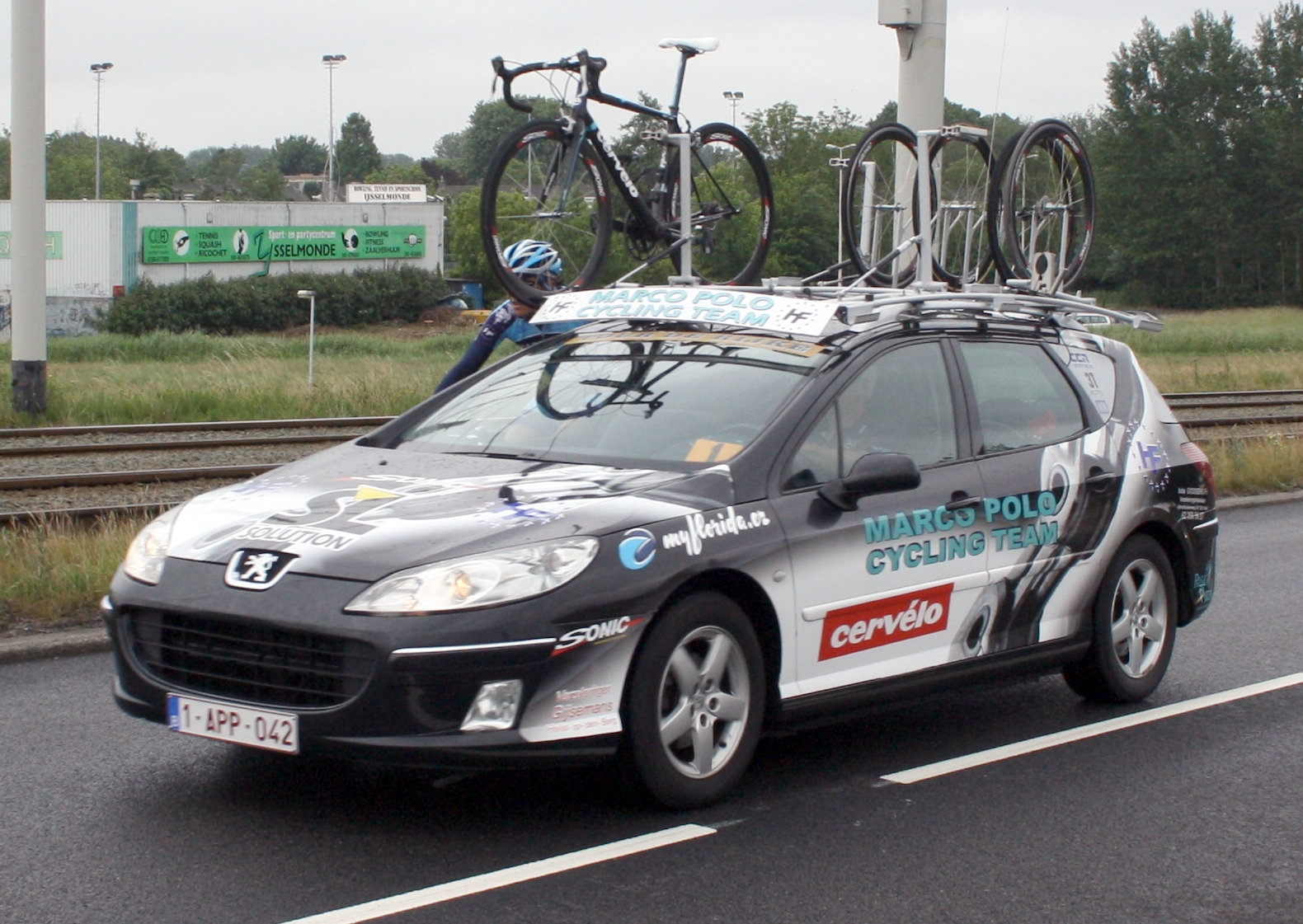

Team information
- UCI code: MPC
- Registered: Hong Kong: 2003–2004; China: 2005–2011; Ethiopia: 2012
- Founded: 2001
- Discipline: Road
- Status: Continental

Key personnel
- Team manager: Remko Kramer

Team name history
- 2003–2006 2007 2008–2009 2010–2011 2012: Marco Polo Cycling Team; Discovery Channel-Marco Polo Team; Trek-Marco Polo Cycling Team; Marco Polo Cycling Team; Marco Polo Cycling-Donckers Koffie

Marco Polo Cycling–Donckers Koffie (UCI Code: MPC) was a UCI Continental cycling team, registered in Ethiopia. The team is named after traveller Marco Polo, and has title sponsorship from Belgian coffee company Donckers Koffie.

== History ==
The idea of the team came in 1998 and in 2001 the team was registered in Hong Kong. In 2003 it became a UCI Continental team and from 2005 the team was registered in China becoming the first professional cycling team from China.

Li Fuyu rode with the team for two years from 2005 before joining the Discovery Channel team. This led to a partnership between the teams, resulting in the 2007 Discovery Channel Marco Polo team. In 2008, Trek became the sponsor and the name became Trek-Marco Polo. The team has a house in the Netherlands for riders.

After a ten-year run the team disbanded at the end of 2012, as they did not have a sponsor for 2013 season.

== Major wins ==
2003
Stage 1 & 5, Tour de Korea, Wong Kam-po
Mongolia, Road Race Championship, Jamsran Ulzii-Orshikh
Mongolia, Time Trial Championship, Jamsran Ulzii-Orshikh
Stage 1 Tour of Qinghai Lake, Wong Kam-po
Overall Tour du Faso, Maarten Tjallingii

Stage 1, Maarten Tjallingii
Stage 2 & 10, Kay Kermer

Stage 6a Tour of Southland, Robin Reid
2004
Stage 5 UAE Emirates Post Tour, Robin Reid
Overall Tour de Korea, Cory Lange
Stage 7 Tour of Southland, Robin Reid
2005
Stage 5 Tour of Siam, Edmunds Hollands
Mongolia, Road Race Championship, Jamsran Ulzii-Orshikh
Mongolia, Time Trial Championship, Jamsran Ulzii-Orshikh
New Zealand, Time Trial Championship, Robin Reid
2006
Overall Tour of Siam, Thomas Rabou

Stage 5, Jamsran Ulzii-Orshikh

Overall Tour of Thailand, Li Fuyu

Stage 3, Li Fuyu

Mongolia, Road Race Championship, Jamsran Ulzii-Orshikh
Mongolia, Time Trial Championship, Jamsran Ulzii-Orshikh
Stage 2 & 8 Tour d'Indonesia, Serguei Kudentsov
Stage 6 Tour d'Indonesia, Jamsran Ulzii-Orshikh
2007
Mongolia, Road Race Championship, Jamsran Ulzii-Orshikh
Stage 6 Tour de Korea, Serguei Kudentsov
Stage 1 & 4 Tour of Hainan, Serguei Kudentsov
2008
Stage 1 Jelajah Malaysia, Li Fuyu
Stage 3 Tour de Kumano, Léon van Bon
Stage 3 Tour of Thailand, Loh Sea Keong
Stage 6 Tour of Thailand, Léon van Bon
Stage 5 & 6 Tour of South China Sea, Serguei Kudentsov
2009
South Africa, Time Trial Championship, Jaco Venter
Stage 5 Tour of Thailand, James Spragg
Stage 8 Tour de Korea, Léon van Bon
(China) , Time Trial Championship, Li Fuyu

== National champions ==
2003
Mongolia, Road Race Championship, Jamsran Ulzii-Orshikh
Mongolia, Time Trial Championship, Jamsran Ulzii-Orshikh
2005
Mongolia, Road Race Championship, Jamsran Ulzii-Orshikh
Mongolia, Time Trial Championship, Jamsran Ulzii-Orshikh
New Zealand, Time Trial Championship, Robin Reid
2006
Mongolia, Road Race Championship, Jamsran Ulzii-Orshikh
Mongolia, Time Trial Championship, Jamsran Ulzii-Orshikh
2007
Mongolia, Road Race Championship, Jamsran Ulzii-Orshikh
2009
South Africa, Time Trial Championship, Jaco Venter
(China) , Time Trial Championship, Li Fuyu

== 2012 team ==
As of 23 February 2012.

Rider	Date of birth
Alem Abebe (ETH)	15 November 1990 (age 35)
Rubén Abello (ESP)	19 April 1976 (age 50)
Daniel Abraham (ERI)	11 February 1985 (age 41)
Shane Archbold (NZL)	2 February 1989 (age 37)
Chris Bartlett (GBR)	12 August 1986 (age 40)
Binyam Bekele (ETH)	18 September 1987 (age 38)
Solomon Bitew (ETH)	13 July 1987 (age 39)
Sven De Weerdt (BEL)	29 March 1978 (age 48)
Estifanos Gebresilassie (ETH)	18 February 1988 (age 38)
Matt Green (GBR)	2 October 1988 (age 37)

Rider	Date of birth
Edward Greene (RSA)	26 November 1990 (age 35)
Kbrom Hailay (ETH)	19 February 1989 (age 37)
Jan Kuyckx (BEL)	20 May 1979 (age 47)
Chris Macic (NZL)	1 August 1988 (age 38)
Matthé Pronk (NED)	1 July 1974 (age 52)
Marc Ryan (NZL)	14 October 1982 (age 43)
Léon van Bon (NED)	28 January 1972 (age 54)
Matthias Van Mechelen (BEL)	23 February 1988 (age 38)
Yirga Woldemariam (ETH)	19 February 1988 (age 38)
