= Tom Bohli =

Swiss cyclist

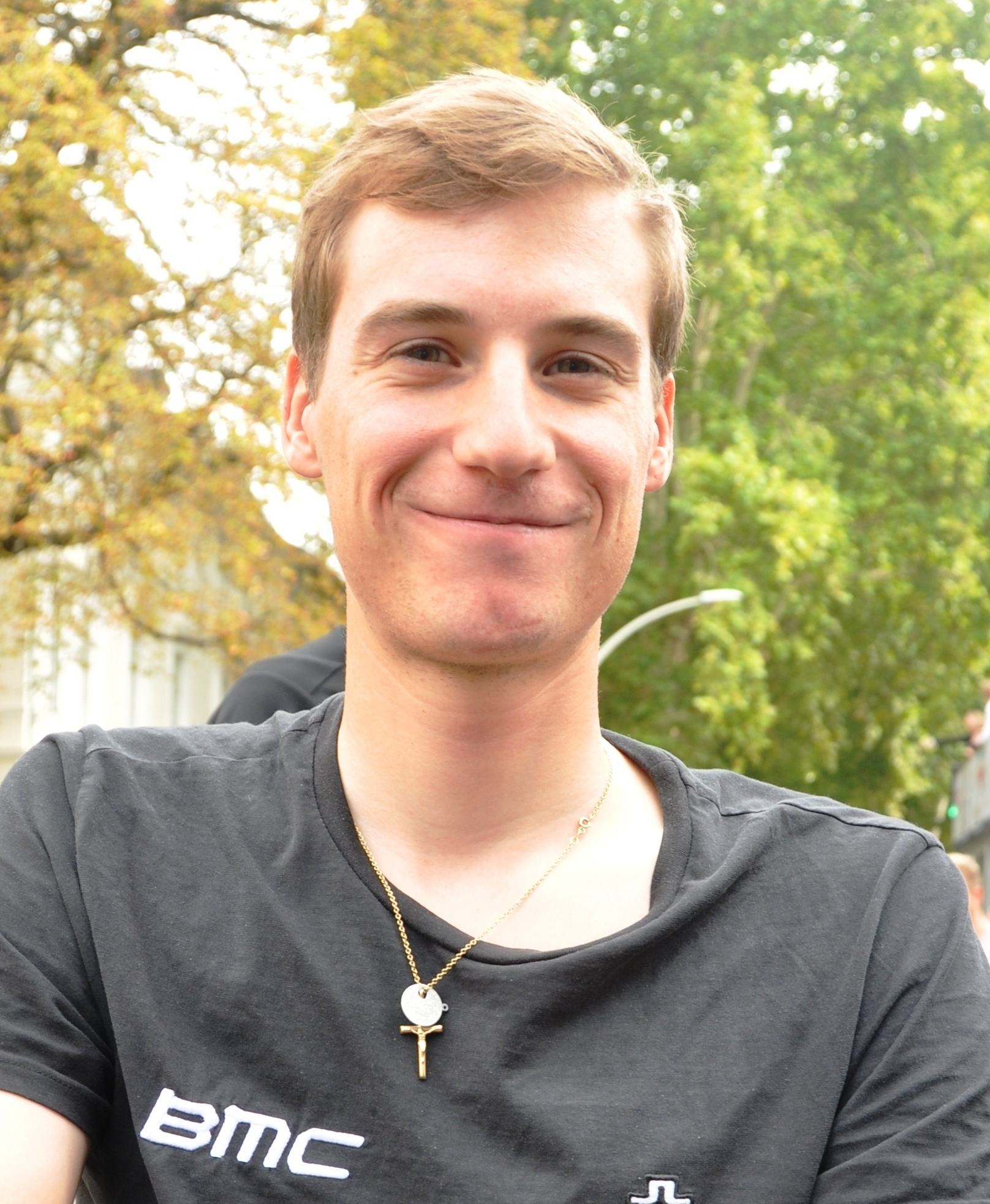
- Bohli in 2018

Personal information
- Full name: Tom Bohli
- Born: 17 January 1994 (age 32) Uznach, Switzerland
- Height: 1.83 m (6 ft 0 in)
- Weight: 71 kg (157 lb; 11.2 st)

Cycling career
- Sport: Cycling
- Current team: Retired
- Disciplines: Road; Track
- Role: Rider

Amateur team
- 2013–2015: BMC Development Team

Professional teams
- 2015: BMC Racing Team (stagiaire)
- 2016–2018: BMC Racing Team
- 2019–2020: UAE Team Emirates
- 2021–2022: Cofidis
- 2023–2024: Tudor Pro Cycling Team

Tom Bohli (born 17 January 1994) is a Swiss former racing cyclist, who competed as a professional from 2016 to 2024. He rode at the 2015 UCI Track Cycling World Championships. In May 2019, he was named in the startlist for the 2019 Giro d'Italia.

== Major results ==
=== Road ===
2011
1st Road race, National Junior Championships
2012
National Junior Championships

1st Road race
1st Time trial

8th Road race, UCI World Junior Championships
2013
5th Time trial, National Under-23 Championships
2014
2nd Time trial, National Under-23 Championships
5th Overall Tour de Normandie
UEC European Under-23 Championships

8th Time trial
9th Road race

10th Chrono Champenois
2015
1st Tour de Berne
2nd Time trial, National Under-23 Championships
6th Overall Tour de Normandie

1st Prologue

9th Overall Tour de l'Eurométropole
10th Overall ZLM Tour
2016
1st Stage 5 (TTT) Eneco Tour
8th Time trial, UCI World Under-23 Championships
8th Overall Driedaagse van West-Vlaanderen

1st Prologue

2017
1st Stage 1 (TTT) Volta a la Comunitat Valenciana
1st Young rider classification, Tour du Haut Var
4th Time trial, National Championships
2018
3rd Time trial, National Championships
2019
5th Overall Okolo Slovenska
2020
5th Time trial, National Championships
2022
3rd Time trial, National Championships
7th Rund um Köln

=== Grand Tour general classification results timeline ===
Grand Tour	2019
Giro d'Italia	139
Tour de France	—
Vuelta a España	—

=== Track ===
2012
1st Individual pursuit, UCI World Junior Championships
UEC European Junior Championships

1st Individual pursuit
2nd Points

2013
1st Team pursuit, UEC European Under-23 Championships
2014
UEC European Under-23 Championships

1st Team pursuit
3rd Individual pursuit

1st Individual pursuit, National Championships
2015
UEC European Under-23 Championships

2nd Individual pursuit
2nd Team pursuit
