= Radiša Čubrić =

Serbian cyclist (born 1962)

Personal information
- Born: 24 July 1962 (age 64) Kraljevo, Yugoslavia

Cycling career
- Sport: Cycling

Radiša Čubrić (born 24 July 1962) is a Serbian former cyclist. He competed in the individual road race at the 1992 Summer Olympics.
