= Igor Patenko =

Russian cyclist

Personal information
- Born: 25 May 1969 (age 57) Taraz, Kazakh SSR, Soviet Union

Cycling career
- Sport: Cycling

Igor Patenko (born 25 May 1969) is a Soviet former cyclist. He competed in the team time trial at the 1992 Summer Olympics for the Unified Team.
