= Flavio Anastasia =

Italian cyclist (born 1969)

Personal information
- Born: 30 January 1969 (age 57) Mariano Comense, Italy

Cycling career
- Sport: Cycling
Medal record
Men's cycling
Representing Italy
Olympic Games
Silver medal – second place	1992 Barcelona	Team Time Trial

Flavio Anastasia (born 30 January 1969) is an Italian cyclist. He was born in Mariano Comense (Lombardia), Italy. In 1993, he was in the team Amore & Vita – Galatron.

He won the silver medal in the Team Time Trial at the 1992 Summer Olympics
