= Hervé Boussard =

French cyclist (1966–2013)

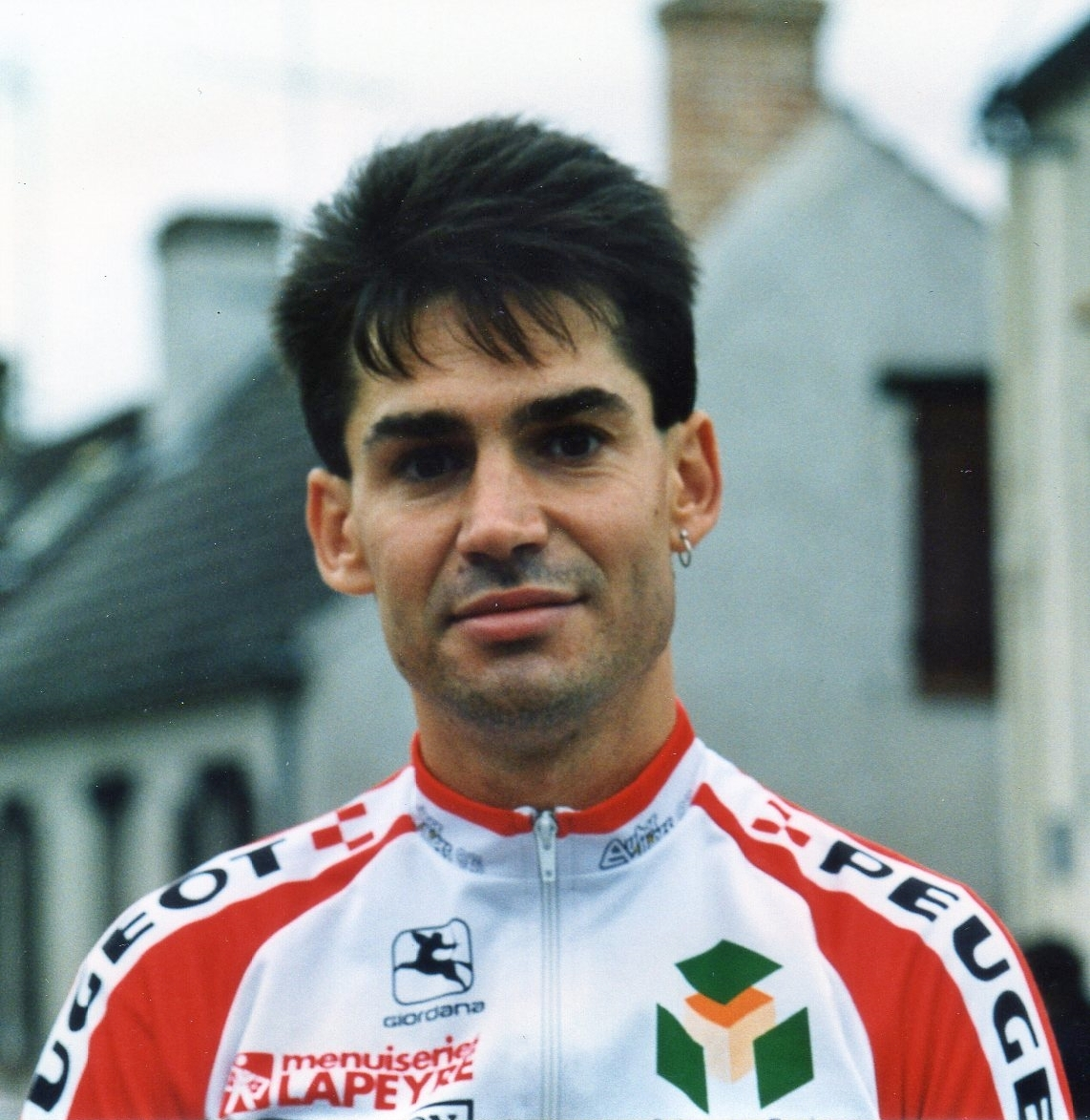
- Boussard in 1994

Personal information
- Born: 8 March 1966 Pithiviers, France
- Died: 26 June 2013 (aged 47) Lésigny, France

Cycling career
- Sport: Cycling
Medal record
Men's cycling
Representing France
Olympic Games
Bronze medal – third place	1992 Barcelona	Team Time Trial

Hervé Boussard (8 March 1966 – 26 June 2013) was a French cyclist. He won a bronze medal in team time trial in the 1992 Summer Olympics. He died in 2013 from an epileptic seizure.

== See also ==
- List of people with epilepsy
