= Chesen Frey =

American cyclist

Personal information
- Born: October 28, 1973 (age 52)

Cycling career
- Sport: Cycling

Chesen Frey (born October 28, 1973) is an American cyclist from the United States Virgin Islands. He competed in the individual road race at the 1992 Summer Olympics. In 2003, he was banned by the United States Anti-Doping Agency for two years, after testing positive for high levels of testosterone.
