= Tennis at the 1992 Summer Olympics – Women's doubles =

Women's doubles
- Tennis at the 1992 Summer Olympics

Final
- Champions: Gigi Fernández (United States) Mary Joe Fernández (USA)
- Runners-up: Conchita Martínez (Spain) Arantxa Sánchez Vicario (ESP)
- Score: 7–5, 2–6, 6–2

Events
Singles	men	women
Doubles	men	women
← 1988 ·	Summer Olympics	· 1996 →

The United States' Gigi Fernández and Mary Joe Fernández defeated Spain's Conchita Martínez and Arantxa Sánchez Vicario in the final, 7–5, 2–6, 6–2 to win the gold medal in Women's Doubles tennis at the 1992 Summer Olympics. The Unified Team's Leila Meskhi and Natasha Zvereva and Australia's Rachel McQuillan and Nicole Provis won the bronze medals.

The tournament was held at the Vall d'Hebron complex on Montjuïc in Barcelona, Spain from 30 July to 7 August 1992.

The United States' Zina Garrison and Pam Shriver were the reigning gold medalists, but neither competed in this tournament.

== Medalists ==
Gold	Gigi Fernández / Mary Joe Fernández; United States
Silver	Conchita Martínez / Arantxa Sánchez Vicario; Spain
Bronze	Leila Meskhi / Natasha Zvereva; Unified Team
Bronze	Rachel McQuillan / Nicole Provis; Australia

== Seeds ==
1. Conchita Martínez / Arantxa Sánchez Vicario (ESP) (final, silver medalists)
2. Gigi Fernández / Mary Joe Fernández (USA) (champions, Gold medalists)
3. Jana Novotná / Andrea Strnadová (TCH) (quarterfinals)
4. Leila Meskhi / Natasha Zvereva (EUN) (semifinals, bronze medalists)
5. Rachel McQuillan / Nicole Provis (AUS) (semifinals, bronze medalists)
6. Mariaan de Swardt / Elna Reinach (RSA) (quarterfinals)
7. Mercedes Paz / Patricia Tarabini (ARG) (quarterfinals)
8. Isabelle Demongeot / Nathalie Tauziat (FRA) (quarterfinals)

== Draw ==
Key

- Q = Qualifier
- WC = Wild card
- LL = Lucky loser
- Alt = Alternate
- ITF = ITF entry
- PR = Protected ranking
- SR = Special ranking
- SE = Special exempt
- JE = Junior exempt
- JR = Junior Accelerator Programme entrant
- CO = College Accelerator Programme entrant
- NG = Next Gen Accelerator Program entrant
- w/o = Walkover
- r = Retired
- d = Defaulted

=== Finals ===
Semifinals
1	Conchita Martínez (ESP); Arantxa Sánchez Vicario (ESP)	6	6
5	Rachel McQuillan (AUS); Nicole Provis (AUS)	1	2
4	Leila Meskhi (EUN); Natasha Zvereva (EUN)	4	5
2	Gigi Fernández (USA); Mary Joe Fernández (USA)	6	7

Final (gold-medal match)
1	Conchita Martínez (ESP); Arantxa Sánchez Vicario (ESP)	5	6	2
2	Gigi Fernández (USA); Mary Joe Fernández (USA)	7	2	6

=== Top half ===
First round
1	C Martínez (ESP); A Sánchez Vicario (ESP)	6	6
LL	D Randriantefy (MAD); N Randriantefy (MAD)	0	0
LL	T Križan (SLO); K Lušnic (SLO)	2	2
M Maleeva-Fragniere (SUI); E Zardo (SUI)	6	6
Q	S Duangchan (THA); B Sangaram (THA)	4	4
Alt	P Hy (CAN); R Simpson-Alter (CAN)	6	6
Q	R de los Ríos (PAR); L Schaerer (PAR)	1	6^{3}
8	I Demongeot (FRA); N Tauziat (FRA)	6	7^{7}
3	J Novotná (TCH); A Strnadová (TCH)	6	6
Q	R Dragomir (ROM); I Spîrlea (ROM)	1	4
K Date (JPN); M Kidowaki (JPN)	5
Q	I-s Kim (KOR); J-m Lee (KOR)	2^{r}
C Chabalgoity (BRA); A Vieira (BRA)	6	7^{7}
C Lindqvist (SWE); M Lindström (SWE)	2	6^{5}
Q	A Gavaldón (MEX); L Novelo (MEX)	7	3	1
5	R McQuillan (AUS); N Provis (AUS)	5	6	6

Second round
1	C Martínez (ESP); A Sánchez Vicario (ESP)	6	6
M Maleeva-Fragniere (SUI); E Zardo (SUI)	0	1
Alt	P Hy (CAN); R Simpson-Alter (CAN)	6	3	2
8	I Demongeot (FRA); N Tauziat (FRA)	3	6	6
3	J Novotná (TCH); A Strnadová (TCH)	6	7^{7}
K Date (JPN); M Kidowaki (JPN)	3	6^{4}
C Chabalgoity (BRA); A Vieira (BRA)	2	1
5	R McQuillan (AUS); N Provis (AUS)	6	6

Quarterfinals
1	C Martínez (ESP); A Sánchez Vicario (ESP)	6	6
8	I Demongeot (FRA); N Tauziat (FRA)	2	4
3	J Novotná (TCH); A Strnadová (TCH)	3	3
5	R McQuillan (AUS); N Provis (AUS)	6	6

Semifinals
1	C Martínez (ESP); A Sánchez Vicario (ESP)	6	6
5	R McQuillan (AUS); N Provis (AUS)	1	2

=== Bottom half ===
First round
7	M Paz (ARG); P Tarabini (ARG)	6	4	6
Q	M Mroz (POL); K Teodorowicz (POL)	4	6	3
F Li (CHN); M Tang (CHN)	7^{7}	6
Q	C Papadáki (GRE); C Zachariadou (GRE)	6^{5}	3
A Blumberga (LAT); L Savchenko (LAT)	4	7	3
P Ritter (AUT); J Wiesner (AUT)	6	5	6
K Maleeva (BUL); M Maleeva (BUL)
4	L Meskhi (EUN); N Zvereva (EUN)	w/o
6	M de Swardt (RSA); E Reinach (RSA)	6	6
Q	S A McDonald (ZIM); J Muir (ZIM)	0	3
L Garrone (ITA); R Reggi-Concato (ITA)	5	6	6
Alt	S Smith (GBR); C Wood (GBR)	7	1	3
S Graf (GER); A Huber (GER)	6	6
S Anggarkusuma (INA); Y Basuki (INA)	2	3
Alt	N Muns-Jagerman (NED); B Schultz (NED)	0	0
2	G Fernández (USA); M J Fernández (USA)	6	6

Second round
7	M Paz (ARG); P Tarabini (ARG)	6	6
Q	F Li (CHN); M Tang (CHN)	0	1
P Ritter (AUT); J Wiesner (AUT)	1	1
4	L Meskhi (EUN); N Zvereva (EUN)	6	6
6	M de Swardt (RSA); E Reinach (RSA)	6	6
L Garrone (ITA); R Reggi-Concato (ITA)	3	2
S Graf (GER); A Huber (GER)	6^{3}	4
2	G Fernández (USA); M J Fernández (USA)	7^{7}	6

Quarterfinals
7	M Paz (ARG); P Tarabini (ARG)	2	3
4	L Meskhi (EUN); N Zvereva (EUN)	6	6
6	M de Swardt (RSA); E Reinach (RSA)	2	4
2	G Fernández (USA); M J Fernández (USA)	6	6

Semifinals
4	L Meskhi (EUN); N Zvereva (EUN)	4	5
2	G Fernández (USA); M J Fernández (USA)	6	7
