= Nathan Sheafor =

American cyclist

Personal information
- Born: November 16, 1961 (age 64) Fort Bragg, North Carolina, U.S.

Cycling career
- Sport: Cycling

Nathan Sheafor (born November 16, 1961) is an American former cyclist. Sheafor won the 1989 United States National Time Trial Championships. He also competed in the team time trial at the 1992 Summer Olympics.
