= Kozo Fujita =

Japanese cyclist (born 1967)

Personal information
- Born: 21 November 1967 (age 58) Iwate, Japan

Cycling career
- Sport: Cycling

Professional team
- Bridgestone Racing

Kozo Fujita (藤田 晃三, Fujita Kōzō; born 21 November 1967) is a Japanese former cyclist. He competed in the individual road race at the 1992 Summer Olympics. As a professional, he rode for Bridgestone Racing, the precursor of Bridgestone–Anchor, until he retired in 2000. He then became an employee of Bridgestone Cycle.
