= Claudia Peczinka =

Swiss synchronized swimmer

Personal information
- Nationality: Switzerland
- Born: 21 January 1968 (age 58)
- Height: 5 ft 6 in (168 cm)
- Weight: 53 kg (117 lb)

Sport
- Sport: Swimming
- Strokes: Synchronized swimming
- Club: SV Limmat
- Updated on 21 May 2015

Claudia Peczinka (born 21 January 1968) is a former synchronized swimmer from Switzerland. She competed in the women's solo at both the 1988 and 1992 Summer Olympics.
