= Zundui Naran =

Mongolian cyclist (born 1967)

Personal information
- Born: 13 February 1967 (age 59)

Cycling career
- Sport: Cycling

Zundui Naran (Mongolian: Зундуйн Наран, romanized: Zunduin Naran; born 13 February 1967) is a Mongolian former cyclist. He competed in the team time trial at the 1992 Summer Olympics. Naran was born to a Mongolian father and a Lithuanian mother. In 2010 he co-founded the Snow Leopard Club, an organisation for Mongolian cyclo-cross and off-road cyclists. As of 2018, he was the president of the Mongolian Cycling Association. He also runs the bicycle store Attila in Ulaanbaatar.
