= Igor Dzyuba =

Soviet cyclist

Personal information
- Born: 13 April 1972 (age 54) Tashkent, Soviet Union

Cycling career
- Sport: Cycling

Igor Dzyuba (born 13 April 1972) is a Soviet former cyclist. He competed in the team time trial at the 1992 Summer Olympics for the Unified Team.
