= Thomas Boutellier =

Swiss cyclist

Personal information
- Born: 2 April 1967 (age 59)

Cycling career
- Sport: Cycling

Thomas Boutellier (born 2 April 1967) is a Swiss former cyclist. He competed in the team time trial at the 1992 Summer Olympics.
