= Colin Davidson (Australian Army officer) =

Australian Army officer (??–1979)

Colin Bancroft Davidson (died 11 September 1979) was a land surveyor and captain in the Australian Military Forces during World War II who was awarded the US Medal of Freedom in 1948.

== Early life ==
Davidson originally went to Papua (now known as Papua-New Guinea) in 1929 to manage a coffee plantation, which was underwritten by a group of businessmen in Cairns, Australia. However, due to financial issues, caused by the Great Depression, the plantation was abandoned. As he was already in Papua, he applied for and was employed as a surveyor for the Papuan government, where he went on to survey the south-eastern Papuan coast and up the Kokoda track to the Owen Stanley Range, up until 1941 when the Imperial Japanese Army invaded.

== World War II ==
Davidson was surveying near Gona, Papua when the Imperial Japanese Forces came ashore at Gona, upon hearing of the landing he personally supervised the evacuation of 58 women and children from the villages along the Kokoda track as the Japanese forces advanced, although the advancing forces were less than 8 hours behind them, he successfully reached Port Moresby with all the evacuees in tow.

He held the rank of captain in the Australian Military Forces during World War II and as a result of his services to the allied forces (US) he was awarded the US Medal of Freedom by President Truman in 1948, the honour was gazetted in the Australian Commonwealth Government Gazette on 15 April 1948. As the medal was not a Commonwealth honour it was firstly approved by King George VI and subsequently presented to him by the then "Administrator of Papua" in Port Moresby.

The US Medal of Freedom was conferred on him as recognition of the services given during the Pacific conflict, he was assigned directly to General MacArthur to supply intelligence information regarding Papuan topography and conditions. As he had been a plantation manager and employed by the Papuan government as a Surveyor, Colin was based in and around Port Moresby during the late 1920s and most of the 30s, he worked to survey from the coast to the Owen Stanley Range, so his intimate knowledge of the terrain, particularly Gona / Buna and along the Kokoda track, was invaluable. He then went with McArthur, as part of the advanced echelon, to assist him in the Philippines. General MacArthur was personally responsible for commending him as a medal recipient.

CITATION FOR MEDAL OF FREEDOM

Captain COLIN B. DAVIDSON, PX227, Australian Intelligence Corps, Australian Imperial Forces.

For meritorious service which has aided the United States in the prosecution of the war against Japan in the Southwest Pacific Area, from 18 November 1942 to 31 October 1945. Assigned to duty with the Allied Geographical Section, General Headquarters, Southwest Pacific Area, which later became United States Army Forces, Pacific, Captain Davidson displayed outstanding professional skill in coping with unprecedented problems incident to the formulation and execution of policies and standing operating procedures for intelligence activities throughout the theater. Devoting the most painstaking application and resourcefulness to the accomplishment of his vital tasks, he was instrumental in effecting the early and extensive distribution of Terrain Handbooks which proved highly effective in orienting all forces for major operations against the enemy. Similarly, he compiled voluminous intelligence information reports and lent invaluable assistance to strategic and tactical planning agencies. Working long, arduous hours and evidencing at all times the highest devotion to duty, Captain Davidson, through his skillful accomplishment of a difficult mission, contributed in great measure to the success of military operations in the Southwest pacific Area.

Address; Mitchelton, Brisbane, Queensland, Australia.

== Later life ==
After the war Davidson remained in the Australian Government's service until his retirement in the 1960s. He died on 11 September 1979.

In 2005 a book entitled "A Basis for Victory - The Allied Geographical Section 1942-1946" written by Reuben R.E Bowd, was published. This book explores the work of the Allied Geographical Section and its part in contributing to the allied victory in the Pacific. References to Davidson and his appearance in several of the photographic illustrations can be found in this book.

Davidson's brother was Sir Charles William Davidson who was a distinguished Australian Army officer, who served in both World War I and World War II and went on to become a Federal Minister in the Australian Government during the 1950s and 60s.
