= Caroline Imoberdorf =

Swiss synchronized swimmer

Personal information
- Nationality: Switzerland
- Born: 12 January 1972 (age 54)
- Height: 5 ft 9 in (175 cm)
- Weight: 63 kg (139 lb)

Sport
- Sport: Swimming
- Strokes: Synchronized swimming
- Club: SV Limmat
- Updated on 21 May 2015

Caroline Imoberdorf (born 12 January 1972) is a former synchronized swimmer from Switzerland. She competed in both the women's solo and the women's duet competitions at the 1992 Summer Olympics.
