= Lars Kristian Johnsen =

Norwegian cyclist

Personal information
- Born: 28 August 1970 (age 56) Eidsvoll, Norway

Cycling career
- Sport: Cycling

Lars Kristian Johnsen (born 28 August 1970) is a Norwegian former cyclist. He competed in the individual road race at the 1992 Summer Olympics.
