= Sergio Tesitore =

Uruguayan cyclist

Personal information
- Born: 10 February 1967 (age 59) Canelones, Uruguay

Cycling career
- Sport: Cycling

Sergio Tesitore (born 10 February 1967) is a Uruguayan former cyclist. He competed in the individual road race at the 1992 Summer Olympics.
