= Igor Dziuba =

Ukrainian speed skater (born 1983)

Ihor Dziuba (born 1983) is a Ukrainian long track speed skater who participates in international competitions.

== Personal records ==
Personal records
Men's Speed skating
Event	Result	Date	Location	Notes
500 m	39.76	2006-11-18	Erfurt	
1,000 m	1:16.84	2007-01-20	Turin	
1,500 m	1:56.62	2008-01-13	Kolomna	
3,000 m	4:49.50	2002-05-02		
5,000 m	6:48.17	2007-12-08	Heerenveen	
10,000 m	17:22.50	2004-01-23	Kyiv	

=== Career highlights ===
European Allround Championships
2008 - Kolomna, 30th
National Championships
2004 - Kyiv, (bronze) 3rd at 5000 m
2004 - Kyiv, (bronze) 3rd at 1500 m
2004 - Kyiv, (bronze) 3rd at 1000 m
2004 - Kyiv, (bronze) 3rd at 10000 m
