= Sylvain Bolay =

French cyclist

Personal information
- Born: 31 October 1963 (age 62) Lausanne, Switzerland

Cycling career
- Sport: Cycling

Sylvain Bolay (born 31 October 1963) is a French former cyclist. He competed in the individual road race at the 1992 Summer Olympics.
