= Christian Meyer (cyclist) =

German track cyclist

Personal information
- Full name: Christian Meyer
- Born: 12 December 1969 (age 56) Freiburg, West Germany

Cycling career
- Sport: Cycling
- Disciplines: Road and Track
- Role: Rider
Medal record
Men's road bicycle racing
Representing Germany
Olympic Games
Gold medal – first place	1992 Barcelona	Team Time Trial

Christian Meyer (born 12 December 1969) is a retired German track cyclist who won the gold medal for his native country in the men's team time trial (100 km) at the 1992 Summer Olympics in Barcelona. His winning teammates were Michael Rich, Bernd Dittert and Uwe Peschel.
