= Colin Davidson (cyclist) =

Canadian cyclist (born 1969)

Personal information
- Born: 21 July 1969 (age 57) Vancouver, British Columbia, Canada

Cycling career
- Sport: Cycling

Colin Davidson (born 21 July 1969) is a Canadian former cyclist. He competed in the team time trial at the 1992 Summer Olympics.
