= Tom Bamford (cyclist) =

New Zealand cyclist (born 1963)

Personal information
- Born: 22 May 1963 (age 63) Masterton, Wellington, New Zealand

Cycling career
- Sport: Cycling

Tom Bamford (born 22 May 1963) is a New Zealand cyclist. He competed in the individual road race at the 1992 Summer Olympics.
