= Stephen Farrell (cyclist) =

British cyclist

Personal information
- Born: 18 June 1965 (age 61) Stoke-on-Trent, Staffordshire, England

Cycling career
- Sport: Cycling

Stephen Farrell (born 18 June 1965) is a British former cyclist. He competed in the team time trial at the 1992 Summer Olympics.
