= Raido Kodanipork =

Estonian cyclist

Personal information
- Born: 8 May 1969 (age 57) Tallinn, then part of Estonian SSR, Soviet Union

Cycling career
- Sport: Cycling

Raido Kodanipork (born 8 May 1969) is an Estonian former cyclist. He competed at the 1992 Summer Olympics and the 1996 Summer Olympics.
