= Miguel Fernández (cyclist) =

Spanish cyclist (born 1969)

Personal information
- Born: 17 February 1969 (age 57) Bullas, Spain

Cycling career
- Sport: Cycling

Miguel Fernández (born 17 February 1969) is a Spanish former cyclist. He competed in the team time trial at the 1992 Summer Olympics.
