= Maria Dziuba =

Polish politician (born 1945)

- Born: 2 January 1945 (age 81); Goszczyn, Masovian Voivodeship, Poland
- Occupation: Politician
- Political party: Polish People's Party

Maria Jadwiga Dziuba (born 2 January 1945) is a Polish farmer and politician from the Polish People's Party. She served as member of the Sejm from 2004 to 2005.
