= Beat Meister =

Swiss cyclist

Personal information
- Born: 22 September 1965 (age 61) Zürich, Switzerland

Cycling career
- Sport: Cycling

Beat Meister (born 22 September 1965) is a Swiss former cyclist. He competed in the team time trial at the 1992 Summer Olympics.
