= Tennis de la Vall d'Hebron =

Spanish sporting venue in Barcelona

Coordinates: 41°25′47″N 2°8′47″E

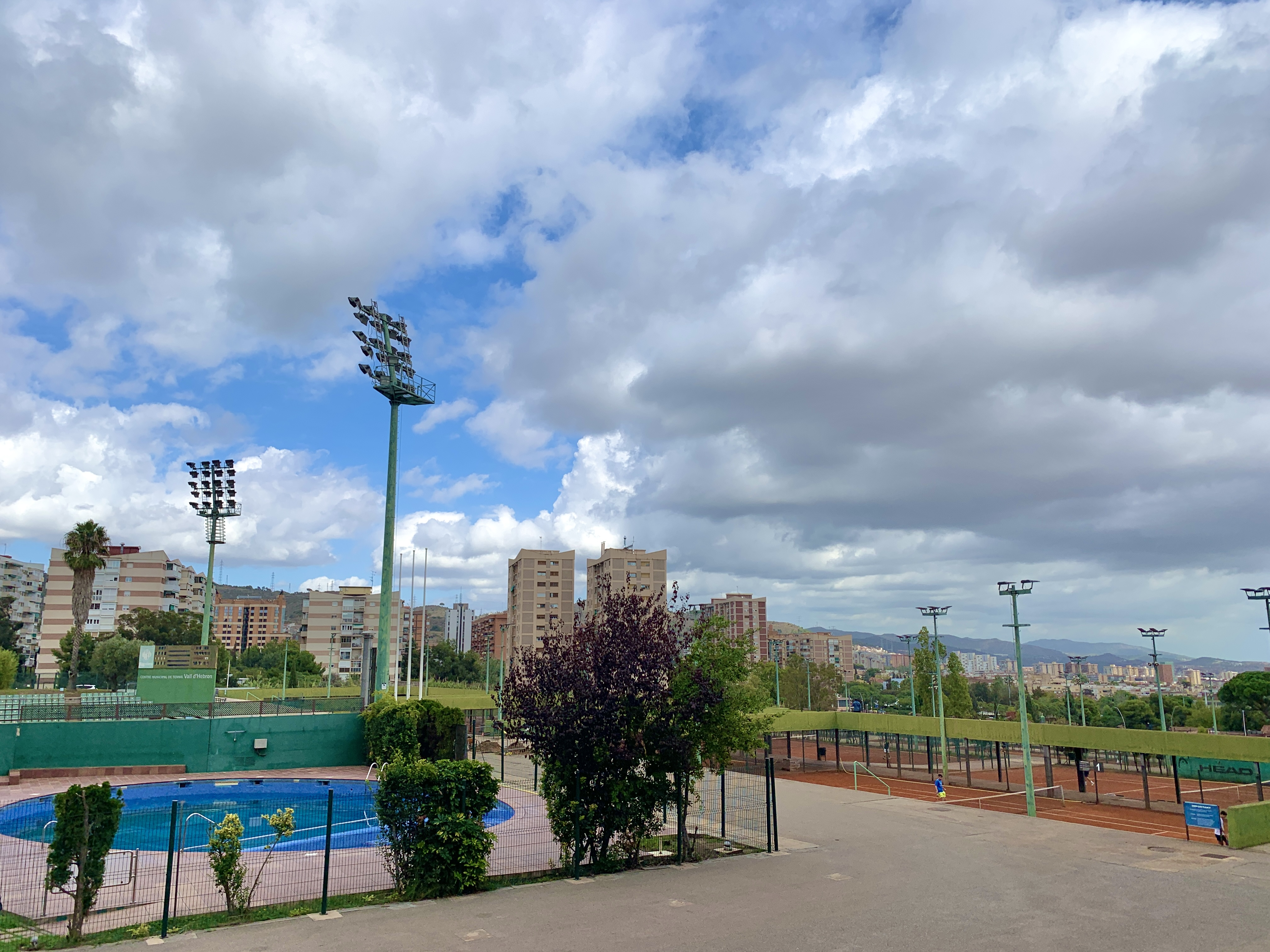
Tennis de la Vall d’Hebron

The Tennis de la Vall d'Hebron (English: Vall d'Hebron Tennis) is a sports venue located in the Horta-Guinardó district of Barcelona. Modified in 1991, it used only nine of the 17 courts for the tennis competitions of the 1992 Summer Olympics.
