= Urs Güller =

Swiss cyclist

Personal information
- Born: 21 November 1967 (age 58) Schwaderloch, Aargau, Switzerland
- Height: 1.79 m (5 ft 10 in)
- Weight: 72 kg (159 lb)

Cycling career
- Sport: Cycling

Urs Güller (born 21 November 1967) is a Swiss former cyclist. He competed in the individual road race at the 1992 Summer Olympics. Güller was born in Schwaderloch, Aargau canton, Switzerland and weighs 72 kg and is 1.79 m tall.
