= Theodor Rinderknecht =

Swiss cyclist

Personal information
- Born: 6 January 1958 (age 68)

Cycling career
- Sport: Cycling

Theodor Rinderknecht (born 6 January 1958) is a Swiss former cyclist. He competed in the team time trial at the 1992 Summer Olympics.
