= Viktor Kunz =

Swiss cyclist

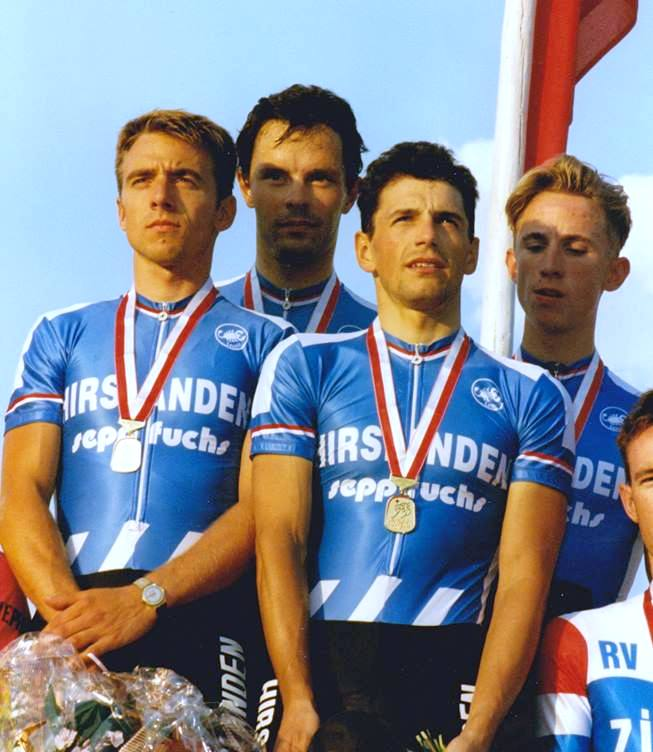
- Velo Mountain club Hirslanden-Zürich 1996

Personal information
- Born: 21 March 1968 (age 58)

Cycling career
- Sport: Cycling

Viktor Kunz (born 21 March 1968) is a Swiss former cyclist. He competed in the individual pursuit at the 1992 Summer Olympics.
