= Jamal Ahmed Al-Doseri =

Bahraini cyclist

Personal information
- Born: 1 January 1970 (age 56)

Cycling career
- Sport: Cycling

Jamal Ahmed Al-Doseri (born 1 January 1970) is a Bahraini former cyclist. He competed in two events at the 1992 Summer Olympics.
