= Saber Mohamed Hasan =

Bahraini former cyclist

Personal information
- Born: 9 July 1967 (age 59)

Cycling career
- Sport: Cycling

Saber Mohamed Hasan (born 9 July 1967) is a Bahraini former cyclist. He competed in two events at the 1992 Summer Olympics.
