= Jamsrangiin Ölzii-Orshikh =

Mongolian cyclist (1967–2019)

Personal information
- Full name: Jamsrangiin Ölzii-Orshikh
- Born: 14 June 1967 Tarialan, Khövsgöl, Mongolia
- Died: 4 April 2019 (aged 51)
- Height: 161 cm (5 ft 3 in)

Cycling career
- Sport: Cycling
- Discipline: Road
- Role: Rider

Professional teams
- 2002-2003: Giant Asia Racing Team
- 2003-2007: Marco Polo Cycling Team
Medal record
Men's road bicycle racing
Representing Mongolia
Asian Championships
Silver medal – second place	2001 Kaohsiung Taichung	Team time trial

Jamsrangiin Ölzii-Orshikh (born 14 June 1967 – April 29, 2019; Mongolian: Жамсрангийн Өлзий-Орших) was a Mongolian cyclist. He competed in two events at the 1992 Summer Olympics.

== Palmares ==
2001
Mongolian road champion
Mongolian time trial champion
2002
1st stage Tour of Bulgaria
Perlis Open
2003
Mongolian road champion
Mongolian time trial champion
2005
Mongolian road champion
Mongolian time trial champion
3rd Tour of Siam
2006
Mongolian road champion
Mongolian time trial champion
5th stage Tour of Siam
6th stage Tour d'Indonesia
2007
Mongolian road champion
2009
3rd Mongolian road championship
