= Dashjamtsyn Mönkhbat =

Mongolian cyclist (born 1961)

Personal information
- Born: 27 December 1961 (age 64)

Cycling career
- Sport: Cycling

Dashjamtsyn Mönkhbat (born 27 December 1961) is a Mongolian former cyclist. He competed in two events at the 1992 Summer Olympics.
