= Jameel Kadhem =

Bahraini cyclist

Personal information
- Born: 25 May 1971 (age 55)

Cycling career
- Sport: Cycling

Jameel Kadhem (born 25 May 1971) is a Bahraini former cyclist. He competed in two events at the 1992 Summer Olympics.
